= Franco Scalamandré =

- Born: April 15, 1898; Naples, Italy
- Died: March 4, 1988 (aged 89); Plandome Manor, New York, US
- Education: Royal Polytechnic School of Naples
- Known for: Textile design and co-founder of Scalamandré Silks (later Scalamandré Inc.)
- Spouse: Flora Baranzelli (m. 1929; died 1987)
- Awards: Colonial Dames Award for Americanism; Gordon Gray Award for Achievement in Preservation – National Trust for Historic Preservation; Thomas Jefferson Award – American Society of Interior Designers

Franco Scalamandré (April 15, 1898 – March 4, 1988) was an Italian-born American co-founder of Scalamandré Inc., a US manufacturer of traditional textiles, decorative textile trims, wall covering, and carpeting.

He was the son of Giuseppe Scalamandré and Maria Teresa Ambrosina Scalamandré. His father was a broker of silk, and a textile importer in Calabria.

== Education, immigration and founding Scalamandré Silks ==
1923 Scalamandré completed a doctorate in engineering from the Royal Polytechnic School of Naples, and in 1924 immigrated to the United States. In 1925 he worked as a draftsman for the Westinghouse Electric Company in Newark, New Jersey. In 1926 he began teaching drawing at the E. A. Seeley School of Decoration in Paterson, New Jersey. In 1929 Scalamandré married Flora Baranzelli a designer and painter. The same year they formed Scalamandré Silks. The Founding of the company coincided with a growing movement in the United States of restoring historic houses and furnishings. Scalamandré began recreating historic fabrics based on the collections of historic homes and museums.

== Scalamandré Museum of Textiles ==
In 1936 Scalamandré opened the Scalamandré Museum of Textiles, located in the company's Manhattan showroom. The museum displayed the company's collection of historic European and American textiles. The museum continued in operation, with a mission of showing historic textile documents to the public, often alongside the company's careful reproductions, until the late 1960s.

== Recreating historic textiles ==
Scalamandré and his company reproduced historic textile documents for prestigious homes and museums including the White House, the United States Capitol, many state houses, governors' mansions, the Metropolitan Museum of Art, and Hearst Castle in San Simeon, California. A 1989 exhibition at the Paley Design Center of the Philadelphia College of Textiles and Science titled "Scalamandre: Preserving America's Textile Heritage, 1929-1989" credited Franco Scalamandré and his firm with having recreated over 600 historic textile reproductions.

== Work at the White House ==
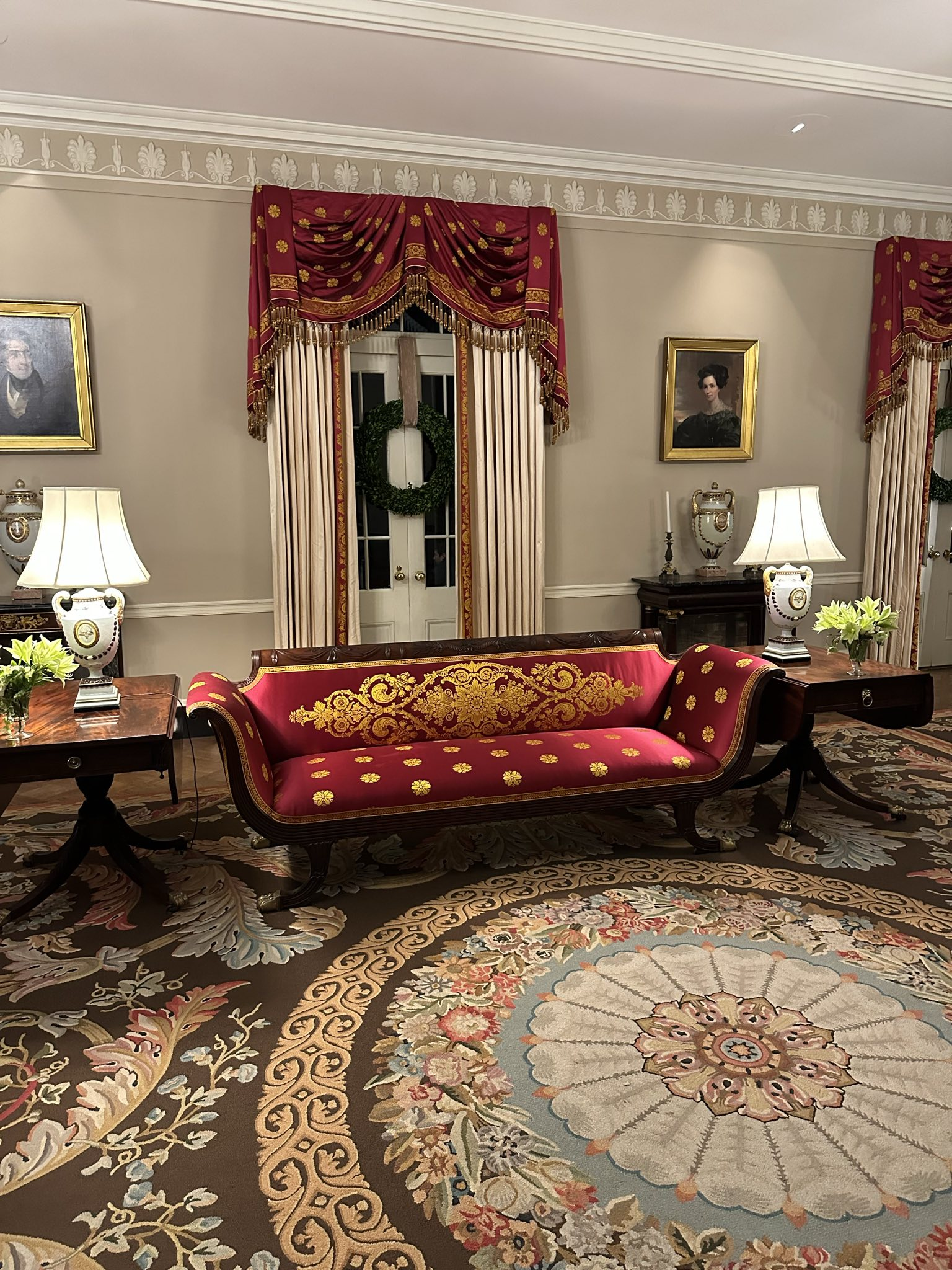
Scalamandré historical reproduction of curtains in the Georgia Governor's Mansion

Scalamandré was commissioned to produce silk fabric for the White House restoration during the administration of president John F. Kennedy. In 1961 the firm was contacted to provide material for the White House. American interior decorator Sister Parish performing initial redecoration work primarily on the residential floor of the White House specified several stock fabrics from Scalamandré Silks. As the White House restoration began to focus on the more public ceremonial rooms of the State Floor, French interior designer Stéphane Boudin of Maison Jansen was given oversight of the redecoration of the Red Room, Blue Room, East Room, and the fabric selection for the Green Room. Boudin was encouraged to use the American manufacture Scalamandré to recreate several of the historic fabric documents from the library of Maison Jansen, and the recreation of a complex silk lampas with an eagle design for the upholstery of a suite of French Empire furniture by cabinetmaker Pierre-Antoine Bellangé originally acquired by James Madison for the Blue Room. This, and the Green Room's complex hand woven watered silk moiré proved most challenging. Samples for the Blue Room's upholstery disappointed First Lady Jacqueline Kennedy and Stéphane Boudin. White House Chief Usher J. B. West recorded that the Curator of the White House William Voss Elder, III described the sample as looking like a plucked chicken. Samples for the Green Room watered silk wall covering were found to be coarse, too thick, and too regular in comparison with the 18th century sample provided to the firm. Production of both fabrics was quietly moved to the venerable French textile firm Tassinari et Chatel, which had probably woven the Monroe era fabric, originally in crimson. The completed fabric was delivered to the United States by diplomatic pouch avoiding scrutiny by the United States Customs Service and the controversy of a foreign manufactured product. Scalamandré silks were used in the Blue Room drapery, Red Room walls, drapery, and upholstery.

Subsequent refurbishments of the White House during the Nixon, Carter, Reagan, Clinton, and both Bush administrations used stock and custom woven textiles from Scalamandré workshops. And the firm has provided silk lampas and silk and wool velvets to restoration projects in the United States Capitol.

== Civic and design recognition ==
Scalamandré received several design awards including the Gordon Gray Award for Achievement in Preservation from the National Trust for Historic Preservation and the Thomas Jefferson Award granted by the American Society of Interior Designers. He also received numerous civic citations for his work in preserving and recreating historic American textiles including one from The National Society of the Colonial Dames of America, whose several historic properties Scalamandré's firm helped restore.
