= Entrance Hall =

Primary and formal entrance to the White House

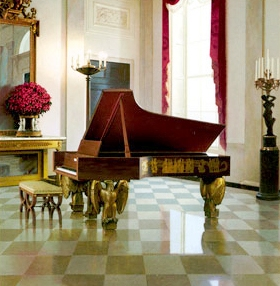
The Entrance Hall looking northwest during the administration of George W. Bush.

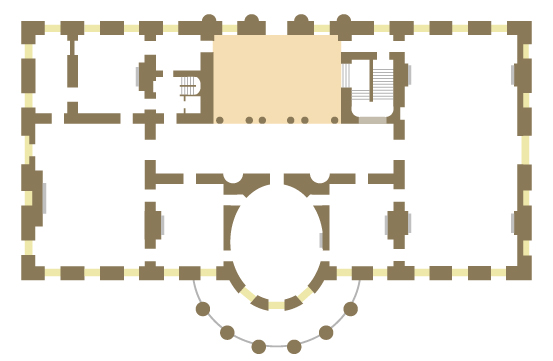
White House State Floor showing the location of the Entrance Hall.

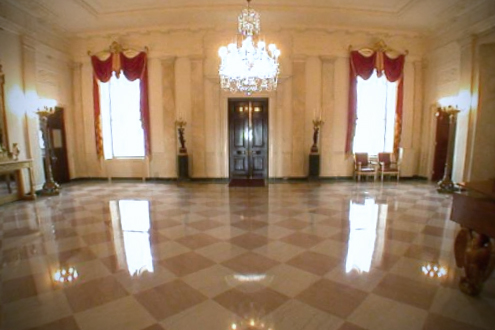
The Entrance Hall looking north

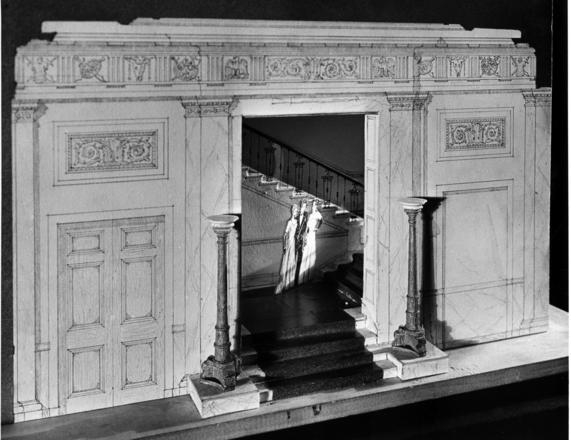
Maquette by Lorenzo Simmons Winslow showing the reorientation of the Grand Staircase to the Entrance Hall during the Truman reconstruction.

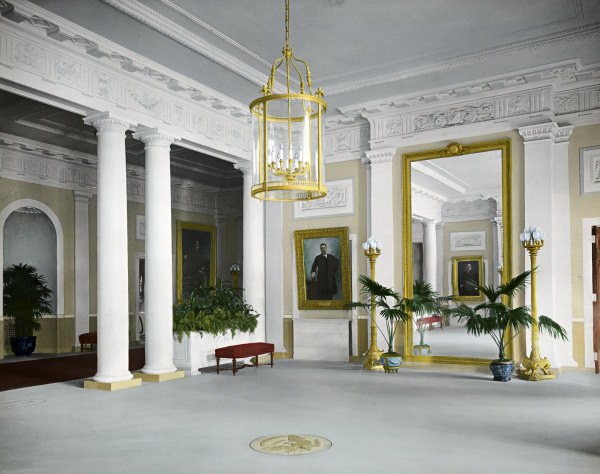
McKim, Mead, and White renovation of the Entrance Hall in 1924 during the administration of Calvin Coolidge.

An 1882 photograph shows the Tiffany screen, Brumidi frescos, and encaustic tile floor.

The Entrance Hall (also called the Grand Foyer) is the primary and formal entrance to the White House, the official residence of the president of the United States. The room is rectilinear in shape and measures approximately 31 by 44 feet. Located on the State Floor, the room is entered from outdoors through the North Portico, which faces the North Lawn and Pennsylvania Avenue. The south side of the room opens to the Cross Hall through a screen of paired Roman Doric columns. The east wall opens to the Grand Staircase.

== Hoban's 1792 and 1817 designs ==
Architect James Hoban's original floor plans show a similar room, but with single columns separating the Entrance Hall and Cross Hall, and with the Grand Staircase entering into the Cross Hall. Mid-19th century photographs show the room as rebuilt by Hoban following the 1814 White House fire. In these photographs two Ionic columns support a series of shallow arches, and a frieze of bas-relief anthemion encircling the room. The shafts of Hoban's columns are recorded as being a blue marble.

With the north entrance to the White House used frequently in this period, it was not uncommon for cold air to push into the Entrance Hall and then pass through the spaciously separated columns into the Cross Hall beyond. To remedy the draft problem, President Martin Van Buren had floor-to-ceiling glass partitions installed between the Hoban columns.

== Changes by Walter and Brumidi ==
In 1853 Thomas U. Walter installed a cast iron and clear glass screen between the Entrance Hall and Cross Hall to reduce drafts, and a complexly patterned Minton encaustic tile floor. In 1869 Constantino Brumidi, the fresco painter who had recently painted The Apotheosis of Washington in the ceiling of the new rotunda and Senate wing of the Capitol, applied highly ornamental painted decoration to the walls and ceilings including profile portraits of George Washington and Abraham Lincoln. On the ceiling Brumidi painted allegorical figures of Union and Liberty. They have survived and are displayed in the ground floor of the White House in the Palm Room.

== Tiffany and the Aesthetic Movement ==
In 1882 President Chester A. Arthur commissioned Louis Comfort Tiffany to replace Walter's clear glass panels in the screen and the front door with fashionable colored art glass. The patterns included American eagles, and a shield with stripes, stars, and the initials "U.S." in the center panel. A high example of the Aesthetic Movement, Tiffany's glass would remain into the early 20th century. A recreation of the Tiffany screen was painted by artist Peter Waddell in 2004.

== McKim's return to Neoclassicism ==
In 1902, soon after taking office and occupying the White House, President Theodore Roosevelt engaged architect Charles Follen McKim in the redesign of the White House. McKim reconfigured the house, adding wings, demolishing the greenhouses, and sweeping away the ornate late 19th century interiors. McKim attempted to make the White House interiors appear closer to how they had near the time of construction, during the period of the early republic. McKim's office McKim, Mead, and White researched the house's history, and where no clear documentation was available created rooms in the then popular Colonial Revival and Beaux Arts styles.

In the Entrance Hall, McKim removed the Tiffany screen, (Note: It has long been known that McKim, Mead & White sold the Tiffany screen at auction for $275 ($10,233 in 2025 dollars), less than a tenth of its original value. But the purchaser was not known. However, in June 2005, Harriet Stout, curator of the Chesapeake Beach Railway Museum in Chesapeake Beach, Maryland, told the producers of the PBS series Antiques Roadshow that the Chesapeake Beach Railway purchased the glass screen and had it installed at the Belvedere Hotel in Chesapeake Beach. Unfortunately, the hotel burned in 1923, and the screen was lost. Former First Daughter Margaret Truman also claimed that the screen ended up at the Belvedere Hotel in Chesapeake Beach, only to be lost to fire.) Hoban's Ionic columns, and the ornamental painting. In its place he created a far simpler neoclassical interior. On the south side of the room is a screen of single and paired Roman Doric columns. Doric pilasters are used on the east, north and west wall. A robust entablature of triglyphs, garlanded bureaucrania, ornamental cuirass, and spread Roman eagles integrate the frieze and ceiling. A simple color palette of soft ochres, gray and white contrasted dramatically with the Victorian era interior. The presidential arms were cast in bronze and installed in the center of the room's floor. Bronze torchères, still in use, and a simple lantern with a cylindrical glass chimney lit the room. McKim's new finishes though robust in form were made of plaster and stucco over wood frames hastily added to Hoban's original surfaces. While the response to McKim's interiors were positive, the Entrance Hall has been criticized for being more appropriate to a public building than a home.

== Truman reconstruction ==
By 1948 the White House had become physically unstable, and the house was temporarily vacated while a major reconstruction took place. The building's interior was dismantled, the furnishings and decorative items were stored, and a new steel frame was built within the exterior walls. President Harry S. Truman used this opportunity to reposition the entrance to the Grand Staircase. Architect Lorenzo Simmons Winslow explored several options for the reorientation of the Grand Staircase before convincing President Truman of the present configuration where it opens to the center of the east wall of the Entrance Hall. Except for the new stair opening, most of McKim's design was followed but now reinterpreted in light gray Joliet marble instead of warm hued Sienna stone and painted plaster. Cut into the stone casement around the opening to the Grand Staircase are the seals of the thirteen original American states. The Truman era floor is laid in a tessellated pattern of Westbury cream and Vermont marble. Truman thought it inappropriate to walk across the seal of the president that McKim had placed in the floor, and had the bronze seal moved to the ground floor above the entrance to the Diplomatic Reception Room. In place of the bronze seal in the floor, Truman had a polychrome painted plaster seal installed above the entrance to the Blue Room.

== Kennedy restoration ==
During the John F. Kennedy administration, the Entrance Hall (like most of the White House) underwent an extensive historic redecoration. The redecoration of the State Floor rooms, including the Entrance Hall, was overseen by American antiques autodidact Henry Francis du Pont and French interior designer Stéphane Boudin. Du Pont wanted a more historic approach to the White House, while Boudin preferred a French design aesthetic. Du Pont originally redecorated the Entrance Hall with two French pier tables, a settee, a card table, and two tables by Charles-Honoré Lannuier. Boudin had all but the pier tables removed, and his style is the one which remained over the next several decades.

== Trump renovations ==
During President Donald Trump's first term, First Lady Melania Trump played a significant role, shaping architecture, landscape, preserving historic interiors, and enhancing decorative arts to carry the White House forward. Her accomplishments include the complete renovation of the Queens' Bedroom and Bathroom, the conservation of the historic Zuber wall covering in the President's Dining Room, preservation work of the East Room floor, State Entrance and Hall marble floors, President's Elevator, and White House Bowling Alley demonstrating a broader devotion to American craftsmanship and the preservation of the People's House.

== Use over time ==
When the White House interiors were first completed during the administration of John Adams the house was primarily entered from a temporary wooden piazza on the south. President Thomas Jefferson used the Entrance Hall as a "Cabinet of Natural History" displaying finds from the Lewis and Clark Expedition.

In the 20th century the Entrance Hall has been used for official welcomes, receiving lines, small concerts, and dancing. Actor John Travolta danced with Diana, Princess of Wales in 1985; in 1998 First Lady Hillary Clinton danced here with Czech President Václav Havel.

== Furnishings ==
On the west wall of the room is a gilded beech French Empire pier table (c. 1812) by cabinetmaker Pierre-Antoine Bellange purchased for the Blue Room by President James Monroe. On the pier table is an ormolu French Empire mantel clock featuring a sculpture of Minerva. This clock was manufactured by the bronzier Pierre-Philippe Thomire and also bought by Monroe, it was previously located in the Blue Room.

In the southeast and southwest corners of the Entrance Hall are crimson and gold upholstered French Empire banquettes acquired by interior designer Stéphane Boudin of Maison Jansen during the John F. Kennedy administration. The McKim era bronze torchères remain in the room. A pair of Louis XVI torchères flank the door leading to the North Portico. A pair of armchairs commissioned for the Blue Room in 1902 and based on a suite of chairs designed by Jacob-Desmalter in the Salon des Fleurs of the Château de Compiègne are placed on the North wall.

== Bibliography ==
- Abbott, James A.; Rice, Elaine M. (1998). Designing Camelot: The Kennedy White House Restoration. New York: Van Nostrand Reinhold. ISBN 0442025327.
- Beschloss, Michael (2008). Presidential Courage: Brave Leaders and How They Changed America, 1789-1989. New York: Simon and Schuster. ISBN 9780743257442.
- Commission on the Renovation of the Executive Mansion (1952). Report of the Commission on the Renovation of the Executive Mansion. Washington, D.C.: U.S. Government Printing Office. hdl:2027/wu.89037168200.
- Kloss, William (1992). Art in the White House: A Nation's Pride. Washington, D.C.: White House Historical Association. ISBN 9781931917018.
- Scott, Pamela (1995). Temple of Liberty: Building the Capitol for a New Nation. New York: Oxford University Press. ISBN 0195098587.
- Seale, William (1992). The White House: The History of an American Idea. Washington, D.C.: American Institute of Architects Press. ISBN 0912308850.
- Truman, Margaret (2003). The President's House: A First Daughter Shares the History and Secrets of the World's Most Famous Home. New York: Ballantine Books. ISBN 9780345444523.
- Wolff, Perry; Kennedy, Jacqueline (1962). A Tour of the White House with Mrs. John F. Kennedy. New York: Doubleday.
