= White House Library =

Room in the White House, Washington, D.C.

Coordinates: 38°53′51.6″N 77°2′10.8″W

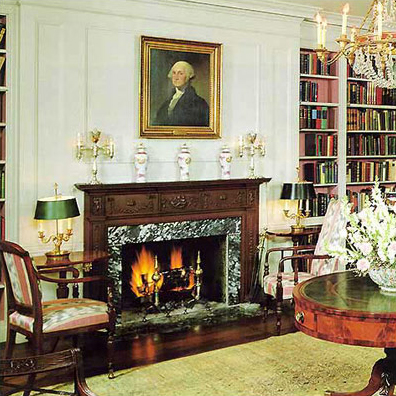
The White House Library looking west, northwest during the Clinton administration

White House ground floor showing location of the White House Library

The White House Library is a room in the White House, the official home of the president of the United States. The room is approximately 27 by 23 feet (8.2 by 7.0 m) and is in the northeast corner of the ground floor. The library is used for teas and meetings hosted by the president and first lady. During the 1950s reconstruction of the White House, old building lumber from the house was salvaged and re-made into wall paneling for this room. Several basement rooms in the White House are paneled with salvaged building materials from the pre-reconstructed White House.

== History ==
John Adams, the first president to live in the White House, used this room as a laundry room; at that time, it was said to have been filled with "Tubs, Buckets, and a variety of Lumber"; at the time, lumber meant "miscellaneous useless articles that are stored away". During Millard Fillmore's presidency (1850–1853), congressional funding was requested to establish a White House library. The library was established during the Fillmore presidency, spearheaded by the first lady, Abigail Fillmore. This library was originally in the Yellow Oval Room and was maintained there until 1929, when the Hoover administration moved it to its current location. By the time of this relocation, almost no books remained in the mansion, so the American Booksellers Association donated books and continued to do so in subsequent administrations. The room saw slight modifications until the Truman reconstruction in 1952, when the room was paneled in salvaged timbers from the White House's former timber frame. These were left unpainted until the administration of John F. Kennedy, when decorator Stéphane Boudin recreated the room as a painted Federal style parlor.

To stand out, an unusual lighthouse clock was made by Simon Willard to commemorate the visit of the Marquis de Lafayette to the United States in 1824–1825. A likeness of Lafayette appears in a medallion on its base.

The library provides access to a men's lounge and restroom.
