= Bellange =

Bellange and Bellangé are French surnames. Notable people with the surname include:

Bellange

- Jacques Bellange (c. 1575 – 1616), artist and printmaker

Bellangé

- Hippolyte Bellangé (1800–1866), French painter
- Pierre-Antoine Bellangé (1757–1827), French furniture designer
