= Yellow Oval Room =

Room in the White House in Washington, D.C., United States

Coordinates: 38.8976°N 77.0366°W

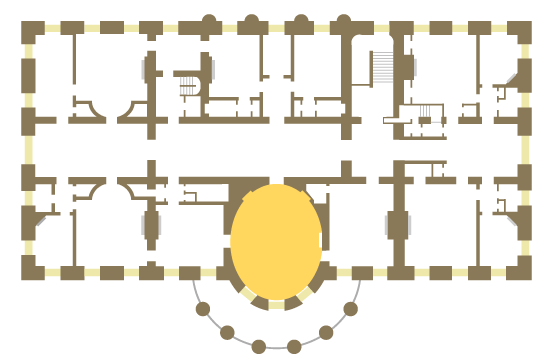
Location of the Yellow Oval Room on the second floor of the White House

The Yellow Oval Room is an oval room located on the south side of the second floor in the White House, the official residence of the president of the United States. First used as a drawing room in the John Adams administration, it has been used as a library, office, and family parlor. While First Lady Dolley Madison in the early 1800s decorated it in yellow damask, it was not officially designated the Yellow Oval Room until the restoration overseen by First Lady Jacqueline Kennedy in the 1960s. Today the Yellow Oval Room is used for small receptions and for greeting heads of state immediately before a state dinner.

The room is entered from the Center Hall on the north side of the room. Three large windows on the south side of the room face the South Lawn and The Ellipse. The southwest window has a swing-sash door leading outside to the Truman Balcony. Double doors on the west side of the room, with flags of the United States and of the presidency on either side, lead to the president and first lady's bedrooms, private sitting room and dressing room.

== History ==
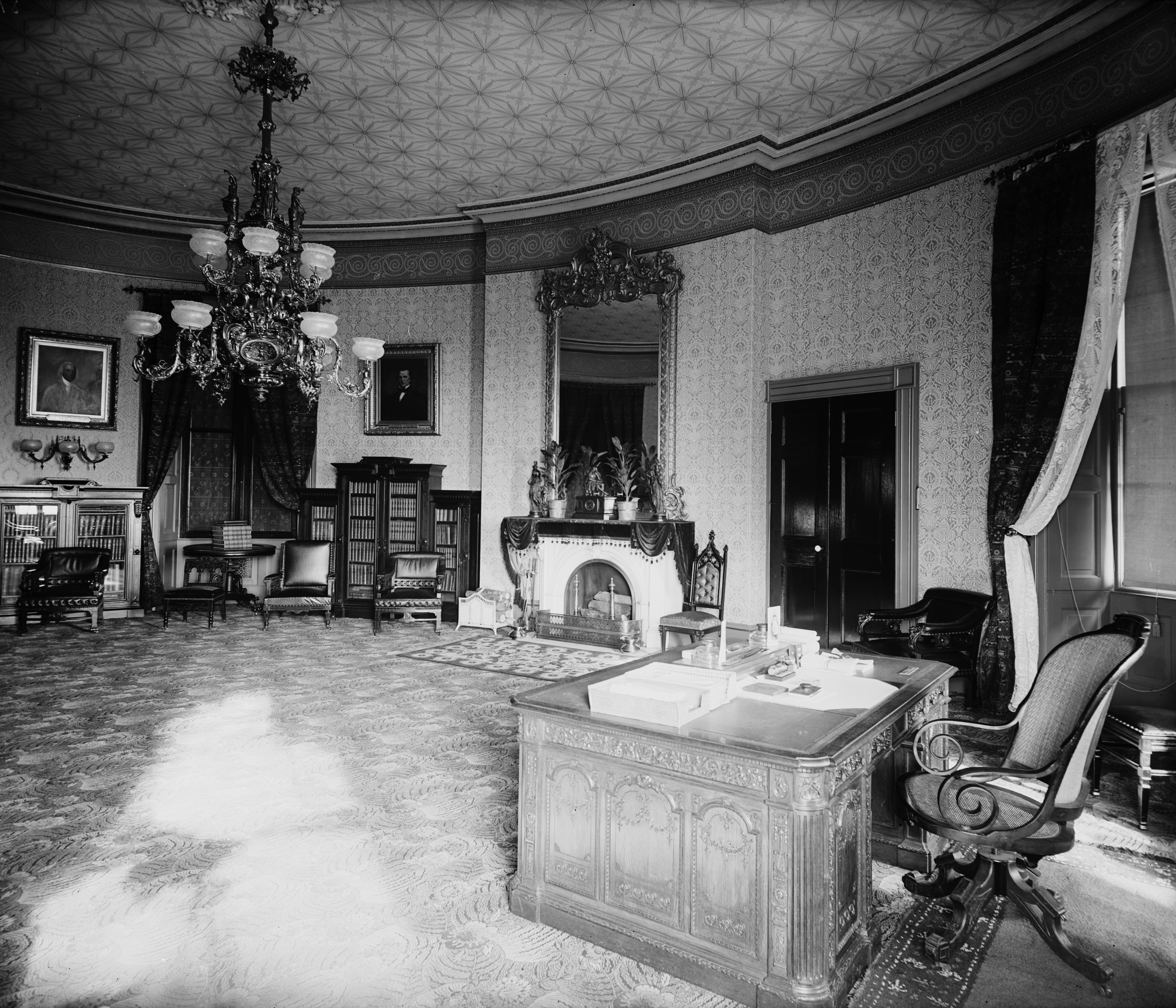
Yellow Oval Room in 1886, then known as the upper oval room

On January 1, 1801, and before it was even complete, John Adams held the first presidential reception in this room, known then only as "the upstairs oval parlor." Dolley Madison first decorated the room in yellow damask in 1809.

In 1851, Abigail Fillmore got an allocation from Congress for books to make the room into the first White House Library. The Harrisons continued to use the room as a library and family parlor and, in 1889, put the first White House Christmas tree here.

Franklin D. Roosevelt converted the room into his study, and it was in this room on December 7, 1941, that he learned of the Japanese attack on Pearl Harbor. The Secret Service moved his desk away from the windows as a security precaution. Harry Truman continued to use the room as a study and opened access to a new balcony he added, called the "Truman Balcony," to the South Portico in 1948. Following the Truman reconstruction the room was decorated by B. Altman and Company, New York with reproduction traditional furniture. Later presidents reserved the room as a parlor for formal receptions and used the Treaty Room, just to the east, as a private study instead.

== Furnishings ==
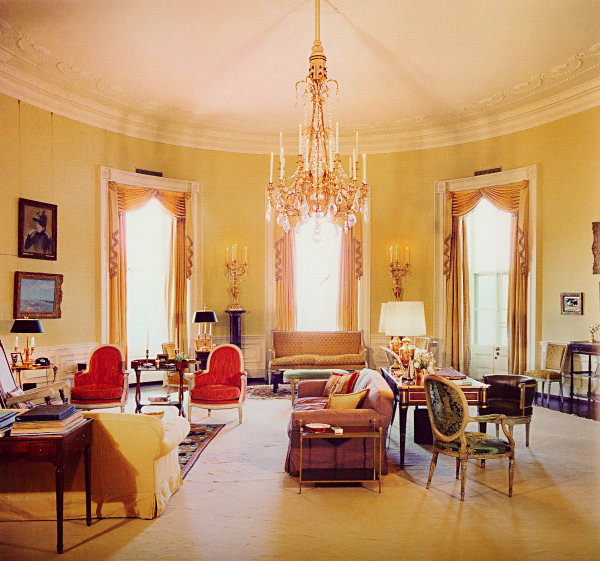
The Yellow Oval Room during the administration of President John F. Kennedy, as decorated by Sister Parish and Stéphane Boudin

The earliest written description of the room dates to the John Adams administration, and describes the room as a ladies drawing room. The room was papered in yellow with gilded stars, and a suite of crimson furniture. This furniture, likely a mix of Louis XVI and English Hepplewhite styles, was moved from the President's House in Philadelphia.

With the building of the West Wing in 1902, and moving of offices out of the residence, this oval room was again used as a parlor. Franklin Roosevelt used it as an office and library in the residence and would often serve after-work drinks to guests and work on his stamp collection. Following the Truman reconstruction the room was once more used for state events and entertaining. During the Kennedy Administration the room was designated as a drawing room and received many of the furnishings now located there as well as its designation as the Yellow Oval Room. The American interior designer Sister Parish established the basic design of the room by painting the walls a soft yellow, joined by a pale yellow oval carpet topped by Oriental rugs. The French interior designer Stéphane Boudin built upon Parish's contributions, replacing the Truman era hotel style furniture with late 18th and early 19th century French antiques. The furnishings today are mostly in the Louis XVI style, assembled during the Kennedy restoration. Two short columns of green marble were designed by Stéphane Boudin to hold antique, electrified candelabras and Boudin also found the bronze doré and rock crystal 18th century chandelier in Paris for the room. A suite of American manufactured painted wood Neoclassical settee, six armchairs and four side chairs, were reupholstered in a wool and silk velvet faux tiger print during the administration of George W. Bush and moved to the adjoining Center Hall.

Under the direction of Pat Nixon, the room was refurbished (although the project was not complete until just after President Nixon's resignation). The Yellow Oval Room was redesigned in a more academic style by the Nixons' new curator, Clement Conger, with architect and interior designer Edward Vason Jones. Vason Jones replaced Sister Parish's simple curtains that fit within the window frames with the current grander gold and coral stripe that cover the woodwork, somewhat reducing the sense of height of the room. A settee and two matching chairs, crafted for President James Monroe in 1805, were donated by a resident of Houston, Texas. A Hereke carpet from Turkey and four bergère enclosed armchairs from France were also added to the room. The total cost of the renovation was $400,000 ($2,611,336 in 2025 dollars).

During the Carter administration, American Impressionist paintings, including those of Mary Cassatt, were acquired and hung in this room and the Center Hall.

Nancy Reagan, with her designer Ted Graber, brought back the two upholstered sofas used by Jacqueline Kennedy in the room. Laura Bush, working with her family decorator Ken Blasingame, replaced these sofas with similar ones of a slightly larger scale; returned a number of bouillotte lamps to the room; and added an overmantel mirror. She also re-installed the chandelier from the Kennedy era, which Pat Nixon had replaced with an overscale, Empire chandelier, formerly in the Kennedy Blue Room.
