= G. Hermann Kinnicutt =

American investment banker (1877–1943)

- Born: Gustav Hermann Kinnicutt; January 23, 1877; New York City, U.S.
- Died: December 6, 1943 (aged 66); New York City, U.S.
- Education: Harvard University
- Employer(s): Kissel, Kinnicutt & Co. Kidder, Peabody & Co.
- Spouse: May Appleton Tuckerman (m. 1907)
- Children: 4, including Sister Parish

Gustav Hermann Kinnicutt (January 23, 1877 – December 6, 1943) was a prominent American investment banker.

== Early life ==
Kinnicutt was born on January 23, 1877, in New York City. He was the eldest of two sons born to Susanna Eleonora (née Kissel) (1852–1910) and Dr. Francis Parker Kinnicutt (1846–1913), who served for many years as trustee and president of Columbia-Presbyterian Medical Center. Dr. Kinnicutt was also a close friend of novelist Edith Wharton, and owned a "rambling Colonial Revival house on Cliffwood Street overlooking the golf course," known as Deepdene in Lenox, Massachusetts.

He was named after his maternal grandfather, Gustav Hermann Kissel, a Hesse born banker.

Kinnicutt graduated from Harvard University in 1896.

== Career ==
In 1900, Kinnicutt began his banking career with J.P. Morgan & Co. In 1904, he organized his own firm, known as Kinnicutt & Potter, which continued through various name changes, including Kissel, Kinnicutt & Co. with his uncle, Gustav Kissel.

During World War I, Kinnicutt was chairman of the Liberty Loan Committee in New Jersey. In 1922, Kissel, Kinnicutt & Co. offered $3,000,000 in farm loan bonds for Chicago Joint Stock Land Bank. In December 1931, it was announced that Kissel, Kinnicutt & Co. would merge with Kidder, Peabody & Co., at which point, Kinnicutt joined the new firm as a general partner on January 1, 1932.

In 1934, Kinnicutt appeared in Washington before the House Interstate Commerce Committee as a representative of eighteen investment firms from New York to "protest what was termed the paralyzing legislation of the Fletcher-Rayburn stock exchange bill." He also joined with other prominent investment bankers to demand Federal supervision over regulation of stock markets.

At the time of his death, he was a senior partner with Kidder, Peabody which was located at 17 Wall Street.

== Personal life ==
On April 18, 1907, Kinnicutt married to May Appleton Tuckerman (1886–1947) at the Church of the Incantation at Madison Avenue and 35th Street. She was the daughter of Annie Cotton (née Smith) and Bayard Tuckerman and sister of Bayard Tuckerman Jr. Together, the Kinnicutts had homes in Manhattan, Maine, Paris, and a large summer home in Far Hills, New Jersey, known as Mayfields. May and Hermann were the parents of four children, three of whom lived to adulthood:

- Francis Parker Kinnicutt (1908–1961), who married Sybil Kane Jay (1914–1997) on February 14, 1937.
- Dorothy May Kinnicutt (1910–1994), who married banker Henry Parish II on February 14, 1930.
- Gustav Hermann Kinnicutt Jr. (1912–1984), who married Iréne (née Schultze) Solmsen in 1948.
- Bayard Tuckerman Kinnicutt (1920–1934), who died aged 17 while playing baseball at St. Mark's School in Southboro, Massachusetts.

Kinnicutt collected antiques, including furniture later described by his interior designer daughter as "that awful English brown." Like his father, he served as a trustee of the Columbia-Presbyterian Medical Center, and also as president of the Presbyterian Hospital School of Nursing.

Kinnicutt died of a heart ailment on December 6, 1943, at 65 East 82nd Street, his home in Manhattan. After a funeral at the Episcopal Church of the Ascension on Fifth Avenue, attended by more than 400 mourners, he was buried at Saint Bernards Cemetery in Bernardsville, New Jersey.
