= Sister Parish =

American interior decorator and socialite

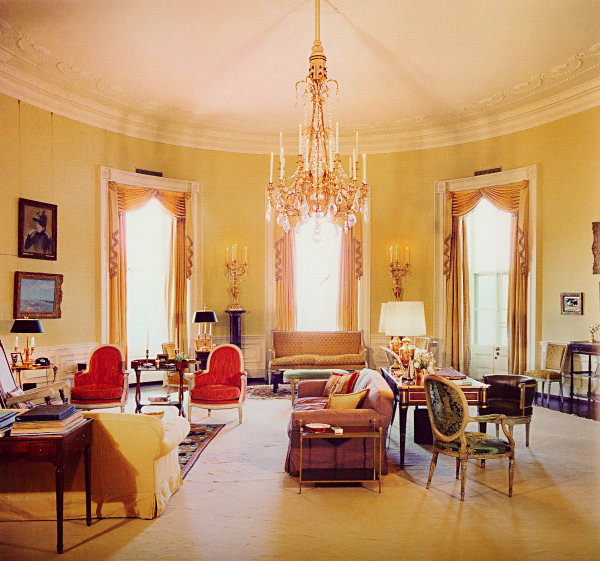
The Yellow Oval Room at the White House during the administration of President John F. Kennedy, as decorated by Sister Parish.

Sister Parish (born Dorothy May Kinnicutt; July 15, 1910 – September 8, 1994) was an American interior decorator and socialite. She was the first practitioner brought in to decorate the White House during the John F. Kennedy administration, a position soon entrusted to French interior decorator Stéphane Boudin. Despite Boudin's growing influence, Parish's influence can still be seen at the White House, particularly in the Yellow Oval Room.

== Early life ==
Sister Parish was born Dorothy May Kinnicutt on July 15, 1910, in Morristown, New Jersey. Her parents were G. Hermann Kinnicutt and May Appleton Tuckerman. Parish was born at home in a four poster bed. Her paternal grandfather was Francis Kinnicutt, Edith Wharton's doctor and close friend. In addition to their New Jersey house, the family had homes in Manhattan, Maine, and Paris. She was given the nickname Sister by her three-year-old brother Frankie.

As a child, Parish attended the Peck School in New Jersey, in the fall and spring. During the winter, she attended Chapin School in New York. Later, she boarded at Foxcroft School in Virginia.

Parish was a debutante in 1927. Once she had completed high school, her parents expected her to marry, and on Valentine's Day 1930, Kinnicutt married banker Henry Parish II at St. George's Episcopal Church in Manhattan.

After the wedding, the couple lived on East End Avenue in Manhattan (in an apartment done by a decorator), followed by a farmhouse on Long Lane in Far Hills, New Jersey, which Parish decorated herself. In decorating the Long Lane house, Parish found her own sense of style. She painted wood furniture white and used cotton fabrics such as ticking stripe. She experimented with brightly painted floors. Parish's new home was lighter and more casual than other high society homes of the 1930s.

Parish spent most of her summers in her house in Islesboro, Maine.

== Early career ==
The Great Depression tightened the family's finances and in 1933 the 23 year old opened a decorating business. Her Far Hills, New Jersey, office measured 14 feet by 14 feet and cost $35 a month. Parish outfitted the room with wicker furniture and hung a sign that said "Mrs. Henry Parish II, Interiors."

At the time she opened her business, Parish was completely untrained. She had never read a book on decorating or served any kind of apprenticeship. Parish's family helped influence her style. May's first cousin was acclaimed interior decorator Dorothy Draper. May's father collected antiques.

Parish's earliest work was decorating the houses of friends.

== Jacqueline Kennedy and the White House ==
Parish met Jacqueline Kennedy socially in the late 1950s and helped her decorate the Georgetown house the family lived in while John F. Kennedy was a senator. After Kennedy was elected President in 1960, Jackie hired Parish to help with the redecorating of the White House. Parish's name led to some confusion, with one newspaper proclaiming: ''Kennedys Pick Nun to Decorate White House.''

Prior to moving into the White House, the Kennedys leased a country house in Virginia called Glen Ora. Parish spent $10,000 redecorating the home; the cost enraged Jack Kennedy. The Kennedys had to restore the house to its previous look before vacating.

In a letter to Sister Parish, Jackie Kennedy explained her plans for the White House:

I want our private quarters to be heaven for us naturally—but use as much of (the Eisenhowers') stuff as possible & buy as little new—as I want to spend lots of my budget below in the public rooms—which people see & will do you & I proud!

— Jacqueline Kennedy

Parish used the Georgetown living room she had previously designed as a blueprint for the West Sitting Hall, painting everything off-white, installing bookcases for Jackie's collection of art books and paintings.

Parish and Jackie spent the entire budget of $50,000 allocated for the redecoration of the White House on the private quarters in the first two weeks. Winterthur Museum Director Charles Montgomery suggested the formation of a committee to acquire antique furnishings for the White House. The goal was to help furnish the White House with authentic pieces from a century and a half earlier. Noted collector Henry du Pont was made chair of the committee and Sister Parish was among the committee members. Parish and DuPont concentrated on including American Federalist furniture in the Sheraton and Hepplewhite styles.

Much of Parish's work updating the White House was simple, like rehanging curtains inside rather than outside moldings. But some of the redesign was more complicated. As part of her redesign, Parish added a kitchen, pantry and dining room to the family unit on the second floor. Prior to this remodel, the first family had to go downstairs to the kitchen that serviced the State Dining Room whenever they wanted something to eat.

Through Parish, Steuben Glass Works offered a donation of crystal that Jackie refused in favor of Morgantown Glassware Guild in West Virginia.

Toward the end of the project, a rift occurred. According to Parish's granddaughter, ''it was primarily a problem over money and Jackie's belief that not everything had to be paid for. Sister wrote that it was because someone had told Jackie that she had kicked Caroline. I wouldn't have put it past her, but that was not the root of the falling-out. Later, Sister would shrug off the questions with one of her glib remarks, like 'Jackie got along much better with men than with women.' ''

Although Parish initially decorated the family's private quarters, Stephane Boudin of Paris was hired to decorate the State Rooms. Boudin decorated the Red Room, the Treaty Room, the Lincoln Sitting Room and the Blue Room of the Kennedy White House. After Parish and Kennedy fell out, Boudin returned to the White House to add his French style to the private rooms. However, the Yellow Oval Room, the Kennedys' semi-formal drawing room, remained primarily Parish's design.

== Work with Albert Hadley ==
In 1962, a young designer named Albert Hadley introduced himself to Parish. His first assignment with Parish was the breakfast room of the Kennedy White House. “I only did the curtains,” he said in 1999. Hadley became a full partner two years later. Parish and [Hadley] would continue to work together until Parish's death in 1994. The firm was a training ground for dozens of designers now acclaimed in their own right including Bunny Williams and Thom Filicia. According to Harold Simmons, "Parish-Hadley influenced a whole generation of decorators and many of the top New York decorators went through the firm at some point in their careers."

In 1967, House & Garden magazine ran spreads of Parish's summer house, bursting with wicker and needlepoint and other crafts. According to the New York Times, this departure from traditional decorating was on par with fashion's introduction to Dior's New Look.

Parish and Hadley worked with quilters from Selma, Alabama, in the late 1960s to develop patchwork quilted yard goods. The Freedom Quilting Bee was born in the Civil Rights Movement as a way for poor black craftswomen to earn money for their families. Many of the group's members participated in Civil Rights demonstrations. Parish-Hadley collaborated with the Freedom Quilting Bee from 1967 to 1969, bringing old-fashioned quilts to high style publications. The partnership ended naturally with the Freedom Quilting Bee moving on to other contracts and Parish-Hadley moving on to other looks.

Parish and Hadley stocked handwoven Irish rugs and baskets and other crafts in a small invitation-only shop on New York's Upper East Side. As the items were photographed in magazines, they spread into the mainstream.

In 1988 Sarah, Duchess of York, hired Parish to decorate a new country house near Windsor Castle. The cost of Parish's work was estimated at $1 million. Queen Elizabeth II later rescinded the assignment in favor of an English designer, but just getting in the door was considered a triumph.

== Style ==
Parish is widely considered to have originated what became known as American country style. She avoided matching, filling homes with contrasting prints and sometimes intentionally placed items off center.

A 1999 Architectural Digest article described Parish's style: "Her interiors as a rule were refreshingly unstudied, unself-conscious, and unstrained...A Sister Parish room overflowed, to be sure—but buoyantly. It was romantic and whimsical but not sentimental; and, always, it was light—the rug might be Aubusson, the mirror Chippendale and the chandelier Waterford, but she undercut these "brand names" with all manner of charming distractions. Her living rooms lived: They were friendly to the world..."

In 1994, House Beautiful editor Lou Gropp said, "There is no question that Sister Parish was one of the biggest influences on decorating in the United States. She dominated the decorating of the 1970s and '80s, and many of her ideas that were fresh and new in the 1970s are now in the mainstream of American decorating."

Signature elements of the Parish look included painted floors, Anglo-Franco furniture, painted furniture, chintz, needlepoint pillows, mattress ticking, hooked rugs, rag rugs, starched organdy, botanical prints, painted lampshades, white wicker, quilts, and baskets.

According to a 2000 New York Times article, "If you have a quilt, you probably owe it to Mrs. Parish."

Her work influenced Ralph Lauren and Martha Stewart.

== Notable clients ==
- Jacqueline and John Kennedy
- Sarah, Duchess of York
- Brooke Astor
- Jane and Charles Engelhard
- Babe and Bill Paley
- Betsey and Jock Whitney
- Ann and Gordon Getty

== Later life ==
Parish stayed on as a partner in the firm into her 80s. She died September 8, 1994, in Maine.

== See also ==
- Lewis, Adam (2010). The Great Lady Decorators: The Women Who Defined Interior Design, 1870-1955. New York: Rizzoli. ISBN 978-0-8478-3336-8.
