= Lampas =

Type of woven textile

Lampas is a type of luxury fabric created on a draw loom with a background weft (a "ground weave") typically in taffeta with supplementary wefts (the "pattern wefts") laid on top and forming a design, sometimes also with a "brocading weft". Lampas is typically woven in silk, and often has gold and silver thread enrichment. The lampas technique could be used to create complex designs, including figural and floral motifs in a range of colors. The designs could at time reflect cultural significance depending on where and for what purpose it was created. The use of lampas was not limited to clothing; it was also employed for interior furnishings, including curtains and upholstery, as well as tapestry. Lampas can be seen in both modern weaving and throughout history, where it spread through trade routes and cultural exchanges.

== History ==
A Lampas weave is one of the five basic weaving techniques—the others being tabby, twill, Damask, and tapestry—of the early Middle Ages Byzantine and Middle Eastern weaving centers. Lampas-weave was often associated with the silk industry and luxury market, often incorporating gilt threads. This is not surprising, since such a complex fabric would commonly be woven in expensive materials such as silk and precious metal.

Lampas in Asia and the Middle East

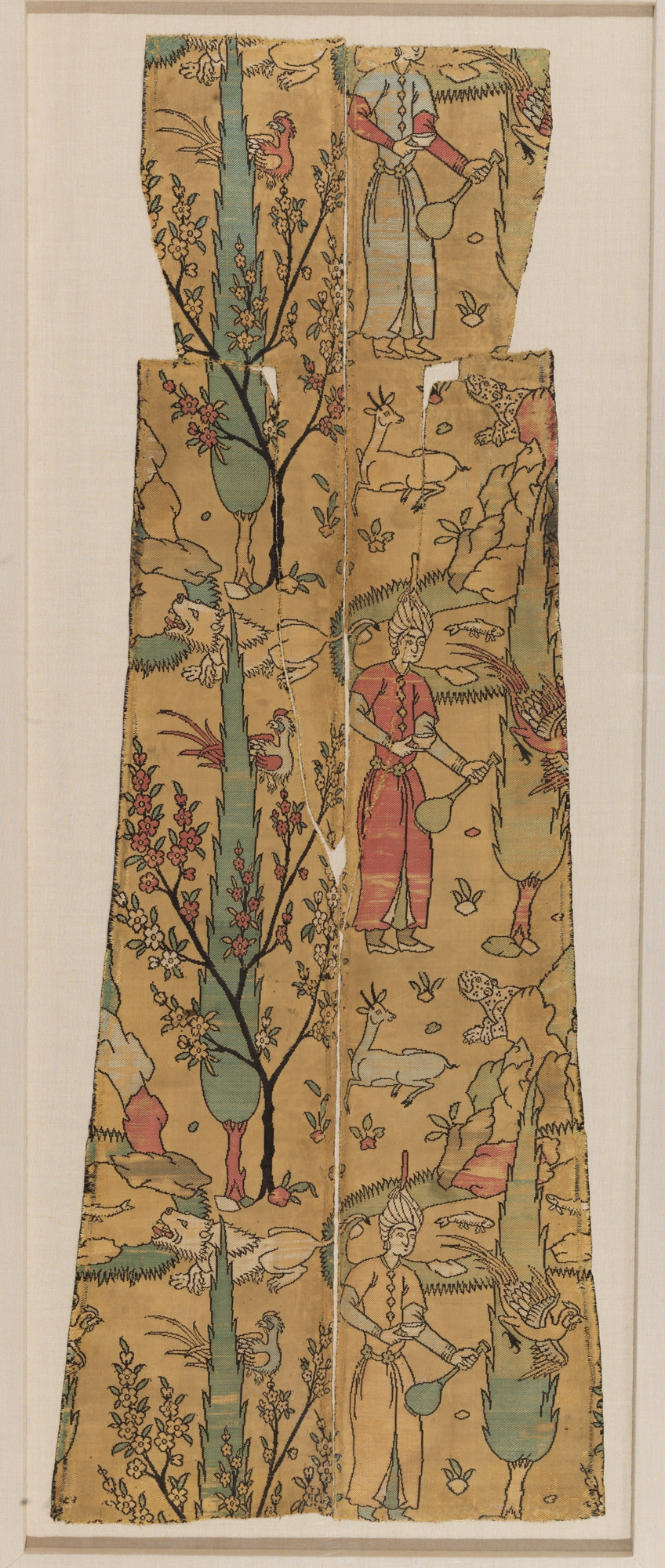
Textile Fragment Depicting a Figure in a Landscape from the Metropolitan Museum of Art

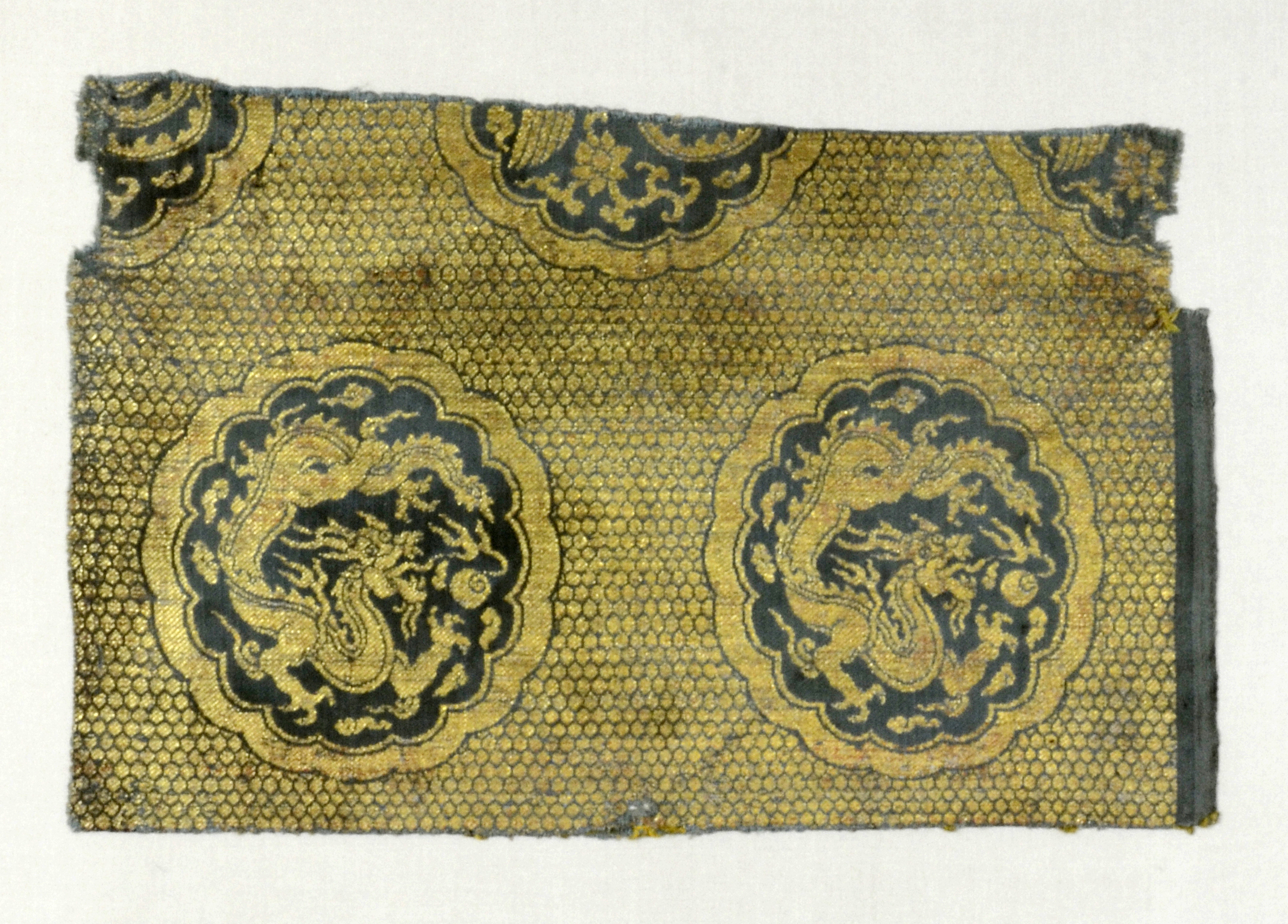
Yuan Dynasty Cloth of Gold Lampas textile with Dragons

While the word Lampas itself is French in origin, the textile was actually developed in Central Asia in the 10th century CE and could be found in places including but not limited to China, India, Syria, Iran, Iraq, and Egypt. The rapid adoption of the textile across Asia as well as Europe can be attributed to the fact that it was a sturdy yet flexible weave and could be made relatively quickly.

Particular developments were made to the textile in the Safavid court in Iran. Lampas was produced within workshops in urban centers such as Yazd and Kashan and was traded both within and beyond the Iranian border. Several examples of Safavid era textiles have survived and they demonstrate the ability of lampas to capture large figural scenes using a variety of colors, creating an effect similar to a painting. The subject of the weaves in Safavid Iran often took inspiration from Persian poetry epics and the manuscript paintings commissioned by the Shahs. The structure of leadership in Safavid Iran under the Shah was one of the reasons why lampas production was so successful there. Royal workshops were established under Shah Tahmasp (1524–1576) which stimulated textile production and the refinement of weaving techniques. Under Shah Abbas I (1587–1629) the state sponsored textile manufacturing program continued and the exportation of luxury textiles including silk lampas to heads of state and religious leaders could be seen.

During the time of lampas production in Safavid Iran there was also a thriving textile market in China. In fact several Yuan dynasty style motifs can be seen in the lampas patterns of Eastern Iran during the Ilkanhid period. Lampas was popular as a luxury weave within China during this time, with gold and silver threads being used in motifs.

Similar to the structure of royal workshops in Safavid Iran, the Ottoman Empire also centralized textile production within their empire. Weaving workshops in Bursa were well established by the fifteenth century, and were the main producers of Lampas or kemha as it is known in Turkish. Ottoman lampas and velvet textiles often featured large-scale design patterns featuring floral motifs that were designed by the nakkaşhane, the central palace workshop.

Indian textiles also demonstrate use of the lampas technique, with particular historical records of its use in Assam, a city that was known for its silk production and place along the Silk Road trade routes. The Vrindavani Vastra is a surviving religious drape from the 16th century that illustrates the childhood activities of Lord Krishna. Its large size of more than nine meters in length and important spiritual context depicted through the weaving process of lampas shows that the technique was labor intensive and required an immense amount of skill.

Lampas in Europe After lampas developed in Central Asia in the 10th century CE it reached Islamic Spain by the 12th c. CE. Al-Andalus, and particularly Granada quickly became a producer and distributor of lampas textiles to Christian kings throughout Europe. The lampas weave was particularly sought after for its sumptuousness, often being worn by religious and political elites. By the 13th century, Lampas-weave had become the dominant technique for the figured silks woven in Italy. Lucca, Venice, Florence, Bologna, and Genoa are known to have been the principal silk weaving cities in Italy during the 14th and 15th centuries, although it is not known which was the main producer of lampas. Beginning late in the 17th century western lampas production began centered in Lyon, France, where an industry of providing for French and other European courts became centered. Lampas was a very popular weave during the Rococo era of the Bourbon monarchy and can be seen in the decoration of the Petit Trianon at Versailles as well as in court clothing.

=== Modern lampas weaving ===
Lampas continues to be used as a luxury weaving technique to this day. Some notable examples of Lampas weave can be seen in the White House Blue Room. Silk lampas chairs were woven by Scalamandré Silks in 1995 based on a c. 1816 French design.

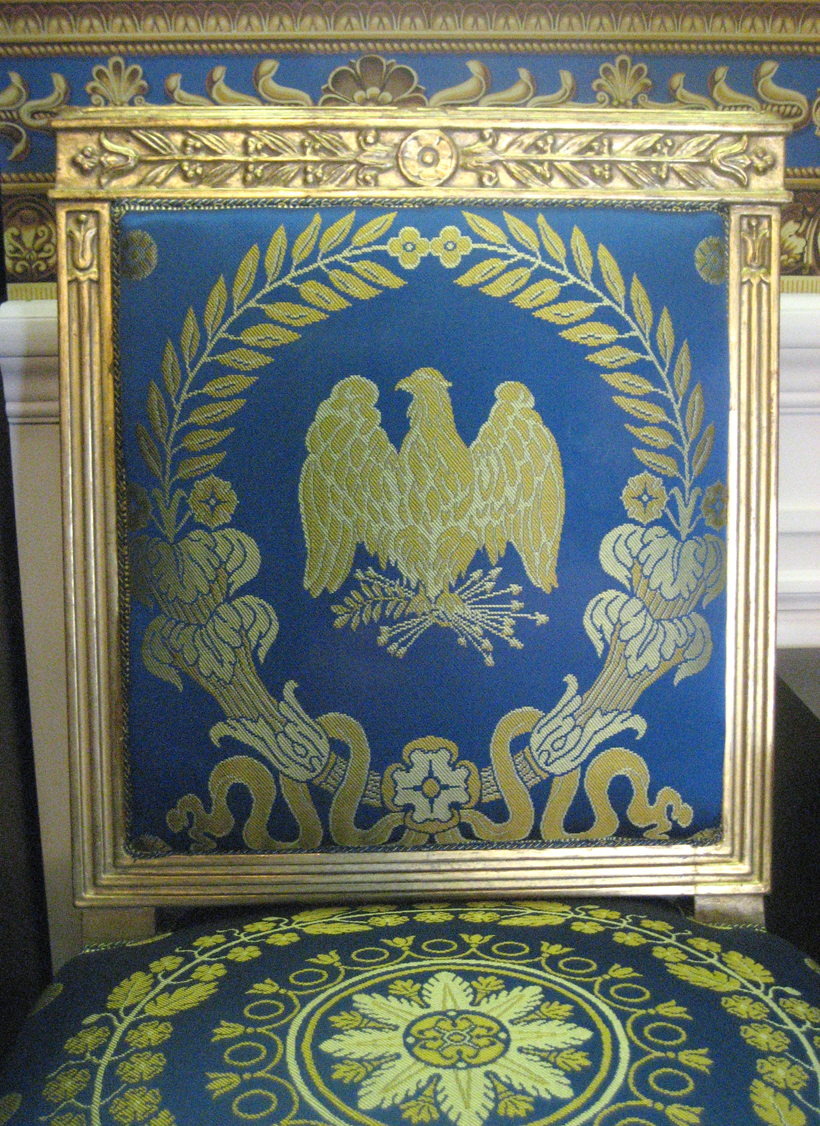
Silk lampas weave used on White House Blue Room chairs

== Gallery ==
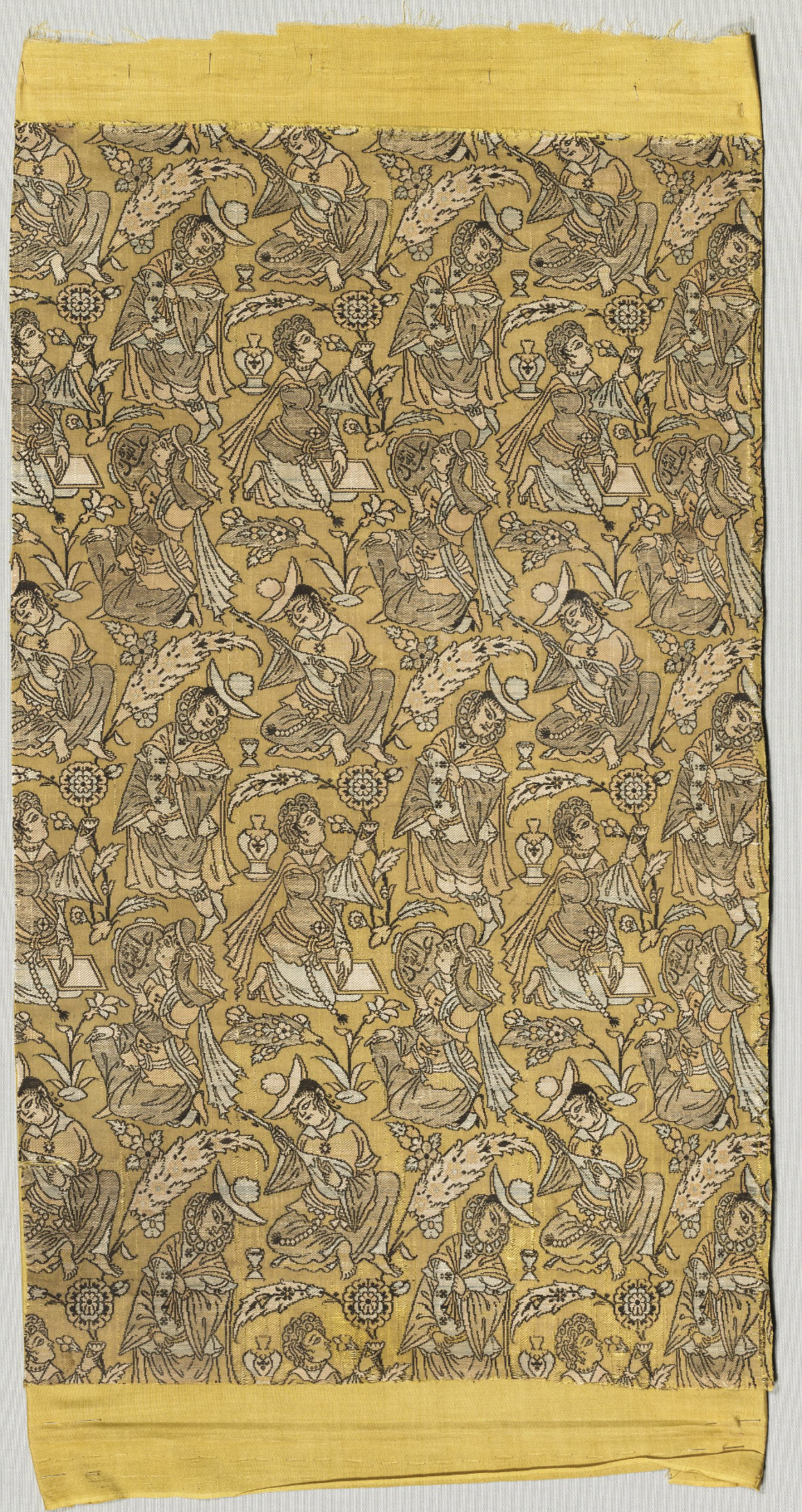
Safavid Lampas with dancers and musicians

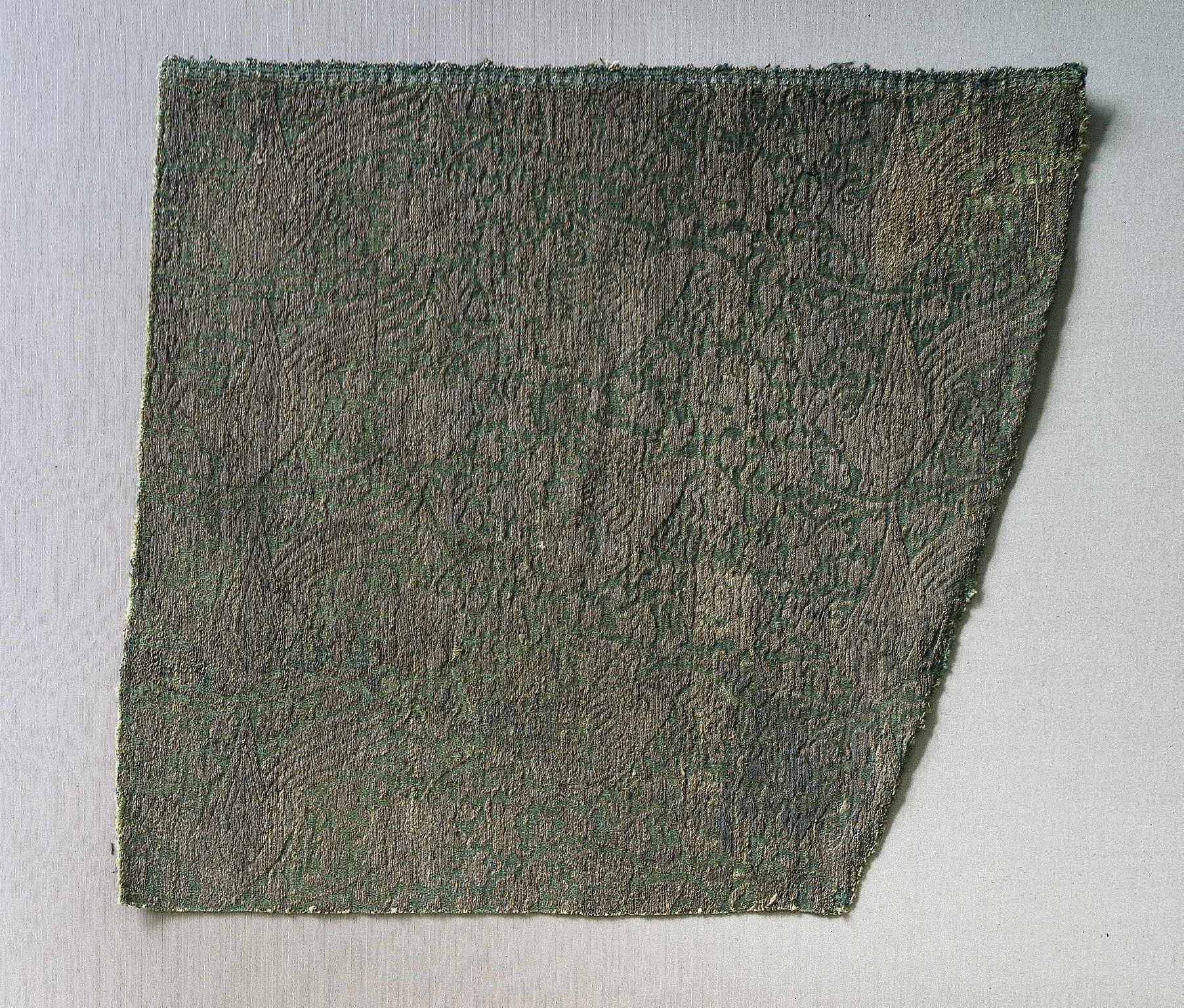
Ilkhanid period Iranian Lampas with Chinese inspired Phoenix and Vine pattern

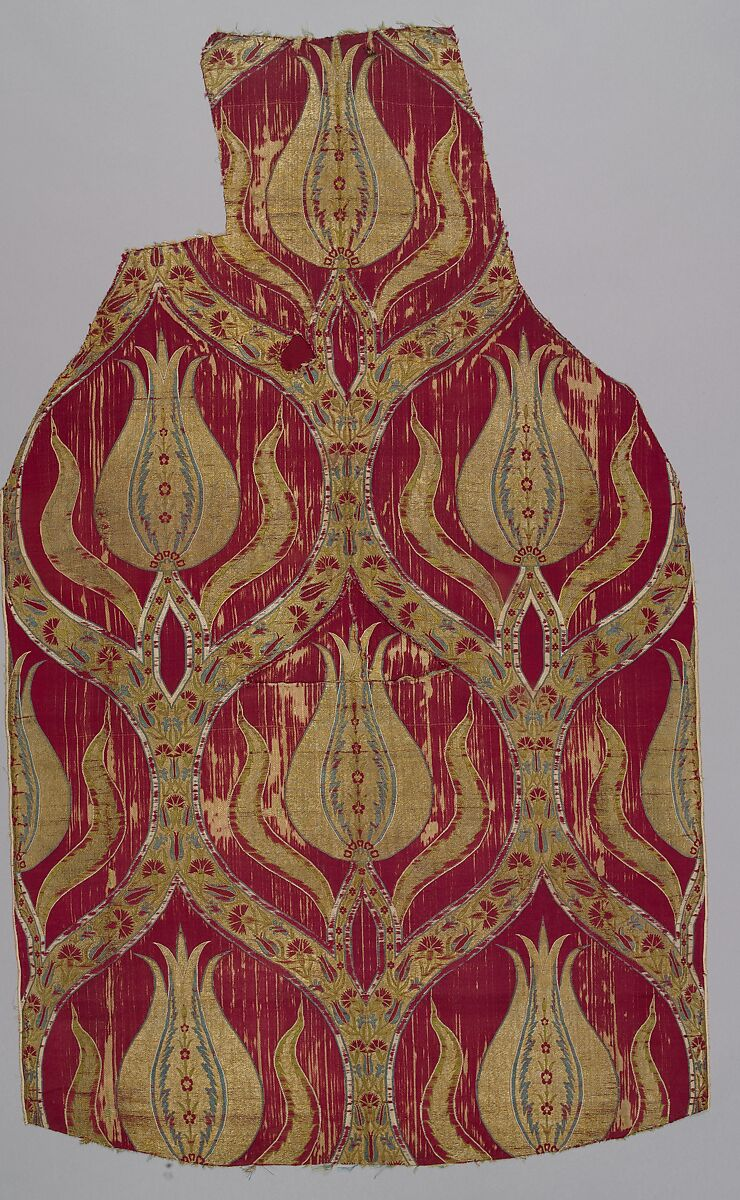
Ottoman Lampas fragment

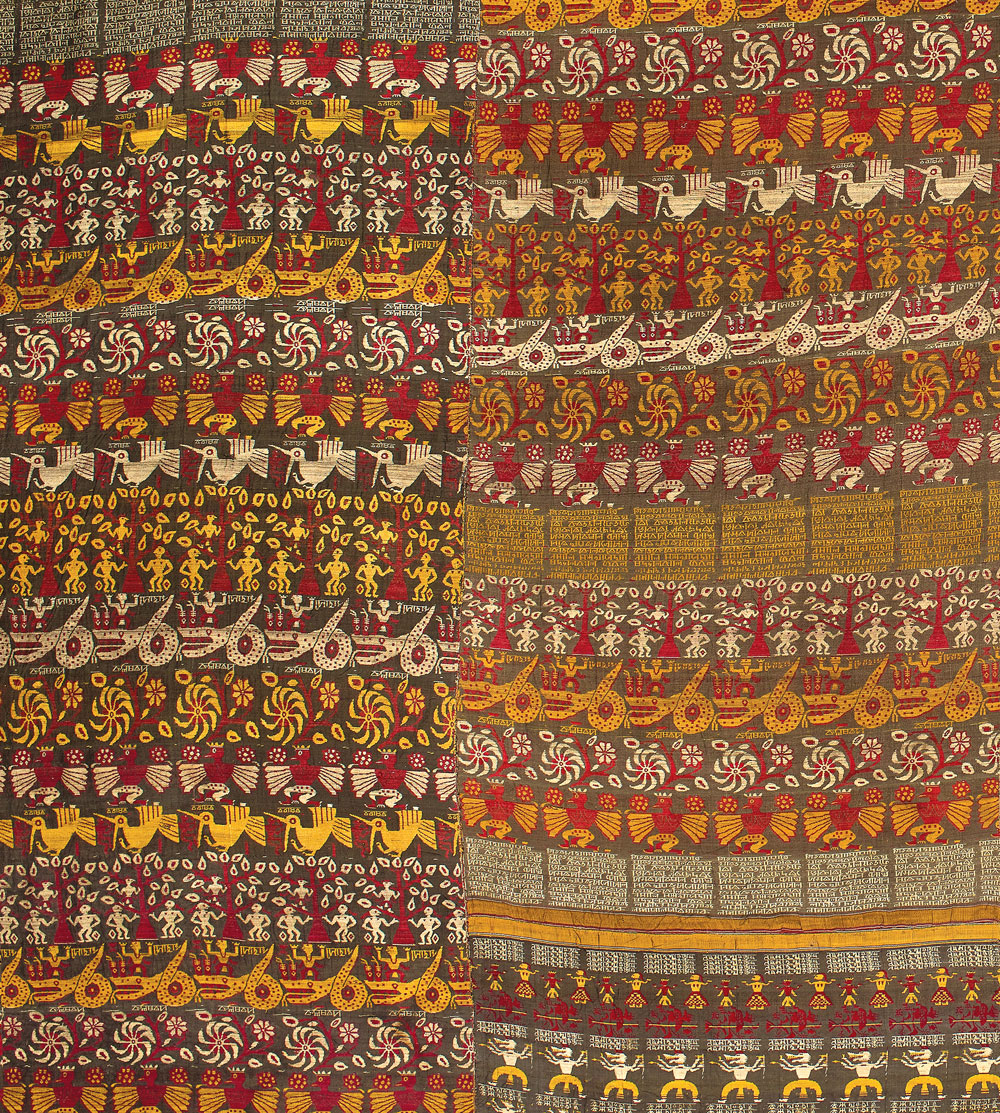
Vrindavani Vastra, Lampas textile from Assam, India

Lampas with griffins in roundels, from Islamic Spain

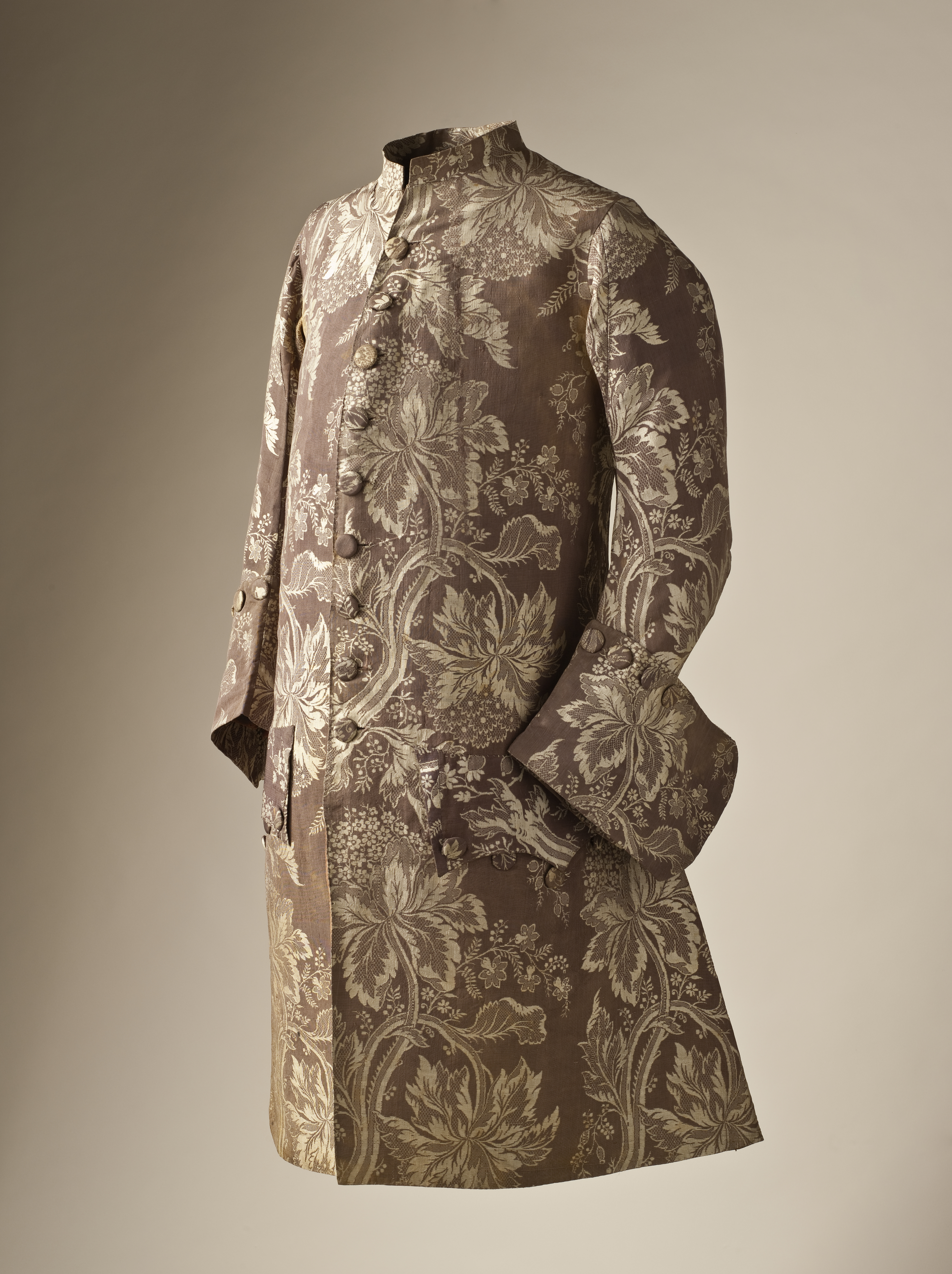
Man's coat, France, 1745–1750. Silk plain weave with supplementary weft patterning bound in plain weave (lampas). LACMA M.2007.211.795

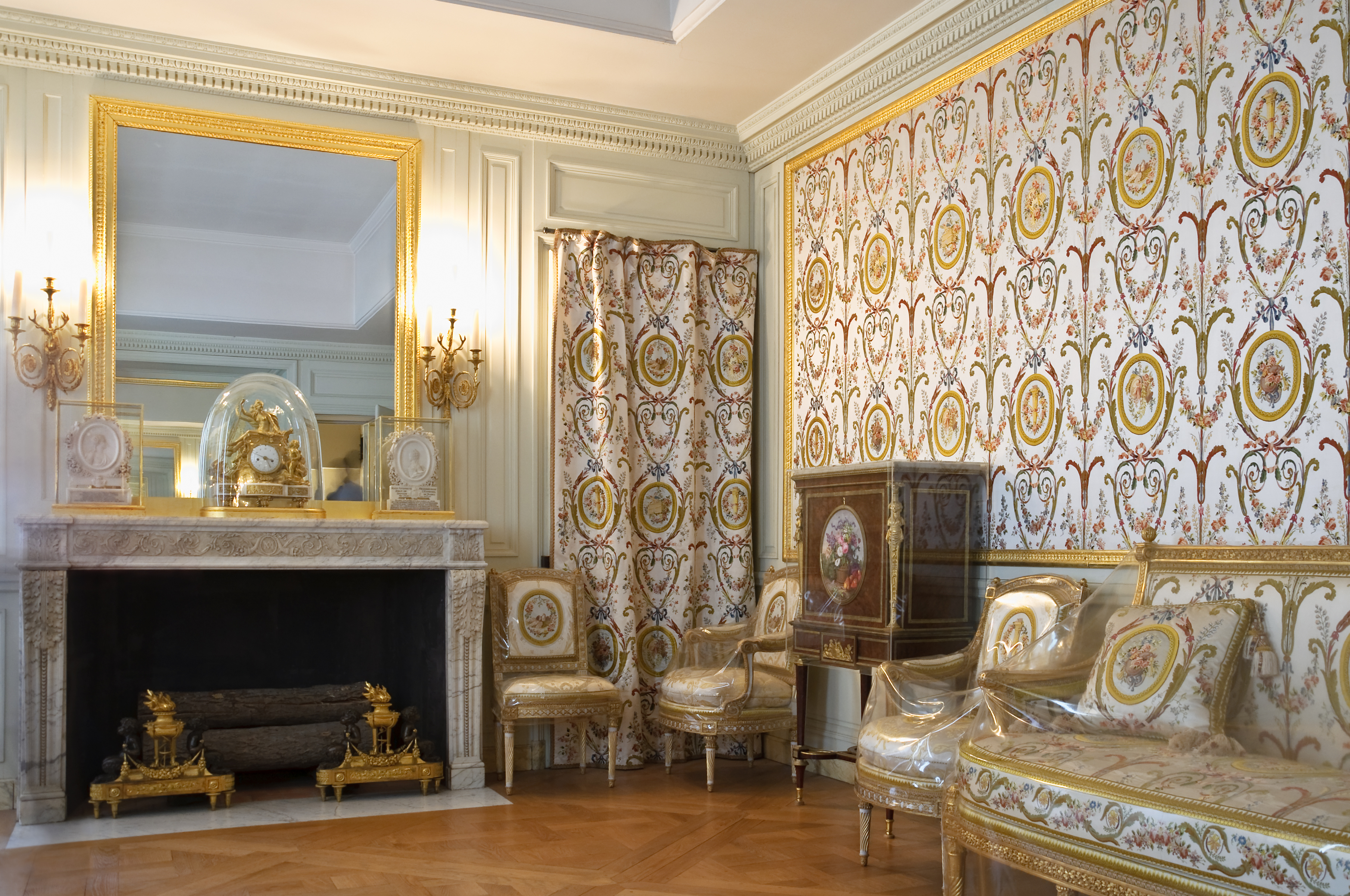
Lampas brocaded with silk and chenille, rewoven for the billiard room of the petit appartement of Marie-Antoinette at Versailles

Lampas weave textile from Italy
