= Pierre-Antoine Bellangé =

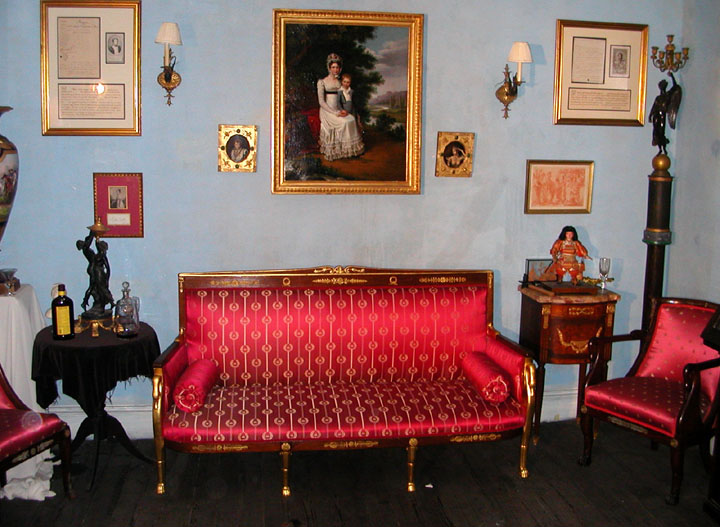
Bellange Furniture at the Williamsburg Art & Historical Center

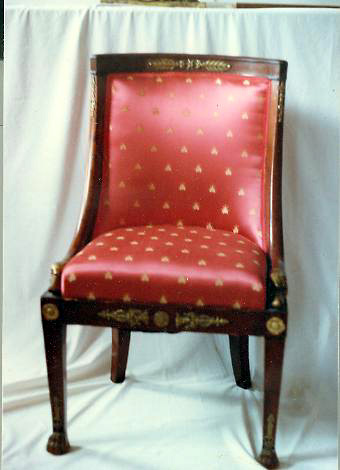
Bellangé sidechair at the Williamsburg Art & Historical Center

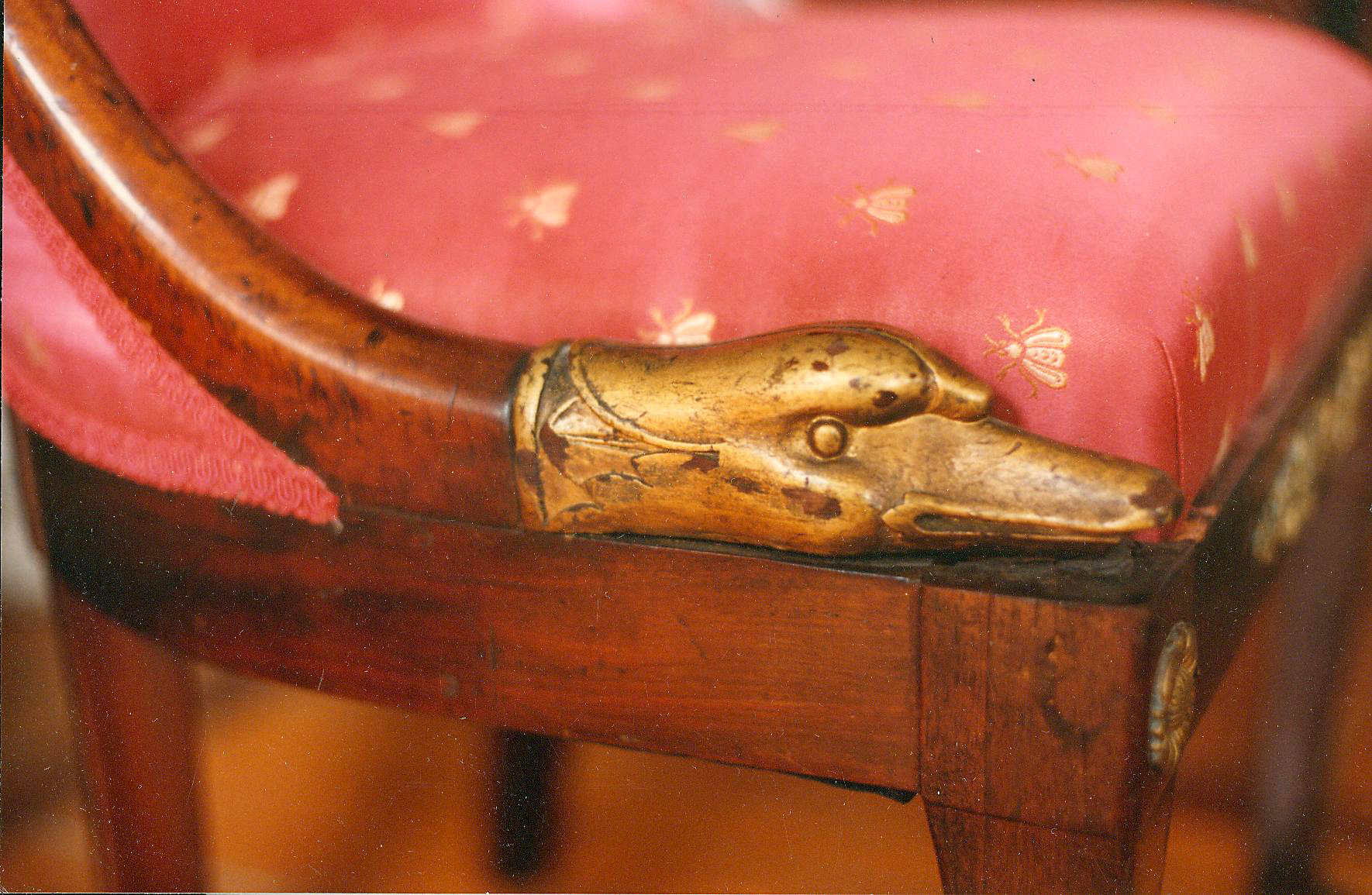
Swan motif in a Bellangé sidechair

Pierre-Antoine Bellangé (1757–1827) was a French ébéniste (cabinetmaker) working in Paris. Bellangé held an eminent position among the representatives of the decorative arts at the beginning of the nineteenth century. He gained his master craftsman title on October 24, 1788. Among his work from this time were four chairs in mahogany described as being "of the Gothic type" that he created for Count Esterhazy.

Bellangé was designated several times as arbitrator or expert in trials brought before the tribunal of commerce. At the end of 1811, he became the "Imperial Furniture Warehouse." Suites of furniture by Bellangé were provided for many European courts including the Netherlands, Sweden, and Denmark. Bellange's work is often classified as Empire style a reference to the First French Empire under Napoleon I. Motifs included swans favored by Napoleon's first wife Joséphine de Beauharnais, honeybees (a symbol for Napoleon), laurel branches, laurel wreaths, and Roman eagles. Bellangé's furniture often showcases the dense grain of mahogany, combined with gilded bronze or carved and gilded relief decoration. His highest style court furniture was built of gilded beech and upholstered in silk lampas fabrics in saturated colors, often with a gold jacquard pattern of medallions, eagles, or the arms of the court or family the piece was manufactured for.

In 1817 President James Monroe purchased a suite of furniture for the White House, which was made famous in Jacqueline Kennedy's TV tour of the White House. The furniture is in the Blue Room. He also produced furniture for Napoleon at the Château de Saint-Cloud, for the Tuileries Palace, Joséphine's Château de Malmaison, and also for his brother Joseph Bonaparte. Examples of his work can be seen at Windsor Castle and Buckingham Palace in England. The set of furniture, property of the Yuko Nii Foundation, in the Treasure Room of the Williamsburg Art & Historical Center in Williamsburg, Brooklyn, is of the period when Napoleon was emperor, around 1810, and has the swan motif favored by Joséphine, his first wife. It is entirely possible that this set was made for one of Napoleon's or Joséphine's rooms.

Bellangé kept the same functions under the reign of Louis XVIII, during which he furnished the Saint-Ouen pavilion. He was assigned by Charles X to the Director General of the Royal Furnitur. His son Louis-Alexandre (1796-1861) was appointed by Louis Philippe I "Cabinet Maker to the King".

== Sources ==
- Cordier, Sylvain (September 2009). "La famille Bellangé, ébénistes à Paris de la Révolution au Second Empire" (PDF). Institut National d'Histoire de l'Art (in French).
