= Stéphane Boudin =

French interior designer (1888–1967)

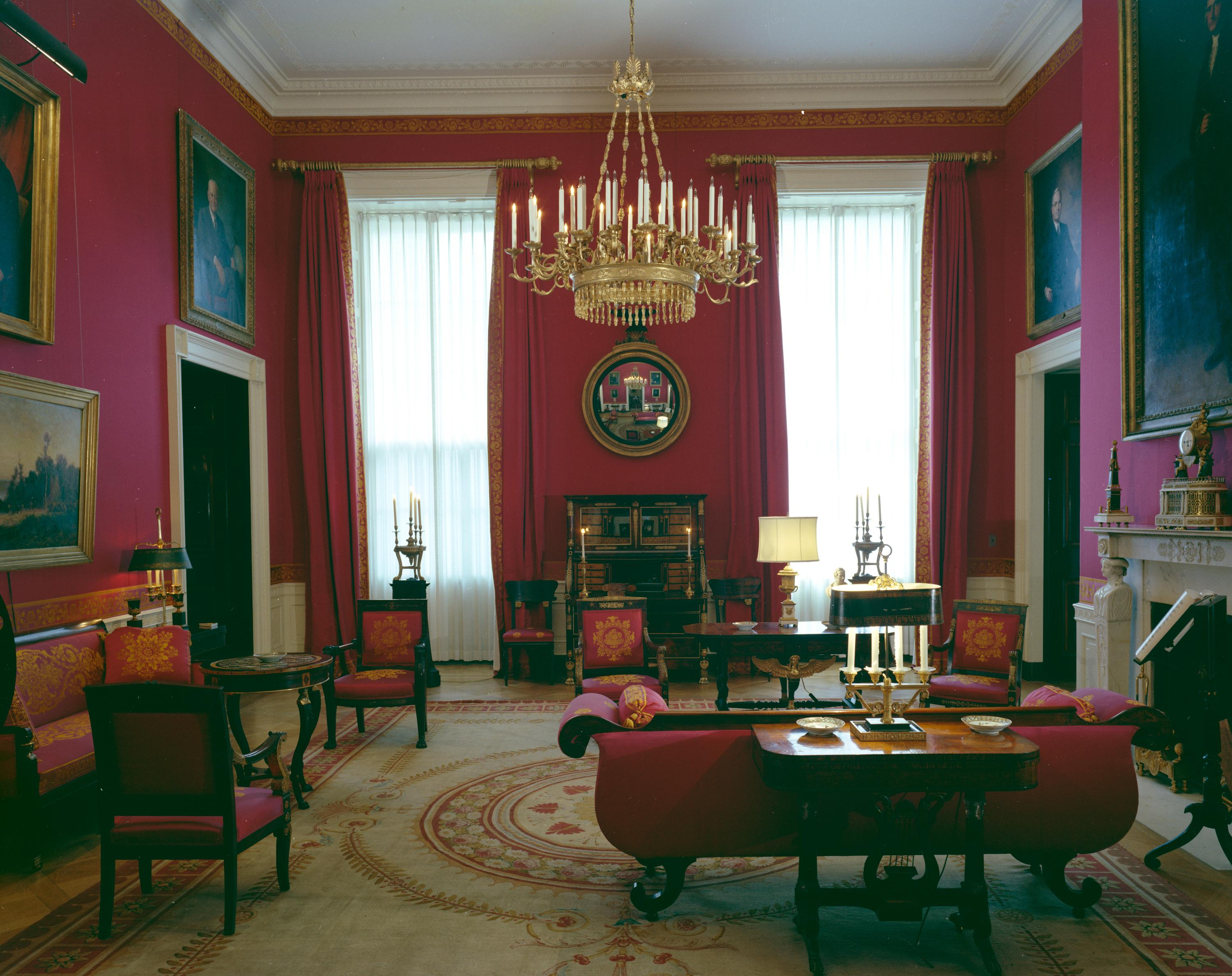
The Red Room of the White House, designed by Boudin.

Stéphane Boudin (28 October 1888 – 18 October 1967) was a French interior designer and a president of Maison Jansen, the influential Paris-based interior decorating firm.

== Biography ==
His father was a passementerie manufacturer.

Boudin is best known for being asked by U.S. first lady Jacqueline Kennedy to join American antiques expert Henry Francis du Pont of the Winterthur Museum and interior designer Sister Parish in the renovation and restoration of the White House from 1961 to 1963. After Boudin impressed the first lady with his initial work in the Red and Blue rooms, Mrs. Kennedy gave him increasing control of the redecoration project, to the consternation of du Pont and Parish.

Boudin was introduced to Mrs. Kennedy through Jayne Wrightsman, after his work on the Wrightsman's house, Blythedunes, in Palm Beach, Florida.

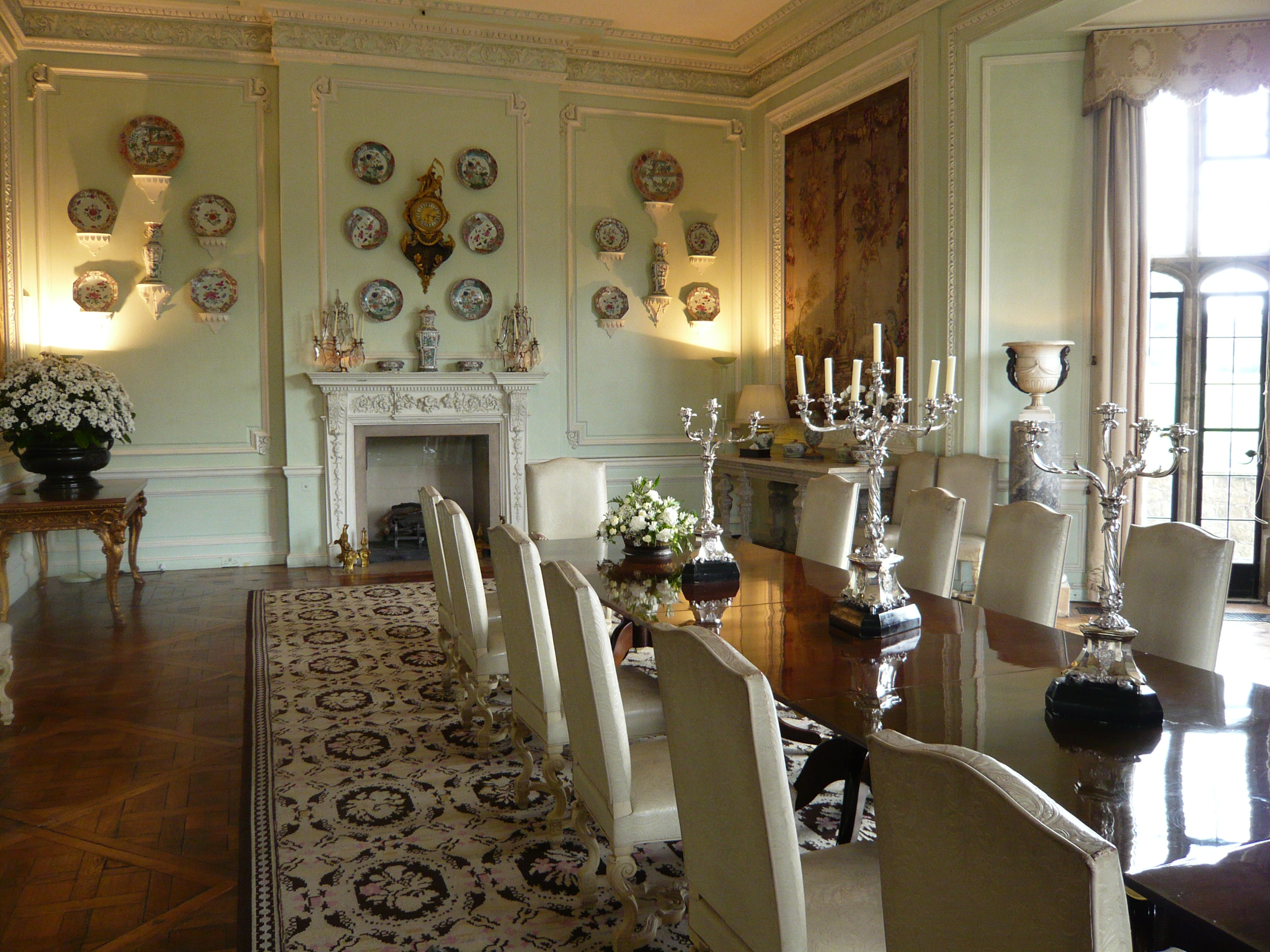
The Dining Room at Leeds Castle, designed by Boudin for Lady Baillie c. 1935.

Jansen is known for designing interiors for the royal families of Yugoslavia, Belgium and Iran, the German Reichsbank during the period of National Socialism, and Leeds Castle in Kent for its last owner, Olive, Lady Baillie.

For Henry Channon, Boudin designed in 1934 a rococo fantasy-style room. For Elsie de Wolfe, he designed a party pavilion, her Paris house, her country house and another house in the Bois de Boulogne.

Boudin also decorated Les Ormes (The Elms) the Washington, D.C. home of Perle Mesta, the U.S. ambassador to Luxembourg, and her sister, Marguerite Tyson; the house and its furnishings eventually were purchased by Lyndon B. Johnson. The Johnsons hired Genevieve Hendricks to integrate a touch of Texas into the Boudin decor because, as Time quoted Johnson as saying, "Every time somebody calls it a château, I lose 50,000 votes back in Texas."

== Bibliography ==
- Abbott, James Archer. Jansen Furniture. Acanathus Press: 2007. ISBN 978-0-926494-45-9.
- Abbott, James Archer. Jansen. Acanthus Press: 2006. ISBN 0-926494-33-3.
- Abbott James A., and Elaine M. Rice. Designing Camelot: The Kennedy White House Restoration. Van Nostrand Reinhold: 1998. ISBN 0-442-02532-7.
- Abbott, James A. A Frenchman in Camelot: The Decoration of the Kennedy White House by Stéphane Boudin. Boscobel Restoration Inc.: 1995. ISBN 0-9646659-0-5.
- Hampton, Mark. Legendary Decorators of the Twentieth Century. Doubleday: 1992. ISBN 978-0-385-26361-0.
- West, J.B. with Mary Lynn Kotz. Upstairs at the White House: My Life with the First Ladies. Coward, McCann & Geoghegan: 1973. SBN 698-10546-X.
