= East Room =

Event and reception room in the Executive Residence

Coordinates: 38°53′52″N 77°02′11″W

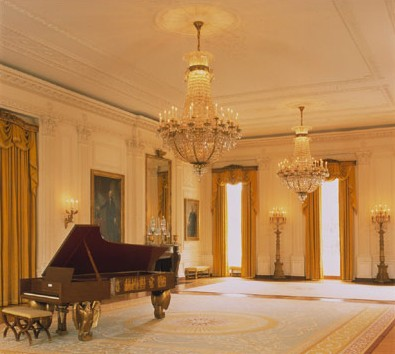
The East Room after the placement of carpets in 1995

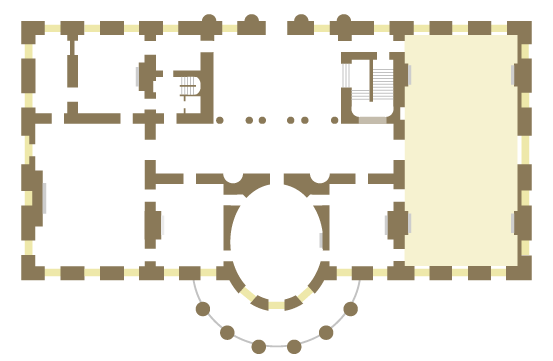
White House State Floor showing the location of the East Room

The East Room is an event and reception room in the Executive Residence of the White House complex, the home of the president of the United States. The East Room is the largest room in the Executive Residence; it is used for dances, receptions, press conferences, ceremonies, concerts, and banquets. The East Room was one of the last rooms to be finished and decorated, and it has undergone substantial redecoration over the past two centuries. Since 1964, the Committee for the Preservation of the White House has, by executive order, advised the president of the United States and first lady on the decor, preservation, and conservation of the East Room and other public rooms at the White House.

== Construction and early decoration ==
The White House was designed by architect James Hoban. Leinster House in Ireland was the main inspiration for the White House, and includes a large east room which may have inspired Hoban's East Room. But the newly added Large Dining Room at Mount Vernon may also have been a source for the design of the East Room. As his drawings of the second and third floor do not exist, it is unclear what use Hoban intended for the room. It is possible that Hoban intended it for use as a private gallery for the family. It was the largest room in the White House, however, about 80 by 37 feet (24 by 11 m) in size with a 22-foot-high (6.7 m) ceiling. The middle window in the north wall was designed to provide access to a terrace (never built).

The East Room was first assigned a purpose in 1807. Architect Benjamin Henry Latrobe had been brought to the capital by Thomas Jefferson, who made him commissioner of public buildings. Latrobe surveyed the White House in 1803, and architectural drawings of the building (produced in 1807) are the earliest extant plans now known. On his sketches, Latrobe comments "Public Audience chamber entirely unfinished, the ceiling has given way." Latrobe also proposed sealing the windows on the east side of the room based on an architectural theory about natural light. But this change was not made.

=== Early furnishings ===
The East Room was among the last rooms on the State Floor to be completed and used. The White House was unfinished when President John Adams occupied it between 1800 and 1801. His wife, Abigail Adams, hung laundry in the bare East Room to dry. Although much of the White House was finished and decorated during the Adams administration, the East Room was not. The room's lone artwork was a copy of the Lansdowne Portrait depicting George Washington, painted by Gilbert Stuart in 1797. It was purchased by the White House in 1800, and hung in the East Room. (Rescued from the 1814 fire, it still hangs there, with a companion portrait of Martha Washington painted by Eliphalet Frazer Andrews in 1878.) There was extensive feeling in Congress that Adams had adopted too many of the trappings of monarchy, and Congress declined to appropriate funds to finish the room for fear it would look too much like a throne room. During the Jefferson administration, 38 gold-and-black painted chairs were purchased and placed in the room, but little else is known of the room's furnishings prior to 1814. Jefferson also had the East Room partitioned (using canvas and sailcloth for walls) and the southern end used for a bedroom and office for Meriwether Lewis and Lewis Harvie (both Private Secretary to the President).

Jefferson's successor, James Madison, sought to make the partitions permanent and asked Latrobe to design bedrooms and office space across the southern part of the room. But these changes were not made, either. Madison did use a portion of the East Room, however, for Cabinet meetings.

=== Post-fire restoration and furnishings ===
The East Room, along with the rest of the White House, was burned in 1814 during the Burning of Washington in the War of 1812. The interior was gutted, although most of the exterior sandstone walls remained standing. The north facade of the White House was the most damaged. But because the East Room had so little furniture in it, the section of the north facade fronting the East Room was the least damaged. Latrobe helped to reconstruct the White House. In 1814 and 1815, the rebuilt East Room received new door frames and inlaid mahogany doors that remain in the room today. New plaster work in the form of a gilded cornice-line frieze of anthemion (a flowerlike, traditional Greek decorative pattern) was installed, and the walls plastered (and left unpainted) as well.

Federal style furniture, made by Georgetown craftsman William King Jr., was added to the East Room by President James Monroe in 1818. (First Lady Elizabeth Monroe's involvement was limited to choosing drapery fabric for the room). King produced 24 armchairs and four sofas, all made of mahogany. The total cost was $1,408. The furniture was not upholstered, and sat along the walls largely unused. In 1829, the first year of the Jackson administration, the King furniture was finally upholstered in blue damask silk. Monroe also purchased (for $80) a marble bust of George Washington by the Italian sculptor Giuseppe Ceracchi, which remained in the East Room probably until the Kennedy redecoration in 1962 (when it was moved to the Blue Room). Monroe also purchased in 1817 for the fireplace mantels four gilt bronze candelabra, designed and manufactured by the French bronze maker Pierre-Philippe Thomire.

By 1825, the room contained 24 unfinished mahogany armchairs, four large unfinished mahogany sofas, eight tables made of pine, a door screen, a paper partition, a three-shelf bookshelf, a mahogany map stand, a washstand (with basin and ewer), and a clothes press. But for the most part, from 1818 to 1829 the East Room was unused. Occasionally it was cleared and used for dances, but usually its doors were locked and it served as storage space. A widely reported story claims that for two months in the summer of 1825, the East Room housed at least one live alligator that belonged to the visiting Marquis de Lafayette, (Note: In July 1824, Lafayette embarked on a grand tour of the United States during which he acquired several tons of items gifted to him. These items were stored in the East Room for two months during his final destination of the tour, Washington D.C. Purportedly, one or more alligators were included. E.g: in 1963, the article "The Creation of the President's House" in the journal Records of the Columbia Historical Society, Washington, D.C. – After relating Abigail Adam's comments regarding the disarray in the East Room, the author adds: "This room was also used to quarter the pet alligator presented to Lafayette on the latter's triumphal tour of 1824.") but a lack of contemporary evidence suggests that the story might be apocryphal. In 1826 Congress appropriated $6,000 to finally finish the room, although the funds were not made available until 1827. President John Quincy Adams used the money to repair the White House rather than finish the room.

=== 1829 completion under Jackson ===
The East Room was finally completed and decorated in 1829 by Andrew Jackson. New plaster work in the form of a cornice-line frieze of anthemion (a flowerlike, traditional Greek decorative pattern) was installed, three Neoclassical plasterwork medallions affixed to the ceiling, and the demi-lune over the east wall's Venetian window removed and turned into a wall. Decorative wooden beams were added to the ceiling, and two of the east-facing windows were blocked off and fireplaces with black Italian marble mantelpieces installed in their place. The Jackson administration turned to French-born American importer Louis Véron of Philadelphia for assistance in furnishing the executive mansion. Véron was one of the first merchants to display items from a wide range of suppliers in a showroom, rather than manufacture the items himself. Nearly all the 1829 furnishings for the East Room were supplied by Véron. Véron also added gilt rays and stars over the west door (the one the president usually used when entering the room).

The bare walls were covered with yellow wallpaper with cloth edging, light-blue moreen drapes were added to the windows, (Note: Moreen is a heavy wool or wool/cotton blend fabric with a heavy weft that creates a ribbed face. It has a moiré pattern finish, and was commonly used for curtains or drapes.) and plaster cornices adorned with eagles were installed over the windows. Véron covered the floor with a red-bordered blue, fawn, and yellow 500-square-foot (46 m^{2}) carpet woven in Brussels. The 1818 Monroe furniture was upholstered, three large mahogany tables topped with marble, and four white marble-topped pier tables placed in the room. (Note: The pier table is a long, narrow table designed to be placed against a wall. It has four legs, so it may stand upright on its own. Generally, they were finely carved and designed to stand between two windows or two doors. Pier tables often were sold with a "pier glass"—a mirror in a frame which matched the carving of the pier table.) (Note: One of the Quervelle pier tables survives, and is known in the 21st century as the Andrew Jackson Table. All three large marble-topped tables also remain.) For lighting, Véron provided several astral and mantel lamps. (Note: Astral lamps were expensive oil lamps made with a marble base, brass body, and crystal shade. The oil reservoir was in a ring around the lamp, rather than directly beneath it, so that there was little shadow cast by the lamp. Mantel lamps were narrow lamps with a tall glass shade designed to sit on a shelf or mantelpiece. They sometimes had a shade on the rear, to reflect light outward rather than against the wall.) Gilded bronze wall brackets for hanging lamps and candles were attached to the walls, and mirrors in gilt frames placed over the fireplace mantels.

Jackson also purchased three cut-glass chandeliers to light the room. Each chandelier, which featured 18 whale oil lamps, hung from the ceiling medallions and were complemented with whale oil wall sconces and table lamps. (Note: The manufacturer of the 1829 chandeliers is not known.) There were also 20 spittoons. His expenditures totaled $9,358.27, provided by a friendly Congress eager to make the White House a more elegant symbol of the nation. (Note: The carpet cost $1,058.25, and the spittons $12.50 each.)

The East Room's original 18-lamp chandeliers were removed by Jackson in 1834 and placed in the State and Family Dining Rooms. Véron supplied the East Room with a more luxurious set.

== Mid to late 19th century refurbishments ==
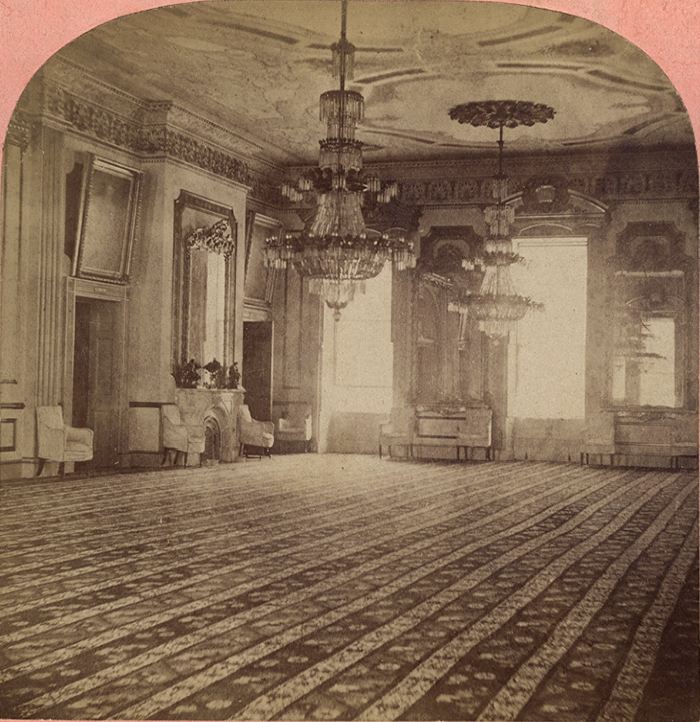
The East Room in a stereograph made during the administration of President Andrew Johnson, showing the Lincoln redecorations

Furniture upholstered in light blue, light blue curtains, and imported French silver wallpaper with a gold border were added to the East Room by the Martin Van Buren administration in 1839. At some point prior to the inauguration of President William Henry Harrison in March 1841, the East Room acquired eight floor-to-ceiling mirrors with broad, heavily carved frames. President James K. Polk had the White House plumbed for gas heating and lighting in 1848. Cornelius & Company of Philadelphia retrofitted the 1834 chandeliers for gas, and Polk himself watched their first lighting. By the end of the Polk administration in January 1849, the East Room was adorned with three chandeliers, three "pier glasses" (mirrors), red damask window drapes, white muslin window curtains, four new sofas, 24 new chairs, three large tables (placed in the center of the room), four pier tables with marble tops, a large carpet, four new hearthrugs, four fire fenders, four large candelabra, eight small candelabra, eight mantle ornaments, and a bust of George Washington. (Note: The 1818 Monroe furniture had, likely, been auctioned off. The White House repurchased a single Monroe chair during the Kennedy administration. Two more chairs were donated to the White House during the Reagan administration. The only known surviving sofa from this set was donated to the White House in 1979, and installed in the Blue Room.)

New draperies, lace curtains, and a carpet were added by Jane Pierce, wife of President Franklin Pierce, in 1853. The Pierces also had the over-mantel mirrors and pier mirrors reframed by L. R. Menger of New York.

=== 1861 Lincoln refurbishment ===
Despite this redecoration, the East Room was nonetheless somewhat shabby by 1861. On April 18, 1861, about 60 militiamen from Kansas took up temporary residence in the East Room pending construction of barracks for them in the city. They did serious damage to the carpet, and sometimes shot bullets into the walls. Mary Todd Lincoln refurbished the room with damask drapes, lace curtains, wallpaper, and a new $2,500 carpet later that year. The wallpaper was heavy patterned velvet cloth paper from Paris in crimson, garnet, and gold, and supplied by William H. Carryl & Brother of New York. The floor covering was a carpet woven in Glasgow, Scotland. The largest loom in the world was needed to weave the carpet, which covered the entire floor. The drapes were crimson with heavy gold fringe and numerous gold tassels, while the lace curtains behind them were imported from Switzerland.

The East Room under the Lincolns remained sparsely furnished, however, as befit a reception hall. The three chandeliers, which dated from the Jackson administration, were cleaned and reinstalled. They were so brilliant that the press assumed they were new. Mrs. Lincoln left the three large mahogany tables with black and gold marble inlays, which had long occupied the room, below each chandelier.

Two funerals for Lincoln Family members were held in the East Room in the 1860s. The first was that of 11-year-old Willie Lincoln, President Abraham Lincoln's son, who died of typhoid fever on February 21, 1862. Just over three years later, Lincoln's body lay in state in the East Room as well, and his funeral was held there on April 19.

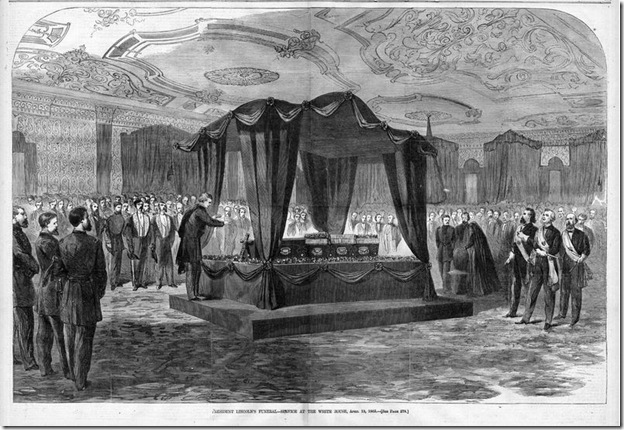
Lincoln funeral in the East Room (Harper's Weekly, May 6, 1865)

At the time of Lincoln's death in 1865, the East Room contained 24 chairs, four sofas, four tables, eight sets of drapes, eight sets of lace curtains, eight mirrors, and one carpet. All the furniture was in poor shape. During his administration, members of the public attending the weekly receptions in the room had heavily vandalized the room in seeking souvenirs, ripping down portions of the wallpaper and stealing cords and tassels from the drapes. Someone even cut a square yard from one of the damask drapes. Others took scissors and knives to the carpet, gouging the oak floor beneath, and gilded ornaments were stolen from the mantels.

President Andrew Johnson had the public rooms on the State Floor refurbished in 1866. His wife, Eliza McCardle Johnson, was in frail health and did little in the way of entertaining or overseeing the White House. Johnson instead relied on his daughter, Martha Patterson (wife of Senator David T. Patterson). In May, the East Room was cleared of furnishings. Mrs. Patterson oversaw the selection of new yellow wallpaper with a black and gold border, lace curtains, and reupholstered furniture. The ceiling was repainted and frescoes added, and the ceiling centerpieces and cornices were regilded. Only once did Mrs. Johnson intervene, and that was to request that the paint applied to ceiling be of the highest quality. Patterson also had the three large marble-topped tables removed from the East Room and placed in the family private quarters, and two of the four pier tables added to the Family Dining Room. The East Room was finished in early 1867.

=== 1873 Grant refurbishment ===
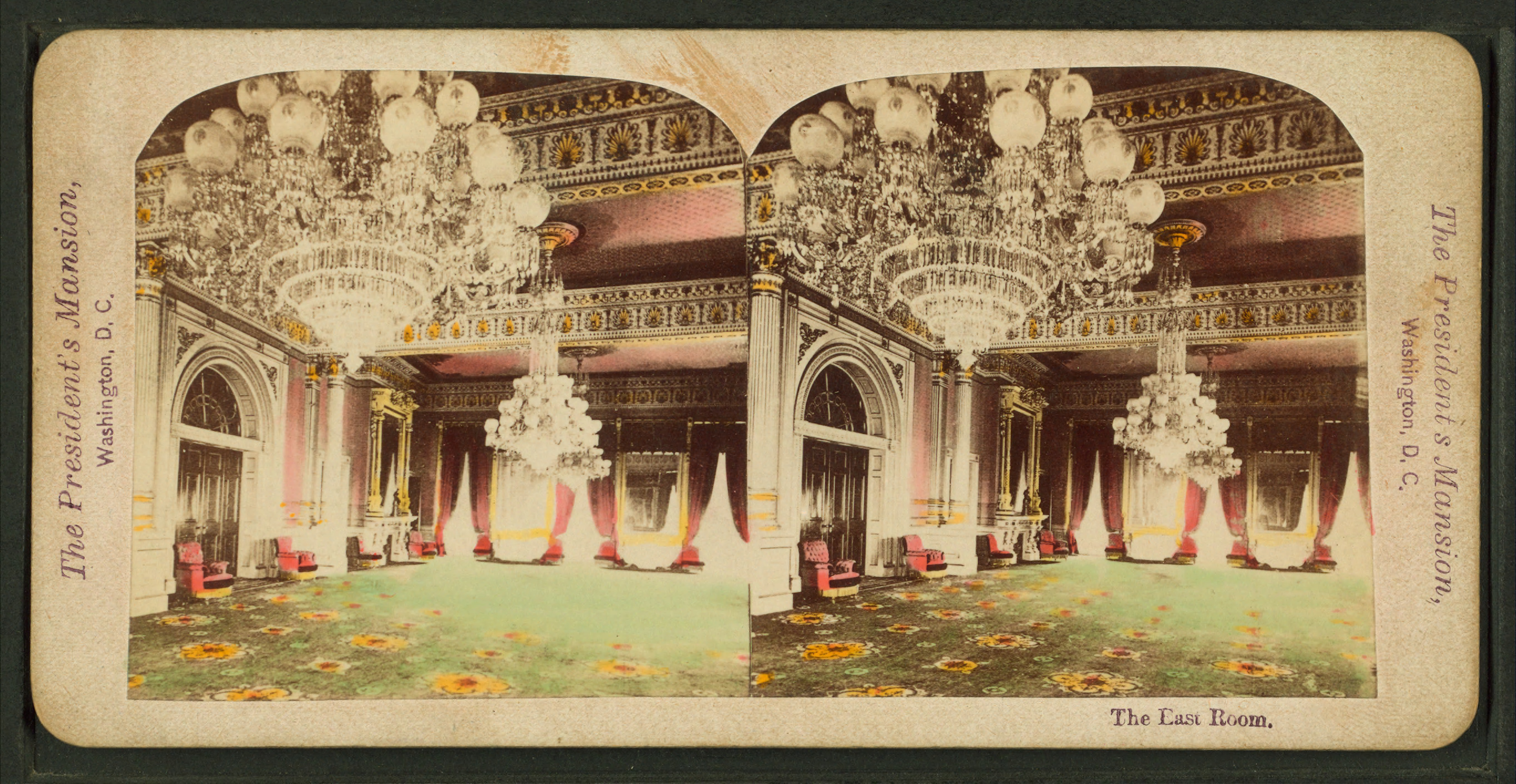
Stereoscope of the East Room as of the late 19th century

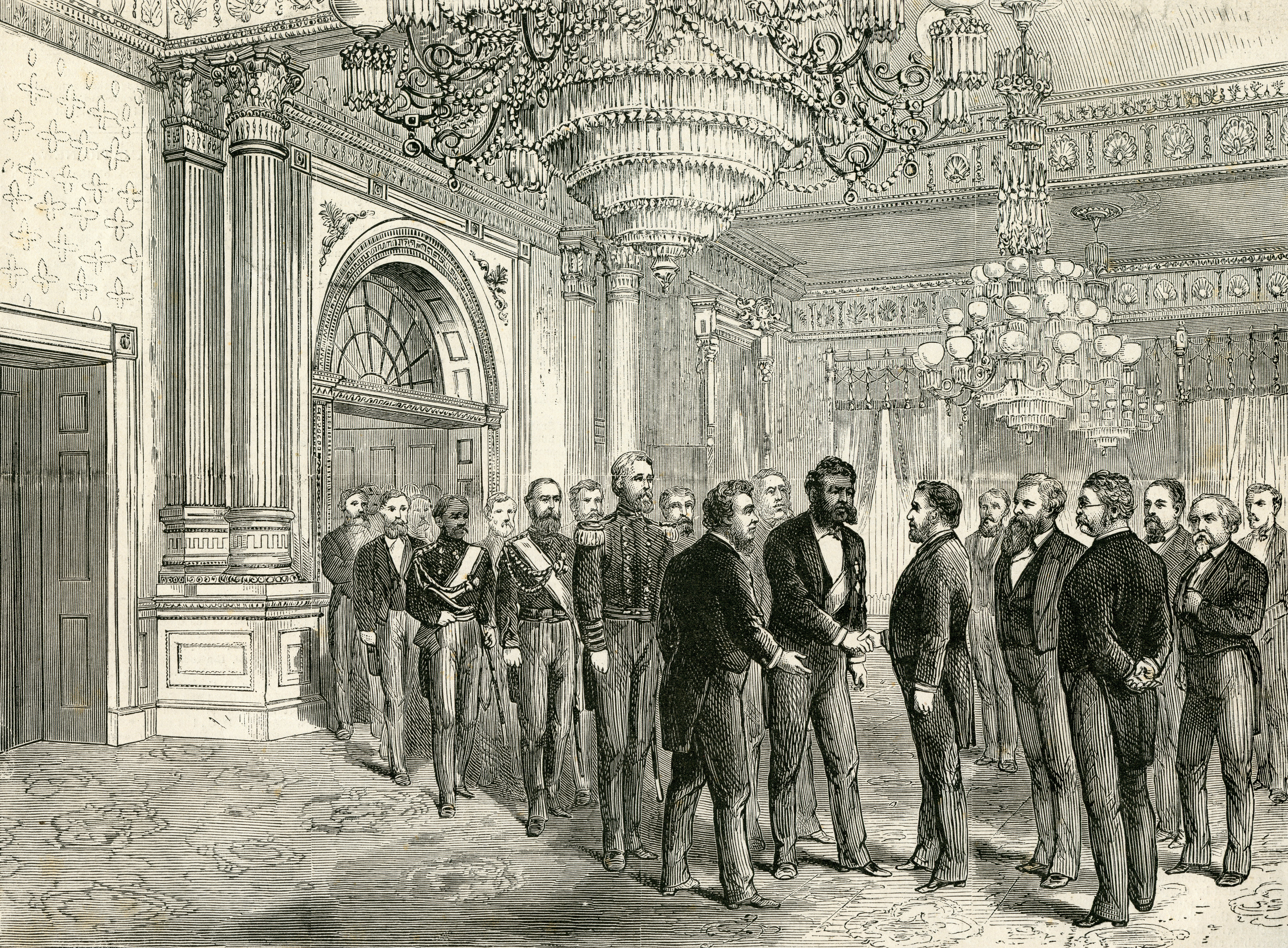
President Grant formally receives King Kalākaua of Hawaii in the East Room, December 1874

The East Room was radically redecorated in 1873 during the administration of Ulysses S. Grant. Architects Orville Babcock (Commissioner of Public Buildings and Grounds), Richard Ezdorf, William J. McPherson, and Alfred Mullett were faced with both a decorative and structural task. The heavy walls above the East Room as well as inadequate structural support had caused the ceiling to sag appreciably. Furthermore, the Grants wanted to renovate the East Room into a far more modern space reflective of their Midwest tastes. The architects added new load-bearing beams across the ceiling, which made the room appear to be more intimate in sectional spaces. Corinthian columns were added to support these beams. To integrate the beams into the room, they extended the 1815 frieze decoratively across the beams. The ceiling, divided into three sections by the beams, was refrescoed as well. Elaborately carved new fireplaces painted in white and gold replaced the simpler 1829 fireplaces. To help integrate the load-bearing columns into the room, white and gold painted pilasters were added to the room. White-painted carved paneling with Greek Revival designs; massive, low-hanging, cut-glass chandeliers (replacing those which had hung since 1834); pearl gray and gilt wallpaper, and wall-to-wall carpeting in a floral pattern completed the redecoration. Much of the furniture in the room was sold at public auction (a common and unremarkable practice until the 20th century). (Note: The last public sales of White House goods took place in 1905 and 1907, after the Theodore Roosevelt administration's renovations.) (Note: Three chairs were later repurchased by the White House. The Smithsonian Institution has one of the sofas, and other chairs are in private collections.) The architects called the style "Pure Greek", and architectural historian Patrick Phillips-Schrock called it "sumptuous", but it was widely derided as "Steamboat Gothic". Nellie Grant's lavish wedding took place in the East Room on May 21, 1874.

=== Late 19th century changes ===
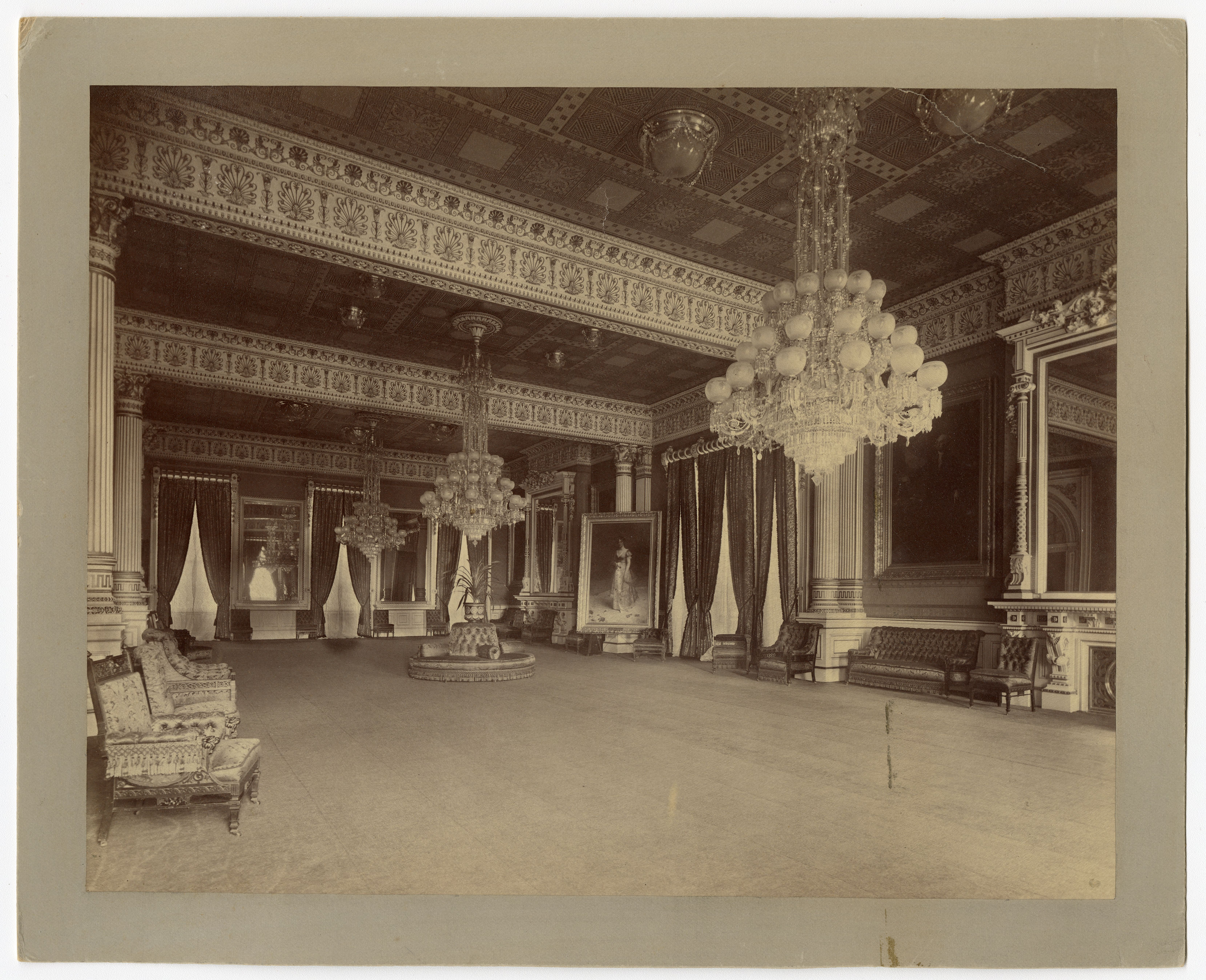
East Room in the White House during Harrison Administration.

President Chester A. Arthur hired the Washington, D.C., firm of W. B. Moses & Son to redecorate much of the White House in 1881, including the East Room. Moses & Son added new window curtains and drapes, and a suite of ebony furniture carved in a Japanese style. This suite included sofas, arm chairs, side chairs, and corner chairs. Arthur then auctioned off an immense quantity of older White House furnishings in April 1882, including some amount of undescribed older furniture from the East Room. Desiring an even grander approach to the public rooms, Arthur hired Tiffany & Co. in 1882 to redecorate the East Room yet again. Most of this work involved painting and regilding, however. No new furniture was ordered, and the over-mantel and pier mirrors reframed or regilded.

President Grover Cleveland made no changes to the East Room, although a divan upholstered in gold was added below the main chandelier. It was supplied by W. H. Houghton & Co. of Washington, D.C.

Cleveland's successor, Benjamin Harrison, refurbished most of the State Floor rooms again in 1891 after the White House was wired for electricity. W. H. Post & Co. of Hartford, Connecticut, did the work. The ceiling was repainted, the wallpaper replaced, and new silk damask curtains installed. The furniture in the East Room was reupholstered as well in a gold brocatelle (a brocade with the design in high relief). A new Axminster carpet, 515 square yards (431 m^{2}) in size, was also laid down. When Caroline Harrison died on October 25, 1892 (two weeks before the presidential election), her funeral was held in the East Room.

Two Sèvres vases (on marble pedestals) were added to the East Room in 1897. They were a gift of the government of France to mark the laying of the Franco-American transatlantic telegraph cable that year.

== 1902 Roosevelt restoration ==
McKim, Mead, and White renovation of the East Room shown in 1904. A robust Beaux Arts style replaced a series of Victorian interiors.

In 1902, President Theodore Roosevelt engaged the architectural firm of McKim, Meade & White to renovate and expand the White House. Their intention was three-fold: To modernize the White House, to establish a decorating motif that would never have to be altered, and to recreate the White House's early American interiors. Although this last guideline was followed in most rooms, it was not in the East Room. McKim, Meade & White drew their inspiration for the East Room from British and French manor house interiors of the 1790s. Nonetheless, the Colonial Revival style was more of an idealized than historically accurate aesthetic, and McKim, Mead & White's interiors reflected a tendency toward light-filled spaces and away from patterns and "busy" or cluttered spaces.

As the East Room had not been decorated until 1829, the architects took some liberties, devising a room based on the 1780 Louis XVI style salon de famille in the Château de Compiègne. For the walls, the designers chose pilasters carved by Herter Brothers of New York City, which appeared to support Neoclassical entablatures. There were 12 faux entablatures, each made of marble and depicting scenes from Aesop's Fables. They were designed by Leon Marcotte of L. Marcotte & Co. of New York, and carved by the Piccirilli Brothers of New York City. The rest of the walls were painted cream white, and adorned with gilded sconces (supplied by the lighting firm of Edward F. Caldwell & Co.) and gold wall hangings. McKim, Meade & White strongly disliked the East Room's four fireplaces, which divided the area into three spaces. The fireplaces and mantels, which projected about 2.5 feet (0.76 m), were considerably reduced in depth to just 0.5 feet (0.15 m). The mantels were replaced with 6-foot (1.8 m) new ones in the Georgian style. The marble for each mantel came from a different state, and each was a different color.

Marcotte & Co. also designed, manufactured, and installed gilded ceiling decorations. The central section of the ceiling was decorated with a large plaster panel featuring an intricate medallion flanked by swags, acanthus, escutcheons, and scrollwork. A border of acanthus, scrollwork, and egg-and-dart moldings bordered the section. On the narrow ends of the room were smaller sections, similarly decorated.

Hanging from the ceiling were three large Bohemian crystal chandeliers. These replaced the larger, out-of-style chandeliers placed there in 1873 during the Grant administration. (Note: One of the so-called "Grant chandeliers" installed in 1873 was purchased by Denver, Colorado, real estate developer Walter Scott Cheesman for his then-under construction mansion. The state of Colorado obtained title to the mansion in 1959, and uses it as the Colorado Governor's Mansion. Both Jacqueline Kennedy and Michelle Obama have asked the state of Colorado to return the chandelier, but the state has declined to do so.) The tent-and-bowl chandeliers were also provided by Caldwell & Co. but manufactured by Christoph Palme & Co. of Parchen, Bohemia, Austria-Hungary. Their design was copied from 18th century English and French chandeliers. Each chandelier weighed more than 1,200 pounds (540 kg), was 11 feet (3.4 m) high, and had 7,000 glass pieces. (Note: Three of the other 1873 chandeliers were given to the United States Capitol and reused there. One was later returned to the White House in 1963 and hung in the upstairs Treaty Room. It was returned to the Capitol in 1978.) Caldwell & Co. also designed four gilded bronze floor lamps in the Louis XVI style, and four 6-foot (1.8 m) floor candelabra in the Empire style with Egyptian Revival elements (such as winged lions).

The floor of the East Room was replaced with oak parquet, and trimmed in red Numidian marble from North Africa. (A box made from the old parquet floor was donated to the White House during the Jimmy Carter administration.)

In addition to the wall hangings, McKim, Meade & White commissioned a wide range of other furnishings more in line with their Louis XVI style salon de famille style. Marcotte and Co. supplied heavy velvet gold drapes, and topped each window with carved and gilded cornices of the company's own design. The existing pier tables were removed, and four richly carved and gilded Louis XVI Revival style console tables, also designed by Marcotte & Co., were placed between the pilasters. The existing seating was also removed, (Note: Some of the pre-1902 furniture in the East Room was relocated either to the basement offices or to the family quarters. Several of the immense mirrors, the pre-1902 mantels, and additional furniture were sold at auction, however—the last time any White House furnishings were sold at auction.) and Marcotte & Co. replaced it with 13 Louis XVI Revival gilded banquettes (upholstered benches). Marcotte & Co. also supplied new ornate gilded frames for each over-mantel mirror. A few items in the room were reused, however. These included the mantel candelabra, manufactured by Russell & LaFarge and purchased in the Monroe administration in 1817.

A personal inspection by Charles Follen McKim also found the East Room clearly sinking. The problem, not rectified until 1952, was that the interior walls rested on brick columns in the basement, which themselves were sitting on loose rubble footings atop soft soil. The columns were sinking into the soil under the mansion's weight. But forced by Roosevelt to finish the restoration as quickly as possible, McKim was unable to make any structural changes to solve the problem.

=== Post-1902 early 20th century changes ===
The East Room chandeliers were altered in 1903 to reduce their diameter slightly to 6 feet (1.8 m), leaving them with just 6,000 glass pieces. The renovated chandelier weight dropped to 1,200 pounds (540 kg). That same year, the Steinway & Sons piano company donated an ornate gilded grand piano to the White House. This piano (serial number 100,000) was placed in the East Room. During Roosevelt's term, the government of France donated Limoges porcelain busts of George Washington, Thomas Jefferson, Abraham Lincoln, and Benjamin Franklin to the White House. These were also placed in the East Room. (Note: As of the 21st century, the Washington and Franklin busts had been moved to flank the stairs leading from the basement to the main corridor. The Jefferson and Lincoln busts now flank the entrance to the Diplomatic Reception Room.)

Slight changes were made to the East Room during the Woodrow Wilson administration. Ellen Axson Wilson, the president's first wife, made almost no changes to the room. She died in 1914, just two years into Wilson's first term. Wilson remarried a year later, and the new First Lady, Edith Bolling Galt Wilson, had the 1902 drapes replaced.

In the early 1930s, First Lady Lou Henry Hoover purchased a number of gilt upholstered dining room chairs in something approaching an Art Deco style for use in the East Room.

President Franklin D. Roosevelt did little to either renovate or maintain the White House during his unusually long tenure. Roosevelt believed that the White House should "do its part" during the Great Depression and World War II, and economize by minimizing expenditures. First Lady Eleanor Roosevelt had little interest in redecorating, and little in the way of social engagements occurred during the war. One of the few revisions came in the East Room, where the Vollmer suite of furniture was moved from the Blue Room. (Note: The Vollmer suite was ordered by Harriet Lane in 1859 from Gottlieb Vollmer, a cabinet and furniture maker in Philadelphia. It was in the "high Imperial" style of Rococo Revival, with the upholstery in light blue brocatelle. The suite included four oval-back armchairs, four small side chairs, four small reception chairs, two ottomans, two large sofas, two small sofas, and a circular settee. The suite of furniture was delivered in December 1859.) Steinway & Sons donated a second grand piano to the White House in 1938. Steinway historians Miles Chapin and Rodica Prato call it the "best-known art-case Steinway" in the world. Architect Eric Gugler designed the 10.5-foot-long (3.2 m), mahogany case piano (serial number 300,000). The case is decorated with scenes depicting American music and dance, each gilded in gold leaf. The tableaux, designed by artist Dunbar Beck, depict people dancing the Virginia reel, chanting by Native Americans, cowboys singing during a cattle drive, a barn dance, and African American slaves singing in the fields. The legs of the piano feature gilded eagles, designed and carved by Albert Stewart. (Steinway & Sons completely refurbished the piano in 1992.) Eleanor Roosevelt also changed the draperies in the East Room from gold to crimson.

== 1952 Truman restoration ==
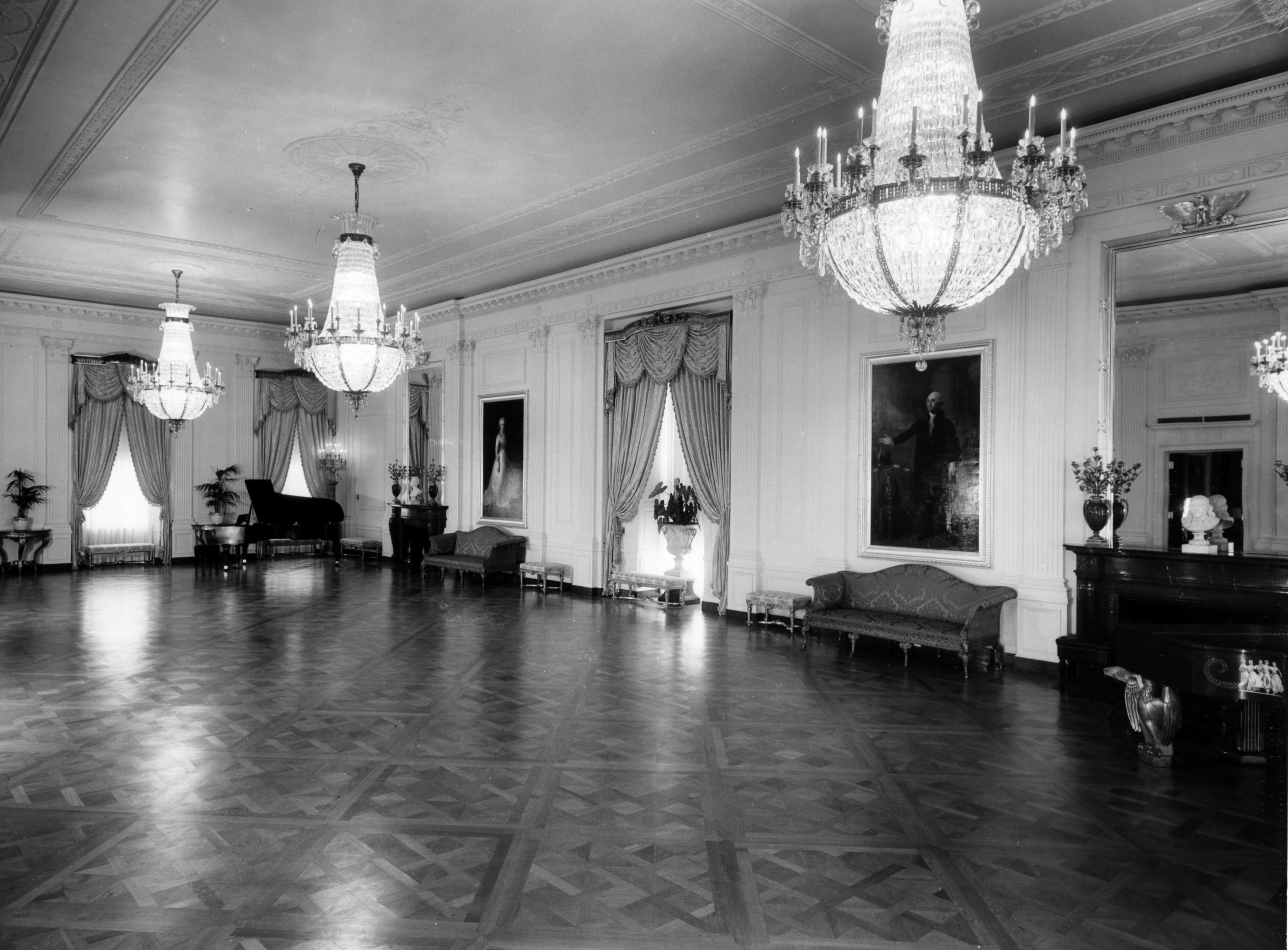
The East Room after its 1949–1952 restoration was completed

By the late 1940s, the East Room—along with the rest of the White House—was in such poor shape that its structural integrity was at risk. President Harry S. Truman was attending a concert in the East Room on February 11, 1947, when he was informed that the ceiling of the room was being pulled down by the weight of the chandeliers. The following day, the chandeliers were taken down. On October 26, 1948, plaster fell from the ceiling of the East Room, exposing a 12-foot-long (3.7 m) crack in the ceiling. Engineers discovered that the ceiling had also dropped by 0.5 feet (0.15 m). The East Room was cleared of all furniture, and floor-to-ceiling X-shaped wooden braces erected in the room to stabilize it. The room was then sealed off. Engineers with the Public Building Administration and White House staff feared the entire building could collapse. President and Mrs. Truman left the White House on September 27, 1948, for a 45-day nationwide political barnstorming tour. When they returned to the White House on November 5, they were immediately informed that the White House had to be evacuated. The White House was closed to the public on November 7, and after a two-week vacation in Key West, Florida, the Trumans moved into Blair House on November 21, 1948.

During the Truman White House reconstruction that began in 1949, the East Room was found to be in very poor condition. Previous renovations had seriously damaged the interior walls. In one 24-foot-long (7.3 m) section of wall, no fewer than five doors had been cut through the masonry, severely weakening it. Paneling, windows, and furnishings were dismantled, numbered, and stored. Although great care was taken in removing the plasterwork, there was no way to avoid cracking it during removal. Molds were made from the originals, and new plasterwork installed. Even so, architect Lorenzo Winslow simplified many of the designs before they were cast, allegedly to make them look less Renaissance Revival and more "American". Less care was taken in removing the woodwork, some of which was damaged when pried loose. Other pieces were too brittle to be reused, and what could be reused had to be restored (often by removing many layers of paint). But by late 1951, with the White House renovation months behind, costs soaring, and President Truman demanding that the work be sped up, workers found it easier to machine new pieces than restore old wood. All of the paneling for the East Room was condemned as unfit for reuse, whether it was actually unusable or not, and replaced with new wood. (Although some of the East Room woodwork would be chopped up for souvenirs, most of it was used as landfill at Fort Myer in Arlington County, Virginia.) The new panelling was also simpler and had considerably less presence, and was covered in a somewhat lighter color than the 1902 paint. A simpler crown molding and ceiling medallions were also installed.

The Herter pilasters and Piccirilli marble panels were either lost or too damaged to be reused during removal, and their fate remains unclear. To cut costs, the replacement entablature was made of a composite glue and sawdust mixture pressed into forms rather than carved from wood. While the feeling was similar, the robust architectural effect was diminished. Red marble mantels were installed, and the remaining Venetian window in the room was narrowed to help create the "American" feel. (The 1902 mantels were given away.)

The East Room's chandeliers were rewired and cleaned. The size of the large chandeliers was reduced by several inches, assuming their correct size (68 inches [170 cm] wide and 129 inches [330 cm] high). They were also outfitted with softer internal illumination, and the chains holding the chandeliers shortened. The East Room also had a new parquet floor in a style taken from a design at the Palace of Fontainebleau, and silk curtains over the windows.

The Truman administration did not seek, nor did it receive, many donations of furniture for the White House during the 1952 renovation. But two items were received which made it into the East Room. These were mid-17th century Adam camelback sofas, (Note: James Abbott and Elaine Rice claim the sofas were designed by Robert Adam, and manufactured by Thomas Chippendale.) which were placed beneath the George and Martha Washington paintings.

== Post-1952 refurbishments ==
=== Kennedy refurbishment ===
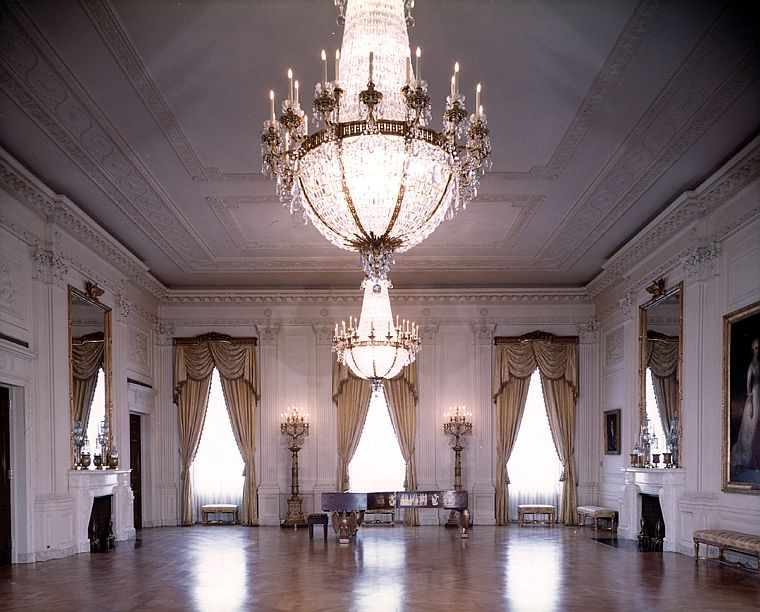
The East Room as altered by Stéphane Boudin during the Kennedy administration

Jacqueline Kennedy made extensive renovations to the White House in 1961 and 1962. Her renovation was overseen by American antiques autodidact Henry Francis du Pont and French interior designer Stéphane Boudin and his company, Maison Jansen. Although many rooms were extensively altered by du Pont and Boudin, the Kennedy restoration made few changes to the East Room.

The biggest change to the room was in the window treatments. Jacqueline Kennedy specifically asked for new curtains for the East Room consisting of opaque silk undercurtains and yellow drapes. Boudin oversaw the design of new draperies, with silk provided by Maison Jansen. A draft design of the drapes and valances was not ready until mid-1963. Boudin, apparently wishing to draw attention to the center window between the fireplaces, designed a valance for the center window while putting all other drapes behind window boxes. For the drapes, Boudin suggested a braid border and tie-backs made of ball fringe covered in satin. Kennedy disapproved of Boudin's proposal for the valance and window boxes, as it did not make use of the historic 1902 gilt window cornices. She did, however, approve of the fabric and tie-backs. Made of a custom-manufactured gold and cream silk lampas, the fabric contained a non-repetitive design of birds, butterflies, cupids, flowers, medallions, roosters, and wheat and featured heavy fringe at the bottom. The drapes were hung in straight panels from the carved and gilded 1902 wooden cornices. The design of the valances was not finalized until April 1964. First Lady Lady Bird Johnson asked Jacqueline Kennedy to assist her in finalizing the design. Originally, they were to be of brocatelle, a jacquard weave fabric similar to brocade but thicker and heavier and with designs in high relief. But this design was countermanded by Boudin. (Note: James Abbott and Elaine Rice hypothesize that Jacqueline Kennedy herself disapproved the brocatelle valances after initially approving them. Her rationale, they suggest, was that the 1952 Truman drapes already obscured the 1902 cornices.) Instead, gold lampas, trimmed with braid and hemmed with gilt, spun-metal twisted fringe at the bottom, was installed in flat panels from behind each cornice. The curtains and valances took nearly three years to design and manufacture, and were not hung in the room until the Johnson administration in 1965. The drapes and valances cost $26,149. The cost was covered by sales of Jacqueline Kennedy's guidebook to the White House, which by 1965 was in its fourth edition.

Another major change involved the fireplace mantels, which were painted at Boudin's request to appear like white marble, unifying the look of the room. (Note: Boudin originally wanted white marble mantels, but agreed to repaint the existing mantels when the cost of white marble proved too high.)

The Kennedy administration was the first to permit smoking in rooms on the State floor. To accommodate smoking, Jacqueline Kennedy wanted portable ashtrays for the East Room. She initially considered modified versions of ashtrays seen at the home of her friend, Bunny Mellon, but rejected this idea in favor of a unique design. Maison Jansen designed stands which featured brass legs shaped like bamboo, brass handles, and Carrara glass tops. The ashtrays cost $280, were manufactured in Maison Jansen's New York City office, and delivered in January 1963. Finding the cost too high (and without any economy of scale cost-savings), Kennedy then designed her own portable standing ashtrays. Twenty were eventually manufactured out of dark wood by White House carpenters, although the gray granite tops for the Kennedy-designed ashtrays were made by Jansen at a cost of $310.

Much of the furniture in the East Room was removed by Boudin to make the room appear to be of a single historic era. The 1902 console tables were removed from the piers between the windows, and the 1902 Louis XVI style floor lamps moved out of the corners and in front of the piers. The 1952 Adam-style camelback sofas were removed at the instigation of du Pont, and replaced with gilt benches. Research conducted by White House Curator Lorraine Waxman Pearce and Jacqueline Kennedy identified the four Monroe-era candelabra (which had been moved), and restored them to the mantels in the room's southern wall. Early 19th-century crystal candelabra (of an indeterminate manufacture) were placed on the mantels on the room's northern wall. To complement the paintings of George and Martha Washington, Jacqueline Kennedy was loaned portraits of a young Bushrod Washington (George Washington's nephew and an Associate Supreme Court Justice) and his wife, Julia Ann Blackburn Washington. These portraits by Chester Harding were hung on the east wall. Kennedy's friend, Jayne Wrightsman, donated two early 19th-century wall sconces, which were wired for electricity by White House staff and hung on either side of the center window.

Jacqueline Kennedy also conceived the idea of constructing a portable stage for use in the East Room. Designed by ballet impresario Lincoln Kirstein and constructed by White House carpenters, the stage was clad in red velvet, small, and easily portable. It was stored off-site in a government warehouse, and took three men eight hours to retrieve, set up, clean, and prepare for performances.

The Kennedys often provided entertainment in the East Room after formal dinners, which necessitated finding seating for these events. The Hoover Art Deco dining room chairs (which by 1961 had been moved to the White House theater) were used for this purpose. Additional seating was provided by cushioned bentwood chairs with canework backs (which had long been owned by the White House but whose provenance was unclear).

=== Johnson and Carter administration alterations ===
While the Kennedy stage was fine for the small, intimate performances in the East Room which the Kennedys favored, President Lyndon B. Johnson and First Lady Lady Bird Johnson favored larger, more elaborate performances. Ballet patron Rebekah Harkness learned of the Johnsons' desire for a larger stage, and contacted noted ballet and theatrical designer Jo Mielziner to design something. Mielziner crafted a stage which took up a full third of the East Room, and featured cream white-painted pilasters matching the room's architecture. Mileziner originally wanted the stage's curtains to have the same fabric used for the East Room drapes. But when he learned of the cost, he settled for American-made gold silk curtains instead. The larger stage took eight men three days to set up.

In 1964, President Johnson issued an executive order creating a new Committee for the Preservation of the White House. This body was tasked with advising the President and First Lady on the decor, preservation, and conservation of the East Room and other public rooms at the White House. The committee has met continuously since then, except for the period 1981 to 1988.

In 1967, the government of Italy donated a late 18th-century carved wood and terra cotta nativity scene to the White House. This 30-piece creche, manufactured in Naples and with the figures clad in original hand-sewn fabrics, was placed on view in the East Room during the Christmas season, and it has been erected there every holiday season since. Ten additional antique Italian nativity figures were donated to the East Room creche set during the Carter administration.

The East Room flooring was replaced in 1978 during the Carter administration. Years of wear and tear had nearly worn through the parquet.

=== Reagan, Clinton, Bush, and Trump refurbishments ===
In 1981, the Reagan administration undertook a private fund-raising campaign to extensively renovate the White House. Hoping to raise $200,000, the project raised $822,641, and Nancy Reagan oversaw a $730,000 project which largely renovated the private living quarters and restored hundreds of antique furniture items throughout the Executive Mansion. The floors, paneling, and plasterwork in the room all were assessed and underwent conservation to ensure their longevity. Mrs. Reagan made only minor improvements to the East Room, however. These included repainting the room (it retained its warm cream color), and adding gold silk swag valances over the draperies. Over-draperies, ordered in the Carter administration, were also replaced in the East Room during the Reagan administration, at a cost of $130,000.

During the Clinton administration, the faux white marble finish painted on the mantels and baseboards in the 1960s was removed to reveal the original "rouge antique" (reddish) marble from Vermont installed during the White House's renovation in 1951. Although the East Room's oak floors had been bare since 1903, three matching $259,330 wool carpets were installed in February 1995. These carpets, ordered in 1990, were designed to reflect the plaster ceiling moldings created during the John Quincy Adams administration in the late 1820s. Woven by Edward Fields Inc. of New York and paid for with private donations raised by the White House Endowment Fund, the carpets were designed to cover most of the floor to protect it from dirt and the occasional pebble stuck in the tread of a shoe.

Minor refurbishment was made to the East Room in September 2003 during the administration of George W. Bush. The Committee for the Preservation of the White House had become dissatisifed with the golden silk swag valances installed during the Reagan presidency. The Kennedy-era Empire-style gold draperies were replaced with nearly identical ones, but the swags were made 12 inches (30 cm) deeper to make them appear more substantial. The room was repainted in the same warm cream color it had for the last century. The refurbishment cost $200,000, and was paid for by private donations to the White House Endowment Fund.

During President Donald Trump's first term, First Lady Melania Trump initiated restoration work for the East Room floor.

== Notable events in the East Room ==
The East Room is used for a wide range of events, which include the swearing-in of Cabinet members and justices of the Supreme Court, press conferences, the signing of legislation, receptions for foreign dignitaries.

=== Presidential funerals and lying in repose ===
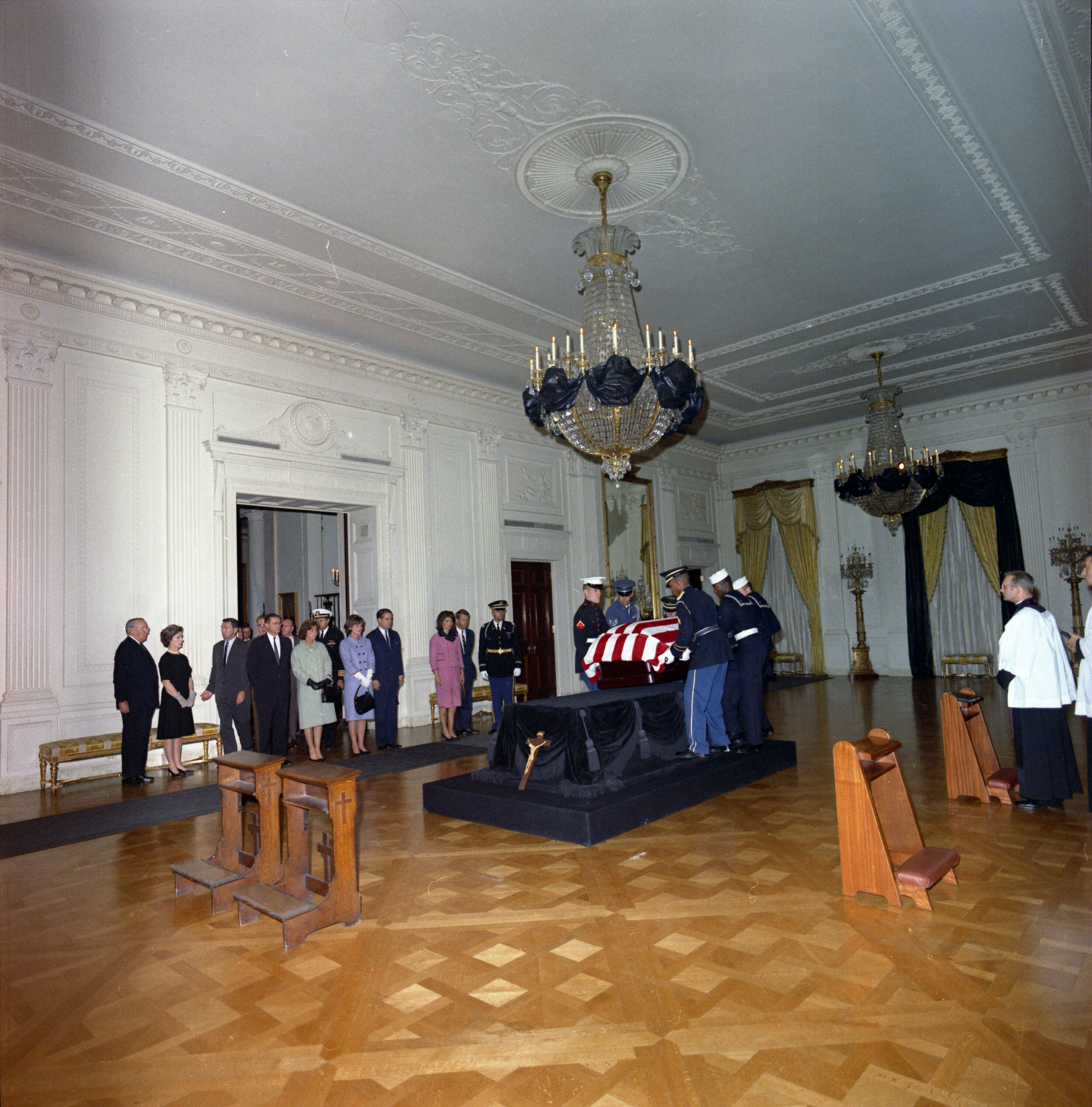
A U.S. armed forces honor guard places the casket bearing the body of President John F. Kennedy on a catafalque in the East Room of the White House at about 4:40 A.M. on November 23, 1963.

Eight presidents have died in office. All but one (James A. Garfield) lay in repose or had a funeral in the East Room. (Note: President Garfield died in Long Branch, New Jersey. His body was transported to Washington, D.C., but taken directly from the train station to the Capitol rotunda for a laying-in-state. His body was then taken directly back to the train station, where his remains were taken to Cleveland, Ohio, for interment.) Presidential funerary events held in the East Room comprise:

- William Henry Harrison – Harrison's body lay in repose for just under three days in the East Room. An Episcopal funeral service was read over Harrison's body on April 7, 1841.
- Zachary Taylor – Taylor's body lay in repose for slightly more than three days in the East Room. An Episcopal funeral service was read over Taylor's body on July 13, 1850.
- Abraham Lincoln – Lincoln's body lay in repose for four days in the East Room. A Presbyterian funeral service was read over Lincoln's body on April 19, 1865.
- William McKinley – McKinley's body arrived in the East Room about 9:00 p.m. on September 16, 1901. He lay in repose until about 8:00 a.m. on September 17, when his remains were removed to the United States Capitol rotunda for a funeral.
- Warren G. Harding – Harding's body lay in repose in the East Room beginning about 11:00 p.m. on August 7, 1923. At 10:00 a.m. on August 8, his remains were removed to the Capitol rotunda for a funeral.
- Franklin D. Roosevelt – Roosevelt's body lay in repose in the East Room beginning about 11:00 a.m. on April 14, 1945. An Episcopal funeral service was read over his body at 4:00 p.m. that same day. The service lasted 25 minutes, and Roosevelt lay in repose from 4:30 p.m. until about 9:00 p.m., when his casket was removed to Union Station for the train ride to Hyde Park, New York.
- John F. Kennedy – Kennedy's body lay in repose in the East Room beginning about 4:40 a.m. on November 23, 1963. A blessing was said by a Roman Catholic priest at 5:00 a.m. on November 23, but the Mass at 10:00 a.m. was held in the State Dining Room rather than East Room. A second Mass (not a funeral Mass), for Kennedy family members and close friends, occurred in the East Room at 11:15 a.m. on November 24. Kennedy's casket was removed from the East Room at about 1:00 p.m.

=== First Family funerals ===
In addition to Presidents, several members of First Families have died while living in the White House. Funerals held in the East Room for family members include:

- Letitia Tyler (wife of John Tyler) – An Episcopal funeral service for her was held in the East Room on September 12, 1842.
- Willie Lincoln (son of Abraham Lincoln) – Lincoln's body lay in repose in the Green Room of the White House until his burial. A Presbyterian funeral service for him was held in the East Room on February 21, 1862. (Pointedly, his family asked that his casket not be moved to the East Room for the service.)
- Caroline Harrison (wife of Benjamin Harrison) – A Presbyterian funeral service for her was held in the East Room on October 27, 1892.
- Ellen Axson Wilson (wife of Woodrow Wilson) – A Presbyterian funeral service for her was held in the East Room on August 10, 1914.
- Calvin Coolidge Jr. (son of Calvin Coolidge) – A Congregationalist funeral service for him was held in the East Room on July 9, 1924.
- Robert Trump (brother of Donald Trump) – A funeral service was held for him in the East Room on August 21, 2020.

=== Weddings ===
As of 2007, the White House had seen 17 weddings. (Note: The Washington Post reported in 1891 that Lucy Scott McFarland, niece of First Lady Lucy Webb Hayes, married Lt. Eric Bergland in the East Room on June 5, 1878. The couple were actually married in Lexington, Kentucky. The Post may have confused the Bergland-McFarland wedding with that of Brigadier General Russell Hastings to Emily Platt, niece of President Hayes' sister. Their marriage occurred in the White House in June 1878, but was held in the Blue Room.) Seven have occurred in the Blue Room, seven in the East Room, two in the Rose Garden, and one in the Yellow Oval Room. The East Room weddings include:

- Mary A. Eastin, niece of First Lady Rachel Jackson, to Lucius J. Polk, a Tennessee cotton planter and state legislator, on April 10, 1832.
- Mary Anne Lewis, daughter of one of President Jackson's U.S. Army friends, married Alphonse Pageot, chargé d'affaires at the Embassy of France, on November 29, 1832.
- Elizabeth Tyler, daughter of President John Tyler, married William Waller, Virginia businessman, on January 31, 1842.
- Nellie Grant, daughter of President Grant, married Algernon Sartoris, wealthy English singer and son of Adelaide Kemble, on May 21, 1874.
- Alice Roosevelt, daughter of President Theodore Roosevelt, married Representative Nicholas Longworth, on February 17, 1906.
- Jessie Wilson, daughter of President Wilson, married diplomat Francis Bowes Sayre Sr. on November 25, 1913.
- Lynda Bird Johnson, daughter of President Lyndon B. Johnson married Chuck Robb, a captain in the United States Marine Corps and future Senator from Virginia, on December 9, 1967.

=== Other important East Room events ===
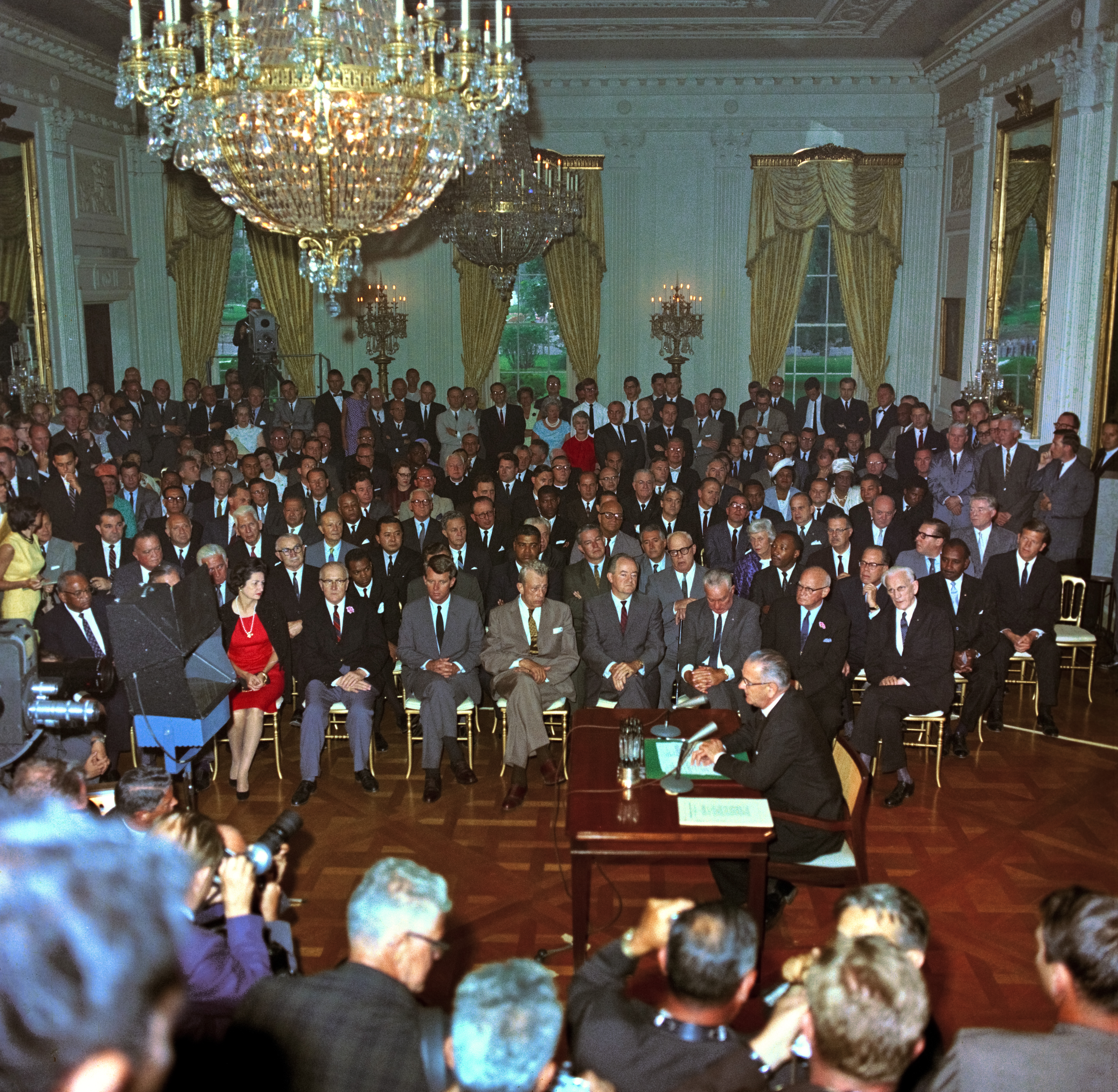
President Lyndon Johnson addresses the nation from the East Room prior to signing the 1964 Civil Rights Act into law.

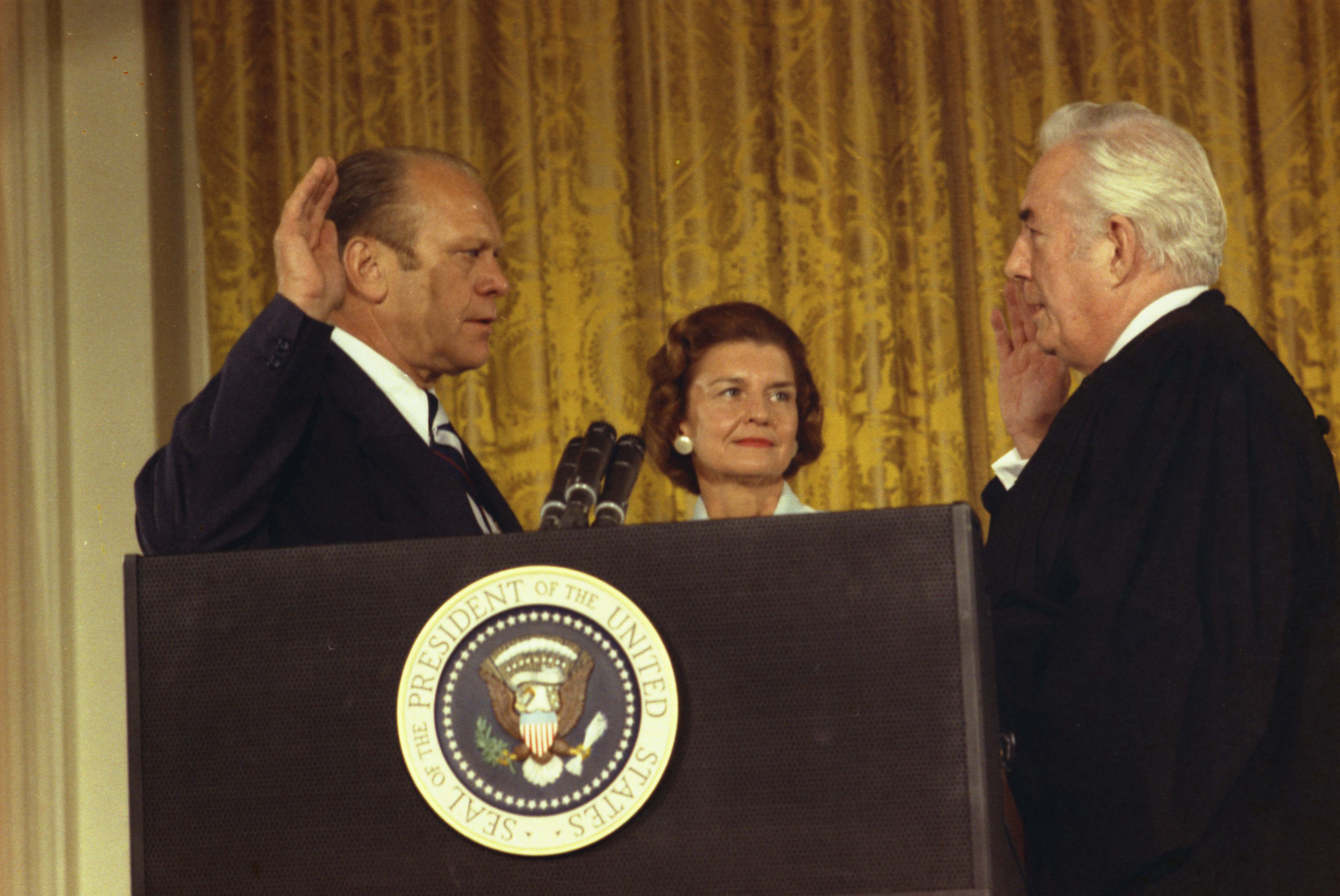
Gerald Ford is sworn in as 38th President of the United States in the East Room on August 8, 1974.

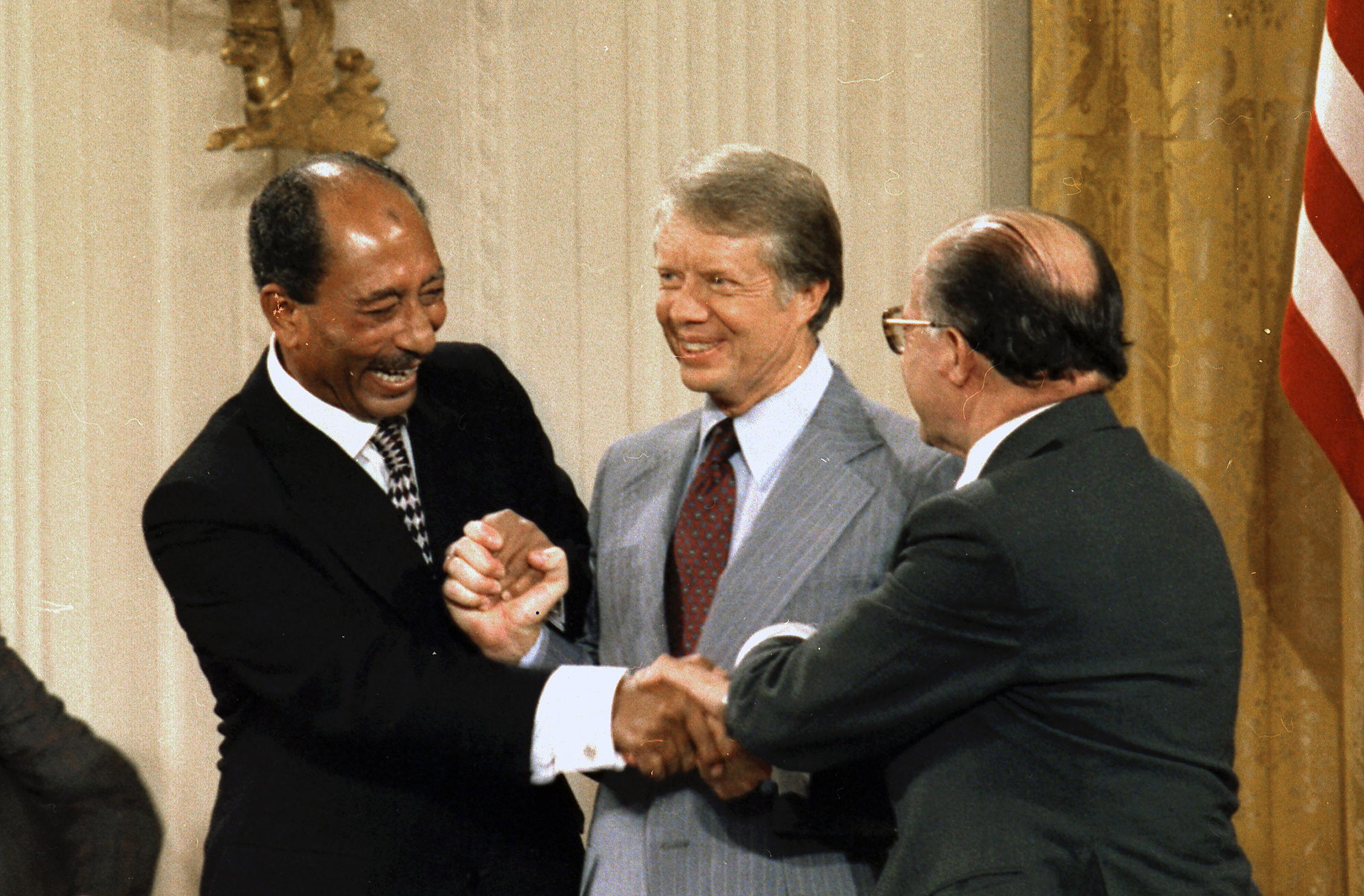
Sadat, Carter, and Begin famously shake hands at the same time in the East Room after signing the Camp David Peace Accords. in 1978.

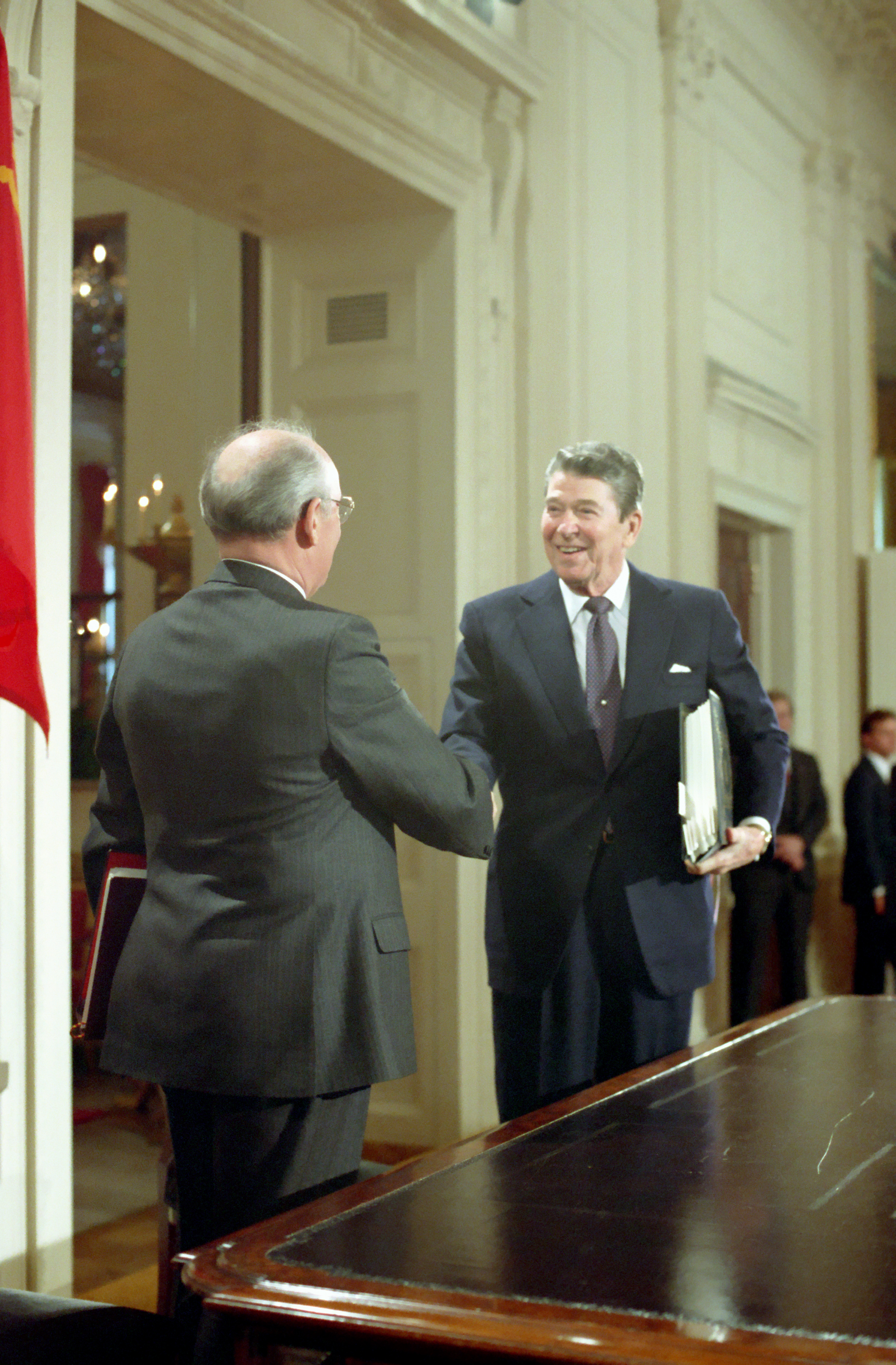
Reagan and Gorbachev shake hands in the East Room after signing the historic INF Treaty.

The East Room has served as the site of many important ceremonies, legislation and treaty signings and other events. Some of these are:

- 1860 – 15th President James Buchanan received the first diplomatic mission from Japan in the East Room on May 18.
- 1861 – The funeral of Colonel Elmer E. Ellsworth, the first Union Army soldier to die in the American Civil War, was held in the East Room on May 25. Ellsworth, commander of the 11th New York Infantry ("Fire Zouaves"), had become a close friend of Lincoln's, who wept when he learned of Ellsworth's death.
- 1890 – The funerals of Mrs. Delinda Catlin Tracy, 57 and Miss Mary Farrington Tracy, 35, were held in the East Room on February 3. They were the wife and daughter of Secretary of the Navy Benjamin F. Tracy, and died in a fire at their home two blocks from the White House on February 3. Tracy himself would have died of smoke inhalation trying to rescue them had not President Benjamin Harrison rushed to the scene and revived him.
- 1929 – President Calvin Coolidge signed the Kellogg–Briand Pact in the East Room on January 17. President Herbert Hoover then met with representatives of the governments that ratified the Kellogg-Briand Pact in the East Room on July 24.
- 1936 – President Franklin D. Roosevelt presided over a state funeral in the East Room for his long-time advisor Louis Howe on April 21.
- 1943 – The agreement establishing the United Nations Relief and Rehabilitation Administration was signed in the East Room by representatives from 44 nations on November 9.
- 1957 – President Dwight D. Eisenhower took the presidential oath of office in the East Room on January 20. The Constitution of the United States requires the oath to be administered at noon on January 20. But since this was a Sunday, Eisenhower took the oath in private at the required time. A public inauguration was held the following day.
- 1964 – President Lyndon B. Johnson signed the Civil Rights Act of 1964 in the East Room on July 2. The ceremony was nationally televised, and more than 100 Senators and civil rights leaders attended the event.
- 1973 – President Richard Nixon and Leonid Brezhnev, leader of the Soviet Union, signed the Scientific and Technical Cooperation Agreement in the Field of Peaceful Uses of Atomic Energy between the U.S. and the U.S.S.R. in the East Room on June 21.
- 1974 – President Nixon gave a farewell address to the White House staff in the East Room at 9:00 a.m. on August 9. His resignation as President of the United States became effective at 11:35 a.m. when it was received by Secretary of State Henry Kissinger. Vice President Gerald Ford took the presidential oath of office in the East Room at 12:03 p.m. the same day.
- 1976 – President Ford signed the Peaceful Nuclear Explosions Treaty in the East Room on May 28 while, simultaneously, Soviet leader Leonid Brezhnev signed the treaty in Moscow.
- 1978 – President Carter, Egyptian President Anwar Sadat, and Israeli Prime Minister Menachem Begin signed the Camp David Accords in the East Room on September 17 at 11:00 p.m.
- 1987 – President Ronald Reagan and Soviet leader Mikhail Gorbachev signed the Intermediate-Range Nuclear Forces Treaty (INF Treaty) in the East Room on December 8.
- 1990 – President George H. W. Bush and Soviet President Gorbachev signed five treaties in the East Room on June 2: the 1990 Chemical Weapons Accord, the USSR–USA Maritime Boundary Agreement, new protocols governing the 1974 Threshold Test Ban Treaty and Peaceful Nuclear Explosions Treaty, and the Agreement on Trade Relations Between the United States of America and the Union of Soviet Socialist Republics (which provided for reciprocal Most Favored Nation status for the Soviet Union, improved market access in the Soviet Union for U.S. goods and services, freer operation of U.S. commercial representations in the USSR, and stronger intellectual property rights protection).
- 2011 – President Barack Obama announced the death of Osama bin Laden in the East Room on May 2.
- 2025 - President Donald Trump (joined with US Vice President JD Vance, US Secretary of State Marco Rubio, and US Secretary of Defense Pete Hegseth) announced that Operation Midnight Hammer, a series of US airstrikes on Iranian nuclear sites, was a 'spectacular military success' from the East Room on the evening of June 21st from the East Room.

== In popular culture ==
The East Room has appeared in a number of motion pictures about the president of the United States. It is one of the most commonly depicted spaces in the White House, along with the Entrance Hall, Cross Hall, and West Sitting Hall. Accuracy in its depiction has generally been good. One outstanding example is the 1944 biographical picture Wilson, which was extremely accurate (even down to the style of paneling). The film's art director Wiard Ihnen and set decorator Thomas Little won an Academy Award for their work on the film. Many recent films have used Zuber wallpaper to depict the East Room—the same wallpaper purchased by Jacqueline Kennedy during the East Room's 1963 redecoration. President Bill Clinton gave the producers of the 1995 film The American President extensive access to the White House, which allowed them to create a superb replica of the East Room as well. Far less successful was the 2005 television series Commander in Chief, which depicted the East Room as a kind of shabby hotel lobby.

A life-size replica of the East Room was built at the Richard Nixon Presidential Library and Museum. It is slightly larger in size and, while very similar, not completely accurate in its details.

The East Room made news on September 29, 2014, after The Washington Post revealed that Omar J. Gonzalez had run through the room during his September 19, 2014, intrusion at the White House. Initially, the United States Secret Service reported that Gonzalez, who jumped the fence at the North Lawn and raced to the mansion, had only gotten a few steps into the Entrance Hall. But the Post revealed that the knife-wielding Gonzalez knocked down a Secret Service agent, ran into the Cross Hall, and ran through the East Room before being tackled by a counter-assault agent at the door leading to the Green Room.

== Bibliography ==
- Abbott, James A.; Rice, Elaine M. (1998). Designing Camelot: The Kennedy White House Restoration. New York: Van Nostrand Reinhold. ISBN 0442025327.
- Ang, Adrian U-jin (2007). "Calvin Coolidge (1923-1929)". In Hodge, Carl C.; Nolan, Cathal J. (eds.). U.S. Presidents and Foreign Policy: From 1789 to the Present. Santa Barbara, Calif.: ABC-CLIO. ISBN 9781851097906.
- Baker, Jean (2002). "The Lincoln White House: Stage for the Republic's Survival". In Seale, William (ed.). The White House: Actors and Observers. Boston: Northeastern University Press. ISBN 155553547X.
- Baker, Jean H. (1987). Mary Todd Lincoln: A Biography. New York: W.W. Norton & Company. ISBN 0393024369.
- Bell, Brian; Scott, Rosanne (2003). The Insight Guides: Washington D.C. Singapore: GeoCenter. ISBN 9789814120494.
- Belanger, Jeff (2008). Who's Haunting the White House?: The President's Mansion and the Ghosts Who Live There. New York: Sterling Publishing Company. ISBN 9781402738227.
- Bib, A. Burnley (March 1903). "The Restoration of the White House". House & Garden: 127–138.
- Black, Conrad (2003). Franklin Delano Roosevelt: Champion of Freedom. New York: Public Affairs. ISBN 9781610392136.
- Brown, Glenn (January 1916). "Personal Reminiscences of Charles Follen McKim". Architectural Record: 84–88.
- Campbell, Gordon, ed. (2006). The Grove Encyclopedia of Decorative Arts. New York: Oxford University Press. ISBN 9780195189483.
- Carrier, Thomas J. (2000). The White House, the Capitol, and the Supreme Court: Historic Self-Guided Tours. Charleston, S.C.: Arcadia. ISBN 0738505579.
- Castle, Alfred L. (1998). Diplomatic Realism: William R. Castle, Jr., and American Foreign Policy, 1919-1953. Honolulu: University of Hawaii Press. ISBN 0824820096.
- Chapin, Miles; Prato, Rodica (2006). 88 Keys: The Making of a Steinway Piano. Pompton Plains, N.J.: Amadeus Press. ISBN 1574671529.
- Cooper, John Milton Jr. (2009). Woodrow Wilson: A Biography. New York: Alfred A. Knopf. ISBN 9780307265418.
- Daniel, Jean Houston; Daniel, Price (1969). Executive Mansions and Capitols of America. Waukesha, Wisc.: Country Beautiful.
- Dietz, Ulysses G.; Watters, Sam (2009). Dream House: The White House as an American Home. New York: Acanthus Press. ISBN 9780926494657.
- Eisenhower, John S.D. (2008). Zachary Taylor. New York: Times Books. ISBN 9780805082371.
- Eissenstat, Bernard W. (1975). The Soviet Union: The Seventies and Beyond. Lexington, Mass.: Lexington Books. ISBN 066992718X.
- Ellison, Betty Boles (2014). The True Mary Todd Lincoln: A Biography. Jefferson, N.C.: McFarland & Company. ISBN 9780786478361.
- Emerson, Jason (2012). Giant in the Shadows: The Life of Robert T. Lincoln. Carbondale, Ill.: Southern Illinois University Press. ISBN 9780809330553.
- Epstein, Daniel Mark (2009). The Lincolns: Portrait of a Marriage. New York: Ballantine Books. ISBN 9780345478009.
- Feigen, Richard L. (2000). Tales From the Art Crypt: The Painters, the Museums, the Curators, the Collectors, the Auctions, the Art. New York: Alfred A. Knopf. ISBN 039457169X.
- Finnegan, Cara (2014). "Picturing the Presidents: Obama and the Visual Politics of White House Art". In Vaughn, Justin S.; Mercieca, Jennifer R. (eds.). The Rhetoric of Heroic Expectations: Establishing the Obama Presidency. College Station, Tex.: Texas A&M University Press. ISBN 9781623490423.
- Garrett, Wendell D. (1995). Our Changing White House. Boston: Northeastern University Press. ISBN 1555532225.
- Gawrych, George W. (2000). The Albatross of Decisive Victory: War and Policy Between Egypt and Israel in the 1967 and 1973 Arab-Israeli Wars. Westport, Conn.: Greenwood Press. ISBN 0313313024.
- Grafton, John; Daley, James, eds. (2006). 28 Great Inaugural Addresses. Mineola, N.Y.: Dover Publications. ISBN 0486446212.
- Greene, Meg (2007). William H. Harrison. Minneapolis: Twenty-First Century Books. ISBN 9780822515111.
- Grimmett, Richard F. (2009). St. John's Church, Lafayette Square: The History and Heritage of the Church of the Presidents, Washington, D.C. Minneapolis: Mill City Press. ISBN 9781934248539.
- Harris, Bill (2002). The White House: An Illustrated Tour. Philadelphia: Courage Books. ISBN 0762414111.
- Harris, William C. (2004). Lincoln's Last Months. Cambridge, Mass.: Belknap Press of Harvard University Press. ISBN 0674011996.
- Hay, Melba Porter (2014). "Letitia Christian Tyler". In Gould, Lewis L. (ed.). American First Ladies: Their Lives and Their Legacy. New York: Routledge. ISBN 9781135311483.
- Johnson, Lady Bird (2007). A White House Diary. Austin, Tex: University of Texas Press. ISBN 9780292717497.
- Kalb, Deborah (2013). "Housing of the Executive Branch". In Nelson, Michael (ed.). Guide to the Presidency and the Executive Branch. Thousand Oaks, Calif.: CQ Press. ISBN 978-1568020181.
- Kaufman, Scott (2007). Rosalynn Carter: Equal Partner in the White House. Lawrence, Kan.: University Press of Kansas. ISBN 9780700615445.
- Kelly, Martin; Kelly, Melissa (2007). The Everything American Presidents Book: All You Need to Know About the Leaders Who Shaped U.S. History. Avon, Mass.: Adams Media. ISBN 9781598692587.
- Klamkin, Marian (1972). White House China. New York: Scribner. ISBN 068412758X.
- Klara, Robert (2013). The Hidden White House: Harry Truman and the Reconstruction of America's Most Famous Residence. New York: Thomas Dunne Books. ISBN 9781250000279.
- Langguth, A.J. (2010). Driven West: Andrew Jackson and the Trail of Tears to the Civil War. New York: Simon and Schuster. ISBN 9781439193273.
- Library of Congress (1950). District of Columbia: Sesquicentennial of the Establishment of the Permanent Seat of Government. Washington, D.C.: Government Printing Office.
- Loevy, Robert D., ed. (1997). The Civil Rights Act of 1964: The Passage of the Law That Ended Racial Segregation. Albany, N.Y.: State University of New York Press. ISBN 0791433617.
- Long, Michael E. (2004). "Preserving the President's House: The Office of the White House Curator". In Watson, Robert P. (ed.). Life in the White House: A Social History of the First Family and the President's House. Albany, N.Y.: State University of New York Press. ISBN 0791460975.
- Manchester, William (1967). The Death of a President, November 20-November 25, 1963. New York: Harper & Row.
- Maril, Nadja (1989). American Lighting, 1840-1940. West Chester, Pa.: Schiffer Publishing. ISBN 0887401775.
- May, Gary (2008). John Tyler. New York: Times Books/Henry Holt and Co. ISBN 9780805082388.
- McCreary, Donna (2012). "Fashion Plate or Fashion Trendsetter?". In Williams, Frank J.; Burkhimer, Michael (eds.). The Mary Lincoln Enigma: Historians on America's Most Controversial First Lady. Carbondale, Ill.: Southern Illinois University Press. ISBN 9780809331246.
- McCullough, David (2003). Truman. New york: Simon and Schuster. ISBN 9780743260299.
- McGregor, James H.S. (2007). Washington From the Ground Up. Cambridge, Mass.: Belknap Press of Harvard University Press. ISBN 9780674026049.
- Miller, Judith (2005). Furniture: World Styles From Classical to Contemporary. New York: DK Publishing. ISBN 075661340X.
- Monkman, Betty C. (2000). The White House: The Historic Furnishings and First Families. Washington, D.C.: White House Historical Association. ISBN 0789206242.
- Office of Armed Forces Information and Education (1961). A Pocket Guide to Japan. Tokyo: Embassy of the United States to Japan.
- Patterson, Bradley H. Jr. (2000). The White House Staff: Inside the West Wing and Beyond. Washington, D.C.: Brookings Institution Press. ISBN 0815769504.
- Phillips-Schrock, Patrick (2013). The White House: An Illustrated Architectural History. Jefferson, N.C.: McFarland & Company. ISBN 9780786471522.
- Pitch, Anthony (2008). "They Have Killed Papa Dead!": The Road to Ford's Theatre, Abraham Lincoln's Murder, and the Rage for Vengeance. Hanover, N.H.: Steerforth Press. ISBN 9781586421588.
- Sale, Sara L. (2010). Bess Wallace Truman: Harry's White House "Boss". Lawrence, Kan.: University Press of Kansas. ISBN 9780700617418.
- Singleton, Esther (1907). The Story of the White House. New York: The McClure Company.
- Skidmore, Max J. (2004). After the White House: Former Presidents As Private Citizens. New York: Palgrave Macmillan. ISBN 0312295596.
- Stevens, Robley D. (1961). Your Handbook of Presidents and the White House. Boston: Bruce Humphries.
- United Nations Information Office (1943). Helping the People to Help Themselves: The Story of the United Nations Relief and Rehabilitation Administration. Washington, D.C.: United Nations.
- Washington Sight-Seeing and Shopping Guide. Washington, D.C.: W. Osgood. 1905.
- Watson, Robert C.; Yon, Richard M. (2011). "Lincoln as Father: Dealing With Tragedy in the White House". In Watson, Robert P.; Pederson, William D.; Williams, Frank J. (eds.). Lincoln's Enduring Legacy: Perspectives From Great Thinkers, Great Leaders, and the American Experiment. Lanham, Md.: Lexington Books. ISBN 9780739149898.
- West, J.B.; Kotz, Mary Lynn (1973). Upstairs at the White House: My Life With the First Ladies. New York: Coward, McCann & Geoghegan. ISBN 069810546X.
- Whitney, David C. (1975). The Graphic Story of the American Presidents. Chicago: J. G. Ferguson Pub. Co.
- Wolff, Perry (1962). A Tour of the White House With Mrs. John F. Kennedy. Garden City, N.Y.: Doubleday.
