= Paithani =

Variety of sari

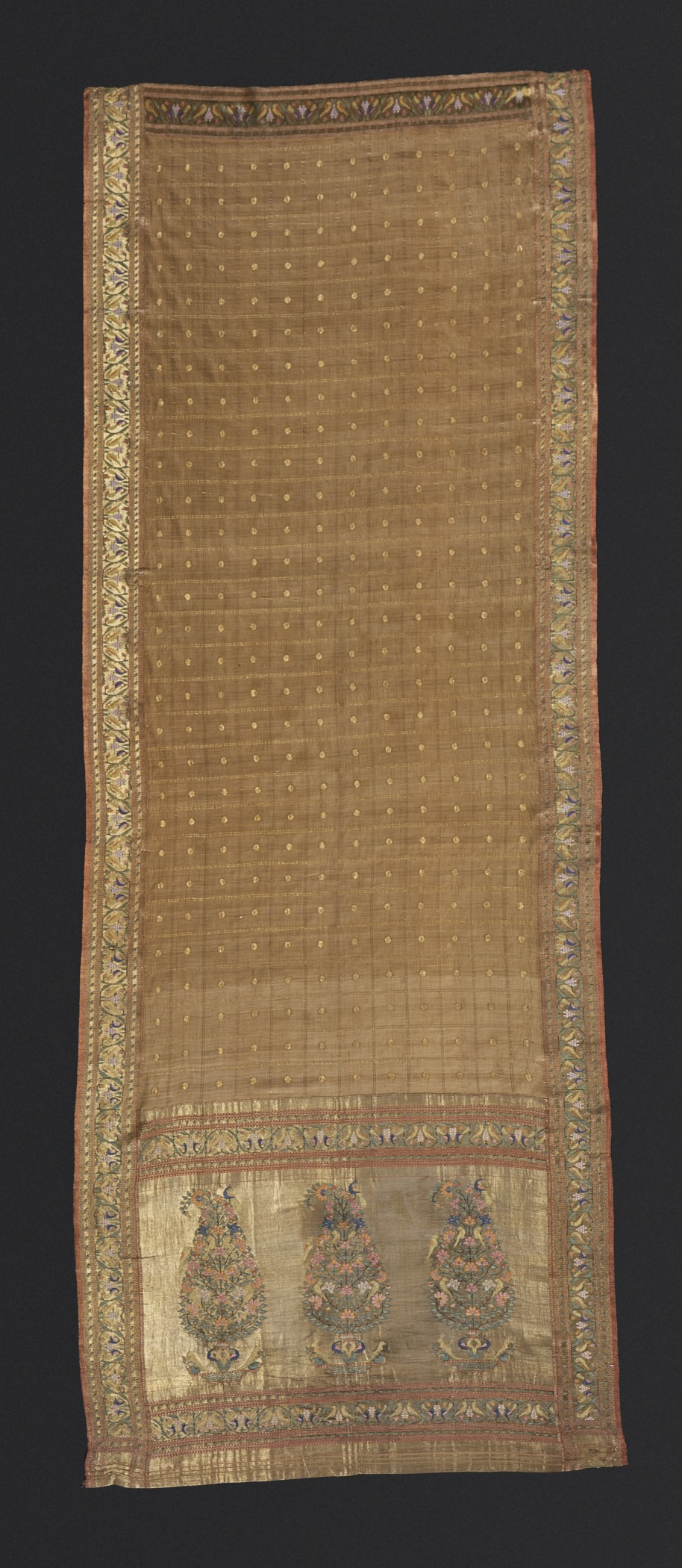
Paithani bridal sari

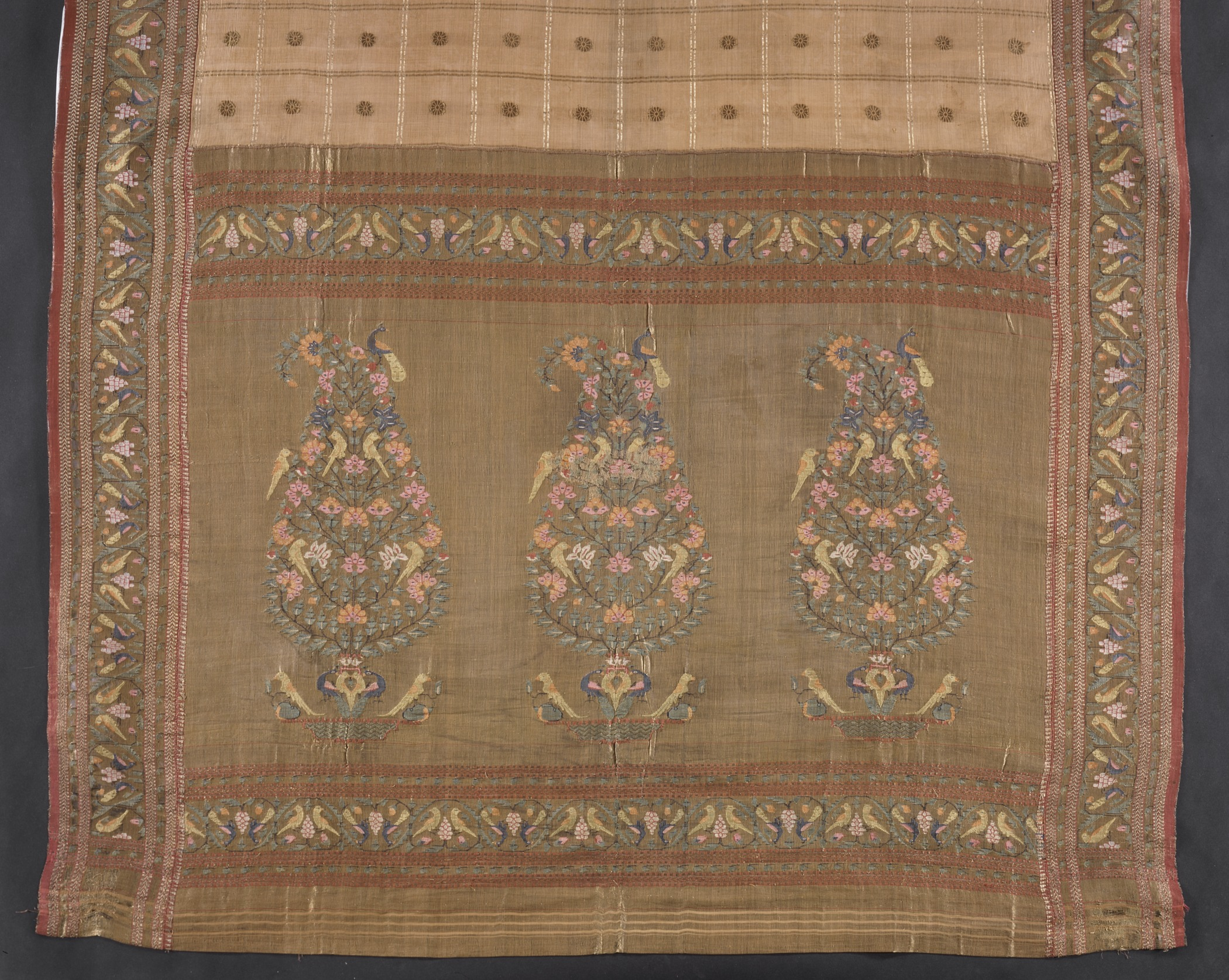
Paithani bridal sari

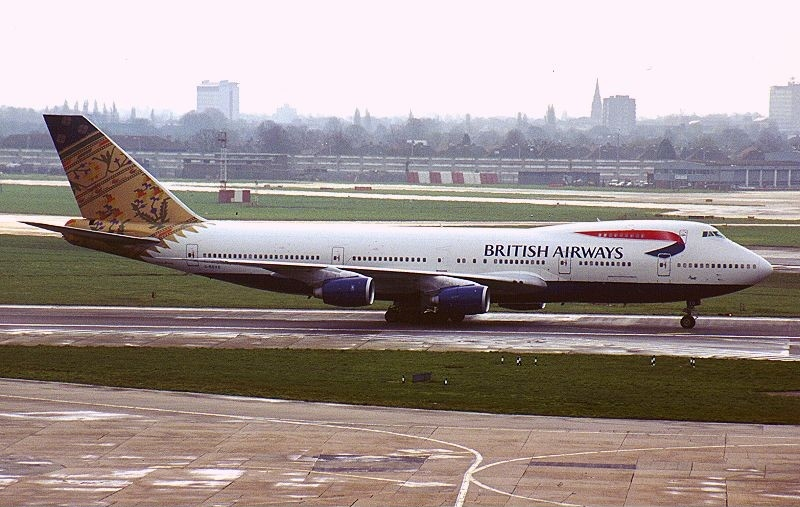
An airplane with a Paithani made by Shri Shantilal Bhandge and design created by Meera Mehta an Indian textile designer on its tail.

Paithani (['pəɪ.ʈʰaːɳiː]) is a variety of sari, named after the Paithan in Chhatrapati Sambhajinagar district from the state of Maharashtra in India where the sari was first made by hand. Present day Yeola, a town in Nashik, Maharashtra is the largest manufacturer of Paithani.

Paithani is characterised by selvedges of an oblique square design, and a padar with a peacock design. Plain as well as spotted designs are available. Among other varieties, single coloured and kaleidoscope-coloured designs are also popular. The kaleidoscopic effect is achieved by using one colour for weaving lengthwise and another for weaving width wise.

== History ==
Paithani was also known as "Pratishthani" as it was originated in the ancient city of Pratishthan (presently known as Paithan). Paithani sari flourished in the Satavahana Dynasty during the 2nd C. BCE to the 2nd C. CE. The dynasty encouraged and boosted the trade of Paithani with Greco-Roman countries. During the period of the Satavahanas records were being scripted on the walls of caves. The script has the description of weaving, dyeing, and fine embroidery in the Gatha Sattasai written by a poet of the king Hala in the Satavahana period. The roman mathematician Ptolemy wrote that the textiles of Baithana (Paithan) are among the finest textile fabrics. References to Paithani can be found in many ancient Hindu and Buddhist texts. Paithani is also known as "Dev vastra" (literally, "fabric of God"). Historians have noted fine Paithani saris with delicate gold and silver thread-work being sold in Greece in exchange for gold between 200 and 400 BC. Silk threads and fragments of fabrics that resembled the original patterns as seen in the Paithani were found at Nevasa (a town near Paithan) in 1966. In the 17th century, the Peshwas ruled over Paithan and shifted a few of the weavers to Yeola, a town in Nashik district. Gradually, Yeola established itself as the new hub of the traditional Paithani sari. Today, there are around 6000 to 7000 weavers in Yeola and 13000 weavers in the surrounding villages.

== Technical details ==
Paithani is a sari made of silk and zari. It is a plain weave, with weft figuring designs according to the principles of tapestry. Traditionally, Paithanis had a coloured, cotton muslin field that often contained considerable supplementary zari patterning. However, in the 19th century, silk fields were also woven.

=== Materials used ===
There are three types of silk threads used:

- Charkha: This is widely used. It is cheap, dull and uneven.
- Ciddle-Gatta: Fine quality silk, thin shear, shiny, smooth and even.
- China silk: Very expensive to use.

This raw silk is cleansed with caustic soda, dyed in the requisite shades, the threads are carefully separated. Khari (true/real) zari costs about ₹1,800 (US$19) for 250 grams (8.8 oz).

Golden threads are obtained from Surat, the quality being 1,100 metres (1,200 yd) per tola (11.664 grams). Gold threads are used in double and one of the finest varieties so much so that the closely woven surface looks like a mirror. The texture of the fabric is fairly compact with about 160 ends and 170 picks per inch (2.6 cm).

Zari is a metallic yarn, made of pure silver. Originally, zari was manufactured in Yeola; Surat now being another zari-producing centre. Initially, zari used in making Paithani was drawn from pure gold. However, silver is the affordable substitute today.

=== Material assembly ===
20–22 denier-organized silk is used in warp, while twofold ply, very lightly twisted 30–32 silk is used for weft. The warp yarn costs ₹2900–3200 per kilogram whereas weft yarn costs ₹2400–3000 per kilogram. A single sari may weigh from 1.45 kg (3.2 lb) or more depending upon the weight of the silk and zari used. The warp is usually made in the peg or drums warping process and is tied in ball form at the back of loom. It is usually made for 2 pieces of sari and is about 11.5 metres (38 ft) in length. While coloured silk is mostly used in figure work, the solid selvedge have extra weft figuring threads. The weft for selvedges and body being different, three shuttle weaving is adopted, two for the selvedge and one for the plain body. The selvedge therefore appears as separately woven and then stitched to the body of the sari. Some times a separate padar warp is twisted on the body. The end piece has fine silk. Warp threads are only of zari forming a golden ground upon which angular, brightly coloured silk designs are woven in the interlocked weft, producing a tapestry effect which makes it very elegant.

== Variations and Motifs ==
In the days of Peshwas, the selvedges and the Padar were made of pure gold mixed with copper to give it strength. The proportion was 1 kg of gold to 1 tola of copper. The combination was spun into a fine wire called the zari. In recent times, zari is made of silver, coated with gold plating. The selvedges are created with interlocked weft technique either with coloured silk or zari. In the selvedge woven with a zari, ground coloured silk patterns are added as supplementary weft inlay against the zari usually in the form of flower or a creeping vine.

Two types of selvedge are the Narali and the Pankhi.

=== Sari ===
Due to proximity to the Ajanta caves, the influence of the Buddhist paintings can be seen in the woven Paithani motifs:

- The Kamal or lotus flower on which Buddha sits or stands
- The Hans (swan) motif
- The Ashraffi motif
- The Asawalli (flowering vines), became very popular during the Peshwa's period
- The Bangadimor, peacock in bangle
- The Popat-Maina
- The Humarparinda, pheasant
- The Amar Vell
- The Narali motif (coconut), very common

Small motifs like circles, stars, kuyri, rui phool, kalas pakhhli, chandrakor, clusters of 3 leaves, were very common for the body of the sari.

=== Padar/Pallu (selvedge) ===
- Muniya, a kind of parrot used in selvedges and always found in green colour with an occasional red touch at the mouth
- Panja, a geometrical flower-like motif, most often outlined in red
- Barwa, 12 strands of a ladder; 3 strands on each side
- Laher, design is done in the centre to strengthen the zari
- Muthada, a geometrical design
- Asawalli, a flower pot with a flowering plant
- Mor, a peacock

== Manufacturing processes ==
=== Dyeing ===
The weavers of Yeola dye yarns themselves. Yarn is purchased from Bangalore.

- Vat dyes and acid dyes are used because of its favorable properties. The government provides with a shade card of 400 samples, which acts as a collection for the buyer to choose from.
- Bleaching and dyeing is done in copper vessels. 20 to 30 grams of dye powder is used per kg of yarn, which is mixed in water. Acid is used for fixation. Coconut oil is used to give a soft finish to silk. The yarns are dipped in the dye bath for 30 to 40 minutes using copper rods. It is then removed, washed a few times in water and then squeezed. The yarn is dried in the shade.

The dominant traditional colours of vegetable dyes included:

- Aboli (Light pink)
- Firozi (cyan)
- Gujri (black and white)
- Kalichandrakala (black)
- Mirani
- Morphankhi (peacock green)
- Motia (pale pink)
- Neeligunji (blue)
- Pasila
- Pophali (chrome yellow)
- Samprus (green-red)
- Sankirodak (white)
- Uddani (a fainter black)
- Vangi (aubergine purple)
1. The kali/vakhar is brought from Bangalore which is a bundle of silk threads ultimately known as one thok.
2. The raw material is dipped in hot water and diluted in khar (salt), for about 15 mins.
3. The material is then squeezed by putting a rod in between the kali to remove the excess of impurities and again dipped in cold water for about 2-3 times.
4. The dye bath is prepared in which the proportion varies according to the hues and shapes
5. The kali is dipped in the dye bath, removed, and dried completely. This is repeated 2 to 3 times.
6. It is then washed in cold water to make it much smoother and lustrous.
7. After the dyeing process is completed, the silk threads are wounded upon the Asari with a very smooth touch which is done by the women. A Rahat was also used for wounding but since it was very much time-consuming. They started using the machines made up of the cycle wheel which is less time-consuming.
8. From the asari, the silk threads are transferred on a kandi.
9. The silk threads are finally set onto the loom.

=== Loom ===
It takes approximately one day to set the silk threads on the loom. "Tansal" is used to put the "wagi". The "pavda" works like the paddle to speed up the weaving. The "jhatka" is used to push the "kandi" from one side to the other. "Pushthe" is used in designing the selvedge of Paithani in which it is punched according to design application. "Pagey" are tied to the loom. The threads are then passed through "fani".

There are two types of motion:

- Primary motions:
1. Shedding — dividing the warp sheet or shed into two layers, one above the other for the passage of shuttle with the weft threads.
2. Picking — passing a pick of weft from one selvage of a cloth through the warp threads.
3. Beating — dividing the last pick through the fell of cloth with the help of slay fixed on the reel.
- Secondary motions:
1. Take up motion — taking up the cloth when being woven and winding it on the roller.
2. Let off motion — letting the warp wound on a warp beam, when the cloth is taken up on the cloth roller beam.

Taking up and letting off the warp are done simultaneously.

=== Weaving ===
Paithani saris are silks in which there is no extra weft forming figures. The figuring weave was obtained by a plain tapestry technique. There are three techniques of weaving;

- Split tapestry weave - the simplest weave where two weft threads are woven up to adjacent warp threads and then reversed. The warp threads are then cut and retied to a different colour.
- Interlocking method - two wefts are interlocked with each other where the colour change is required. The figuring weft is made of a number of coloured threads, weaving plain with warp threads and interlocked on either side with the grounds weft threads are invariably gold threads which interlock with the figure weft threads, thus forming the figure. This system of interlocking weaves, known as kadiyal, is done so that there are no extra floats on the back of the motif thus making the design nearly reversible.
- Dobe-tailing method - two threads go around the same warp, one above the other, creating a dobe-tailing or tooth-comb effect.

Weaving could take between 18 and 24 months, depending upon the complexity of the design. Today there are many weavers who are working for the revival of this treasured weave.

== Types ==
Paithani can be classified by three criteria: motifs, weaving, and colours.

=== Motif ===
- Morbangadi : The word bangadi means bangle and mor means peacock. So morbangadi means a peacock in a bangle or in a bangle shape. The motif is woven onto the padar, the design sometimes having a single dancing peacock. The saris using this motif are very expensive because of the design.
- Munia brocade: Munia means parrot. Parrots are woven on the padar as well as in the selvedge. Parrots are always in leaf green colour. The parrots in silk are also called tota-maina.
- Lotus brocade: lotus motifs are used in padar and sometimes on the selvedge. The lotus motif consists of 7-8 colours.

=== Weaving ===
- Kadiyal selvedge sari: Kadiyal means interlocking. The warp and the weft of the selvedge are of the same colour while the body has different colours for warp and weft.
- Kad/Ekdhoti: A single shuttle is used for weaving of weft. The colours of the warp yarn is different from that of the weft yarn. It has a narali selvedge and simple buttis like paisa, watana, etc. Kad is also a form of lungi and is used by male Maharashtrians.

=== Colour ===
- Kalichandrakala: pure black sari with red selvedge.
- Raghu: parrot green coloured sari.
- Shirodak: pure white sari.

== Contemporary relevance ==
=== Authenticity and Imitations ===
Authentic Paithani sarees are characterized by their handwoven silk, intricate zari work (often with 80% silver and 20% gold), and motifs such as Peacocks, Lotuses, and Asavali (vine) patterns, requiring months to complete a single saree. However, the market is inundated with power loom semi-Paithani sarees, which replicate traditional designs using synthetic materials and mechanized processes, and are sold at significantly lower prices (Rs. 2,000–5,000 compared to the average starting prices of Rs. 20,000 for authentic Paithani). These sarees, often labeled as ‘Paithani’, mislead consumers who are unaware of the differences in original product for quality and craftsmanship.

In 2010, recognizing its unique origin and craftsmanship, Paithani received GI status under India’s Geographical Indications of Goods Act, 1999.

== See also ==
- Solapuri Chaddar
- Himroo
- Meera Mehta
