= Acca cloth =

Ornamental silk cloth decorated with gold threads

Acca cloth was an ornamental silk cloth decorated with gold threads. It was a fabric of the fourteenth century. Acca was named after the city Acre in Israel. The material was in use for royal applications and church vestments.

== See also ==
- Brocade
- Zari
