= Meera Mehta =

Indian textile designer

- Born: Mumbai, Maharashtra, India
- Education: National Institute of Design
- Known for: Textile design, weaving, Paithani sari revival

Meera Mehta is a weaver and textile designer, based in Mumbai, India. The textiles she has created have been displayed in museums and galleries around the world. Mehta is best known for her revival of the Paithani sari.

== Career ==
In particular, she has been responsible for the revival of the 'Paithani' sari, a legendary sari, which has been woven in Maharashtra, India for the past 2,000 years in a town located close to the Ajanta caves, to its original grandeur. The Paithani sari is known for its intricate weave of pure silk and gold. Many of the designs have been influenced by Buddhist paintings which can be seen in the woven Paithani motifs. Radha Parthasarathy, the vice president of the Crafts Council of India (CCI), says that Mehta's designs are both "stylised and sophisticated." Her Paithani saris can take between 2 months to a year to complete, based on the complexity and size of the design.

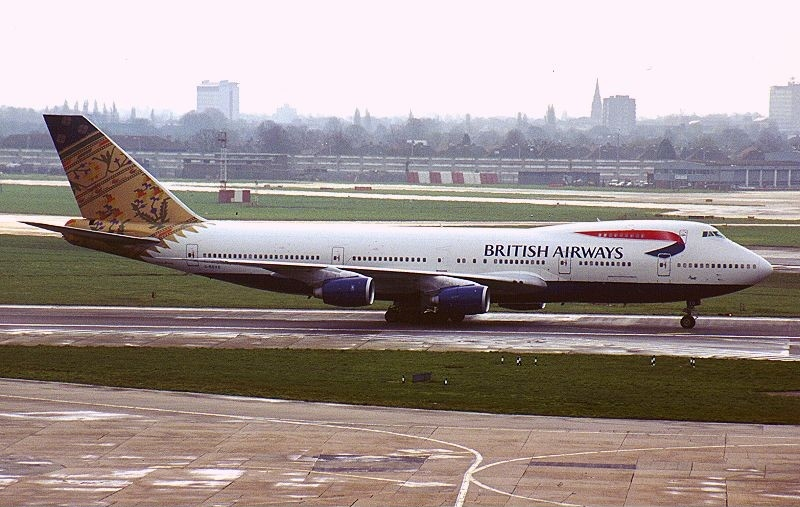
British Airways Boeing 747 with Paithani tail art by Mehta Woven by Mr Shantilal Bhandge.

In the late 1990s, British Airways decided that it would adorn several of its aircraft with one of Mehta's saris woven by Mr.Shantilal Bhandge. BA put the design, with Mehta's signature, on the tailfins of its planes. Mehta commented, "This is even better than having someone wear it."

Many of her brocades and saris have been displayed in museums in the United States, Switzerland and London. Mehta is an invited speaker at museum societies, cultural organizations and as a judge at fashion and design schools including the National Institute of Design, Ahmedabad, her alma mater and NIFT, Mumbai. She also speaks about the history of the sari at NIFT and other colleges. In 2002, she designed a collection of gold jewelry for InterGold which was launched with the World Gold Council.
