= Brocatelle =

Silk-rich fabric with heavy brocade designs

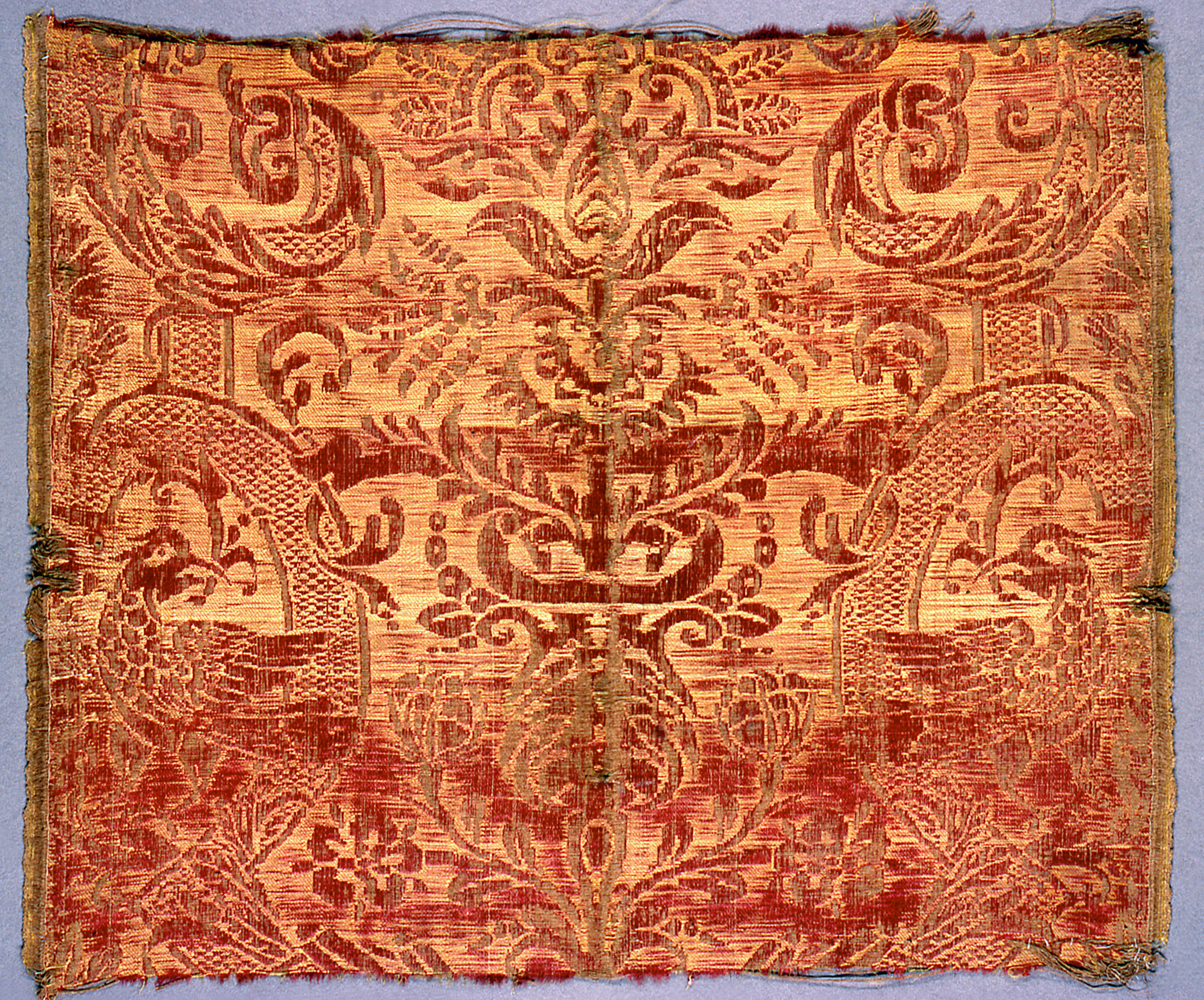
Brocatelle textile fragment

Brocatelle is a silk-rich fabric with heavy brocade designs. The material is characterized by satin effects standing out in relief in the warp against a flat ground. It is produced with jacquard weave by using silk, rayon, cotton, or many synthetic yarns.

== Weave ==
Brocatelle is similar to brocade, but it has figures or patterns looks embossed and stands out in high relief from the background. Brocatelle is a double weave fabric with silk and linen in warp and weft. There are two warp and two weft yarns. The design motifs are formed by weaving the heavy warp yarns in a satin pattern that produces a more pronounced relief effect. Originally it was made by using silk in warp and cotton in weft later changed to other natural and artificial yarns.

== Use ==
Upholstery and drapery.

== See also ==
- Brocade
