= Brocade =

Decorative shuttle-woven fabric

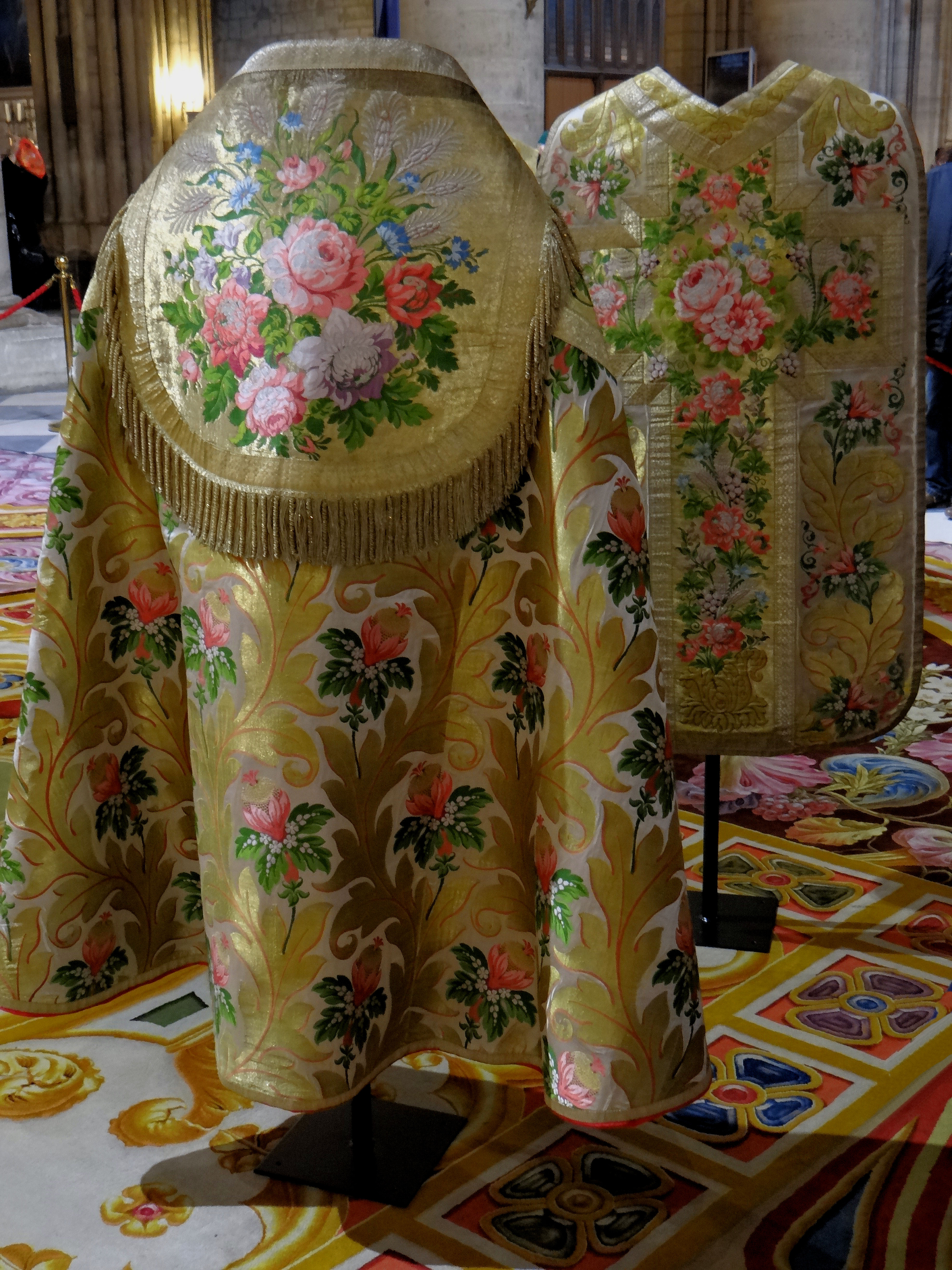
Cope and chasuble; Brocade of Lyon. 19th Century

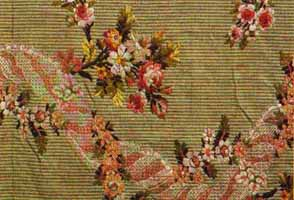
Silk brocade fabric, Lyon, France, 1760–1770.

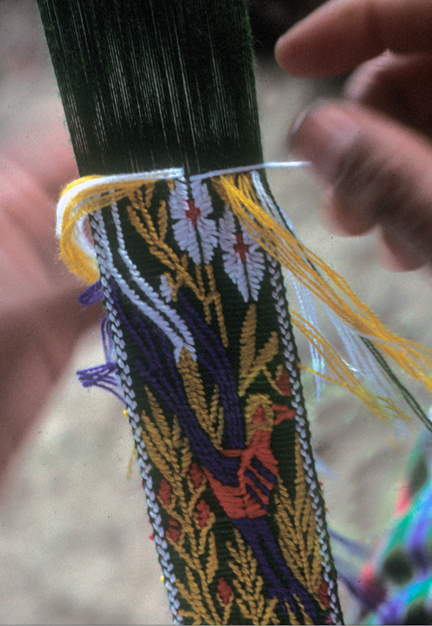
Detail of hair-sash being brocaded on a Jakaltek Maya backstrap loom.

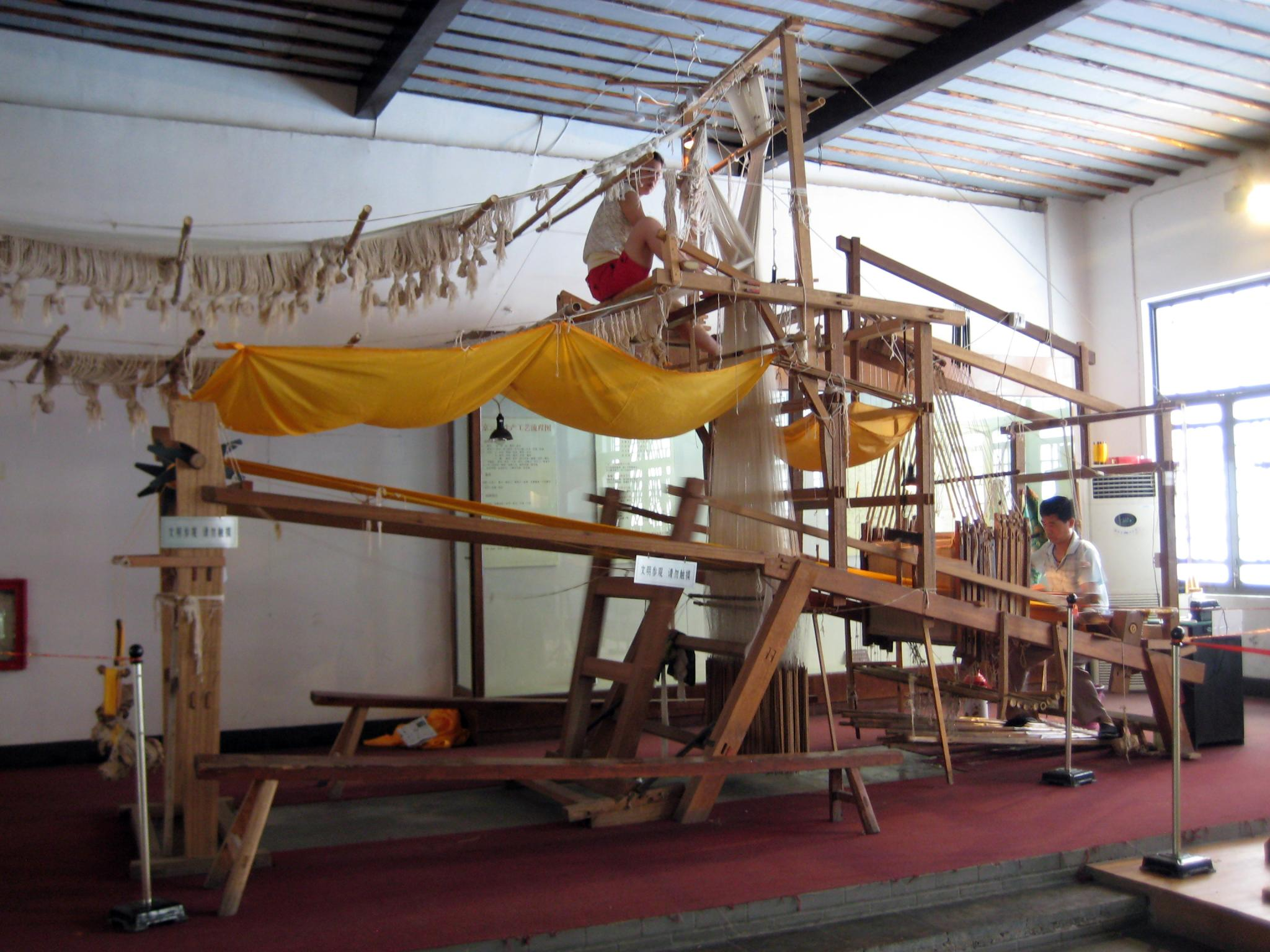
Large Yunjin brocade loom, Nanjing, China, 2010

Brocade (/broʊˈkeɪd/) is a class of richly decorative shuttle-woven fabrics, often made in coloured silks and sometimes with gold and silver threads. The name comes from Italian broccato meaning 'embossed cloth', originally past participle of the verb broccare 'to stud, set with nails', from brocco, 'small nail', from Latin broccus, 'projecting, pointed'.

Brocade is typically woven on a draw loom. It is a supplementary weft technique; that is, the ornamental brocading is produced by a supplementary, non-structural, weft in addition to the standard weft that holds the warp threads together. The purpose of this is to give the appearance that the weave was actually embroidered on.

In Guatemala, brocade is the most popular technique used to decorate fabric woven by Maya weavers on backstrap looms.

Ornamental features in brocade are emphasised and wrought as additions to the main fabric, sometimes stiffening it, though more frequently producing on its face the effect of low relief. In some, but not all, brocades, these additions present a distinctive appearance on the back of the material where the supplementary weft or floating threads of the brocaded or broached parts hang in loose groups or are clipped away. When the weft is floating on the back, this is known as a continuous brocade; the supplementary weft runs from selvage to selvage. The yarns are cut away in cutwork and broché. Also, a discontinuous brocade is where the supplementary yarn is only woven in the patterned areas.

== History ==
=== China ===
The manufacture of brocade began during the Warring States period of China. Many products of brocade have been found in tombs of the era. Several distinct styles of brocade have been developed in China, the most famous being Yunjin (Cloud brocade) of Nanjing, Song brocade of Suzhou, and Shu brocade of Chengdu.

=== Southeast Asia ===
Songket is a type of brocade in the Malay world (Indonesia, Malaysia, Singapore, Brunei etc.)

=== Byzantium ===
Dating back to the Middle Ages, brocade fabric was one of the few luxury fabrics worn by nobility throughout China, India, Persia, Greece, Japan, Korea and Byzantium. Brocades woven by the Byzantines were an especially desirable fabric. From the 4th to the 6th centuries, production of silk was seemingly non-existent, as linen and wool were the predominant fabrics. During this period, there was no public knowledge of silk fabric production except for that which was kept secret by the Chinese. Over the years, knowledge of silk production became known among other cultures and spread westward. As silk production became known to Western cultures, trade from the East began to decrease. It was discovered by Byzantine historians that in the 6th century a pair of monks brought the secret of sericulture – silk production – to the Byzantine emperor. As a result, Western cultures were able to learn how to breed, raise, and feed silkworms. From this point until the 9th century, Byzantium became the biggest and most central producer for all of the Western world in the production of all types of silk motifs, including brocades, damasks, brocatelles and tapestry-like fabrics.

During the Early Middle Ages, brocade fabrics were available only to the wealthiest of people as the Byzantine emperor charged extreme prices for the fabric. The designs woven into brocade fabrics were often Persian in origin. It was also common to see Christian subjects depicted in the complex weaves of the fabric. When these luxurious fabrics were made into clothing or wall hangings, they were at times adorned with precious and semiprecious stones, small medallions of enamel, embroidery and appliqués.

=== The Late Middle Ages ===
Wealthy noblemen and noblewomen dressed in silk brocades from Italy, and velvets trimmed with fur from Germany. During the 14th and 15th centuries, the Court of Burgundy was made known for their continuous fashionable tastes and luxurious dress.

=== Renaissance Italy ===
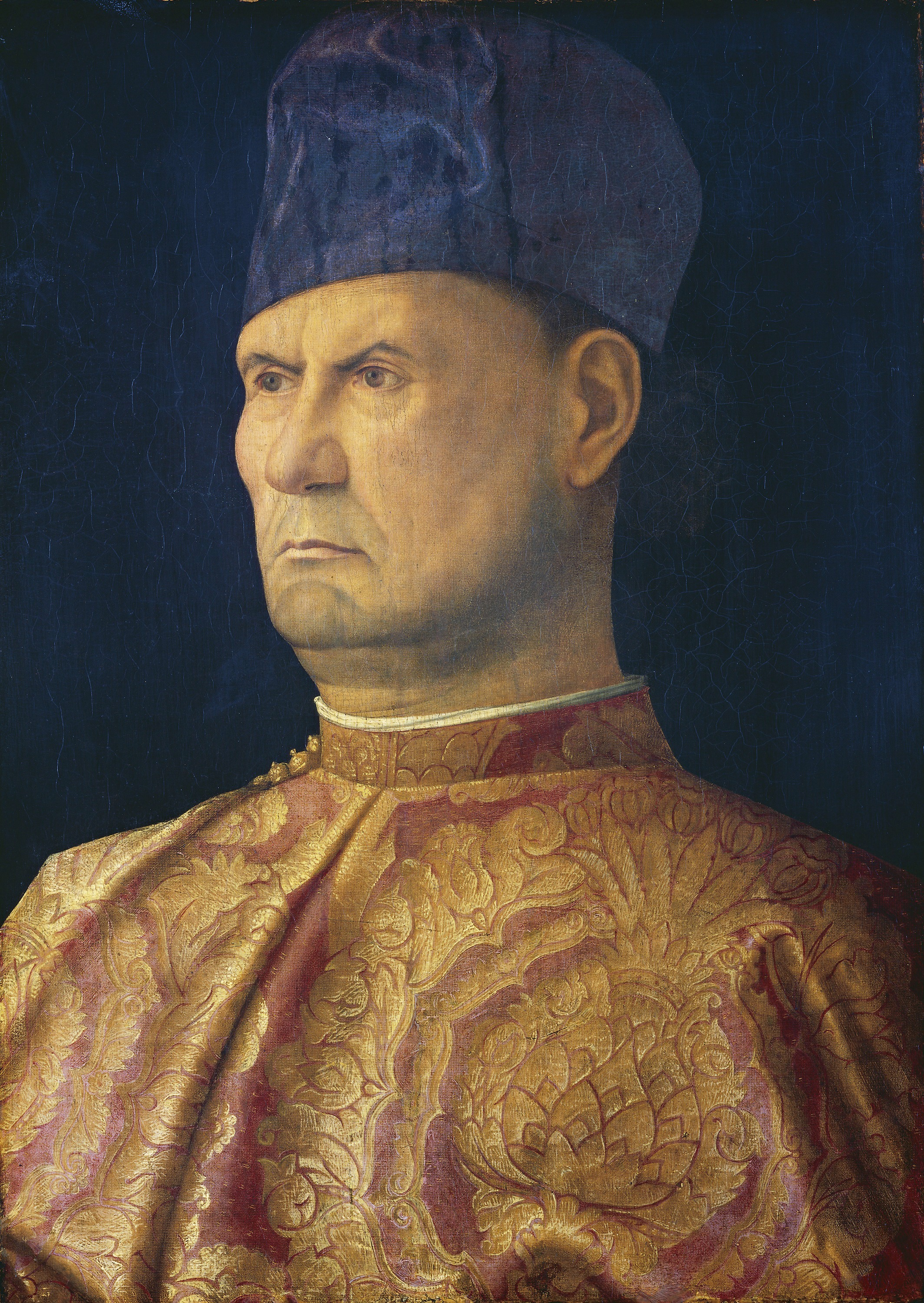
The condotier by Italian Renaissance painter Giovanni Bellini

Brocades were also an important fabric during the Renaissance, and especially the Italian Renaissance. As wool and silk were the primary fabrics used by Europeans during the Renaissance, and despite the lack of documentary evidence, it is said that due to the increase in complexity of decoration of Italian silk fabrics of the 15th century, there must have been improvements in silk-weaving looms around this time. The complexity and high quality of luxurious silk fabrics caused Italy to become the most important and superior manufacturer of the finest silk fabrics for all of Europe. The almost sculptural lines of the fashions during the Renaissance were paired perfectly with the exquisite beauty and elegance of brocade, damask, and other superior silk textiles.

== Modern uses ==
Brocade fabrics are currently used mostly for upholstery and draperies. They are also used for evening and formal clothing, for vestments, as well as for costumes. In India, Banarasi brocade is extensively used in decorating Banarasi saris, dresses, and dupattas. The use of precious and semi-precious stones in the adornment of brocades is not common, but has been replaced by the use of sequins and beading. Brocade fabrics are now largely woven on a Jacquard loom that is able to create many complex tapestry-like designs using the Jacquard technique. Although many brocade fabrics look like tapestries and are advertised in some fashion promotions as such, they are not to be confused with true tapestries. Patterns such as brocade, brocatelle, damask and tapestry-like fabrics are known as jacquard patterns.

== Gallery ==
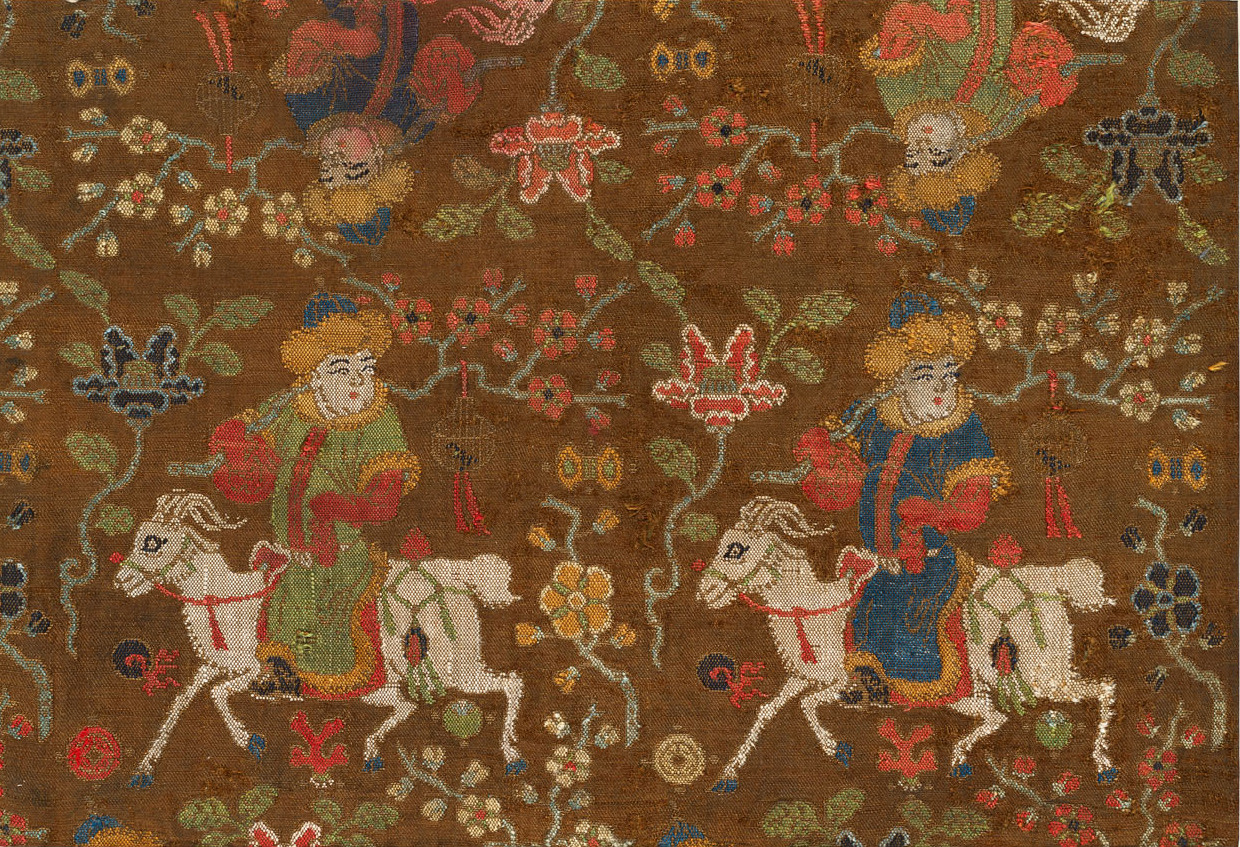
Silk brocade (detail), Boys riding goats. Ming dynasty, 15th/16th century.

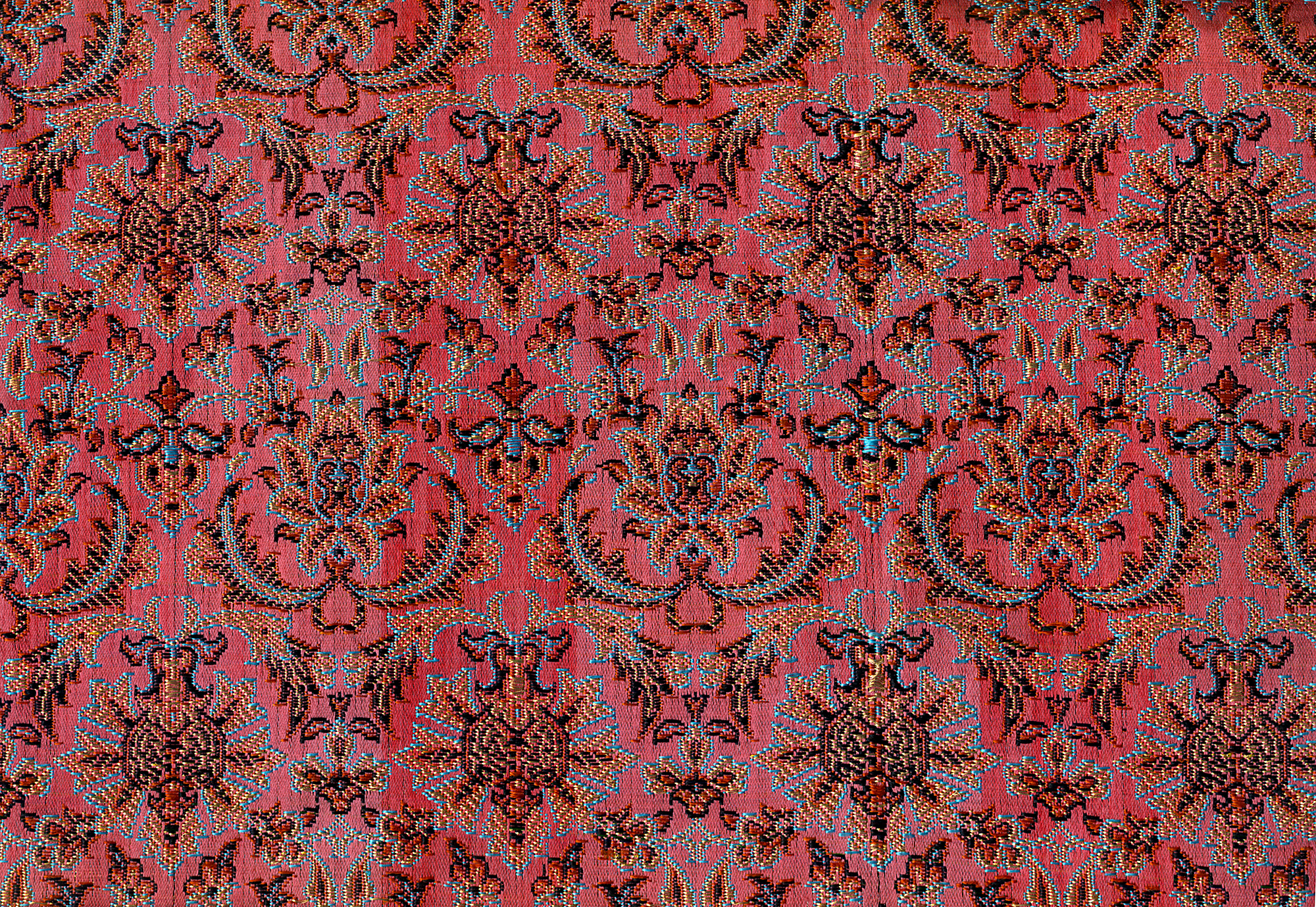
Persian Silk Brocade. Brocade weaver: Seyyed Hossein Mozhgani, 1974, Ministry of Culture and Art, Iran.

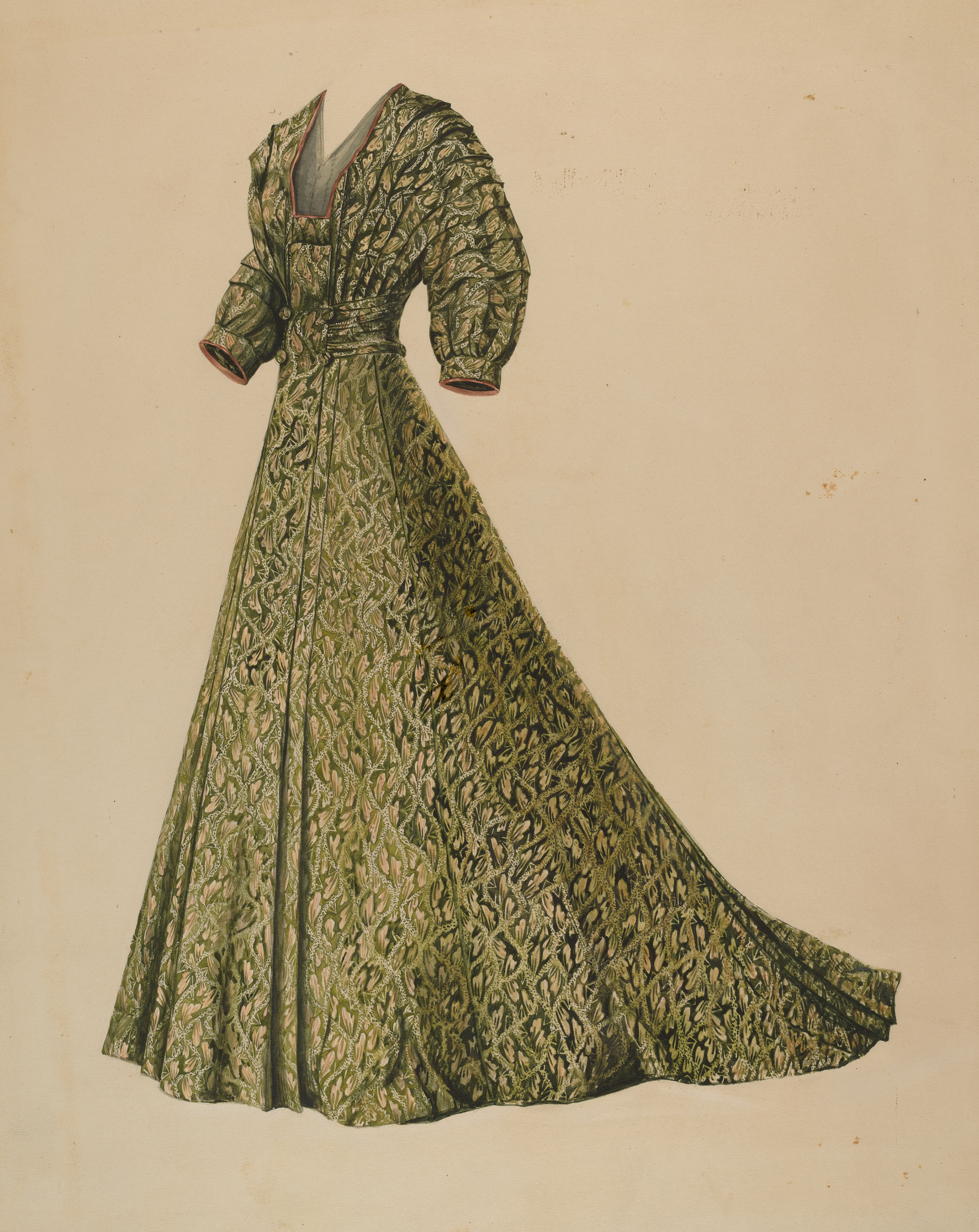
Isabelle De Strange, Brocade Costume, c. 1938, NGA 13643

== See also ==
- Acca cloth
- Banarasi sari
- Brocatelle
- Embroidery
- Meera Mehta
- Songket
- Zari
