= Cabinet Room (White House) =

Meeting room for the Cabinet of the United States

- The Cabinet Room in 2022
- Interactive map of Cabinet Room
- 38.8974°N 77.0374°W
- Location: 1600 Pennsylvania Avenue, Washington D.C., United States

Site notes
- Governing body: National Park Service

U.S. National Monument
- Designated: November 5, 2026
- Part of: Oval Office National Monument

U.S. National Historic Landmark
- Designated: December 19, 1960
- Part of: The White House

D.C. Inventory of Historic Sites
- Designated: November 8, 1964
- Part of: The White House
- Reference no.: 63

The Cabinet Room is the meeting room for the officials and advisors to the president of the United States who constitute the Cabinet of the United States. The room is located in the West Wing of the White House, near the Oval Office, and looks out upon the White House Rose Garden. While primary used for meetings of the cabinet, the room has also hosted meetings between the president and visiting foreign heads of states, governments, their delegations, and/or other representatives of foreign nations and members of both houses of the United States Congress. The room has also been used occasionally by presidents to address the nation on policy matters, informal press conferences right before meetings that take place, and for interviews.

== History ==
Completed in 1934, the room was built primarily in the Georgian revival style. The neoclassical ceiling molding with triglyphs was installed in 1934.

The first presidential inauguration of Harry S. Truman as the 33rd president was held at 7:00 pm on Thursday, April 12, 1945, in the Cabinet Room, soon after the death of Franklin Roosevelt.

In 2006, the room was refurbished somewhat similarly to its appearance during the administration of Franklin Roosevelt when the West Wing and current Cabinet Room were largely rebuilt following damage from a fire at the end of Herbert Hoover's administration. This includes Art Deco style wall sconces with spread eagles supporting internally lit globes. Three overhead Moderne style glass pendant lights were recreated from old photographs and a similar surviving example in a hallway between the Oval Office and Roosevelt Room. The room is painted an off-white color called deauville. A custom-made carpet, in shades of carmine, old gold, sapphire, and fern green with a pattern of overscaled stars and olive leaves was woven for the room. The refurbishment of White House rooms is jointly undertaken by the curator of the White House, the Committee for the Preservation of the White House, and the White House Historical Association. Costs relating to construction are often funded by the White House Endowment Trust. The purchase of fine art, historic furniture, or the recreation of period decorative arts is frequently paid for by the White House Acquisition Trust.

On November 5, 2026, President Donald Trump designated the Oval Office, the outer Oval Office, and the Cabinet Room as the Oval Office National Monument under the National Park Service by a presidential proclamation.

== Decoration ==
The President's chair with the date of January 20, 2021 reflecting the inauguration of Joe Biden and the start of his presidency seen on October 19, 2021.

A series of French doors topped with arched lunette windows are located on the east side of the room. A fireplace, flanked by two niches is located on the north side of the room. Busts of George Washington and Benjamin Franklin by Jean-Antoine Houdon fill the niches. Above the mantel hangs a painting titled The Signing of the Declaration of Independence by Charles Édouard Armand-Dumaresq, (French, 1826–1895). Additional portraits along the west wall are chosen by an incumbent president.

The large elliptical mahogany table was a gift from President Richard Nixon in 1970. The president and the cabinet secretaries' chairs are copies of a late-eighteenth century design. The president's chair is centered on the table on the east side of the room. The back of the president's chair is two inches taller than the cabinet secretaries. Engraved brass plates with the names of the cabinet positions are attached to the back of the chairs. The president's chair simply says "THE PRESIDENT." The chairs may be purchased by the cabinet members upon leaving office, in case they wish to keep the chair as a souvenir. Some cabinet members have had their chairs returned to the cabinet room for several positions and administrations.

== Gallery ==
The room as it appeared in 1902.

The empty cabinet room between the years of 1909 and 1932.

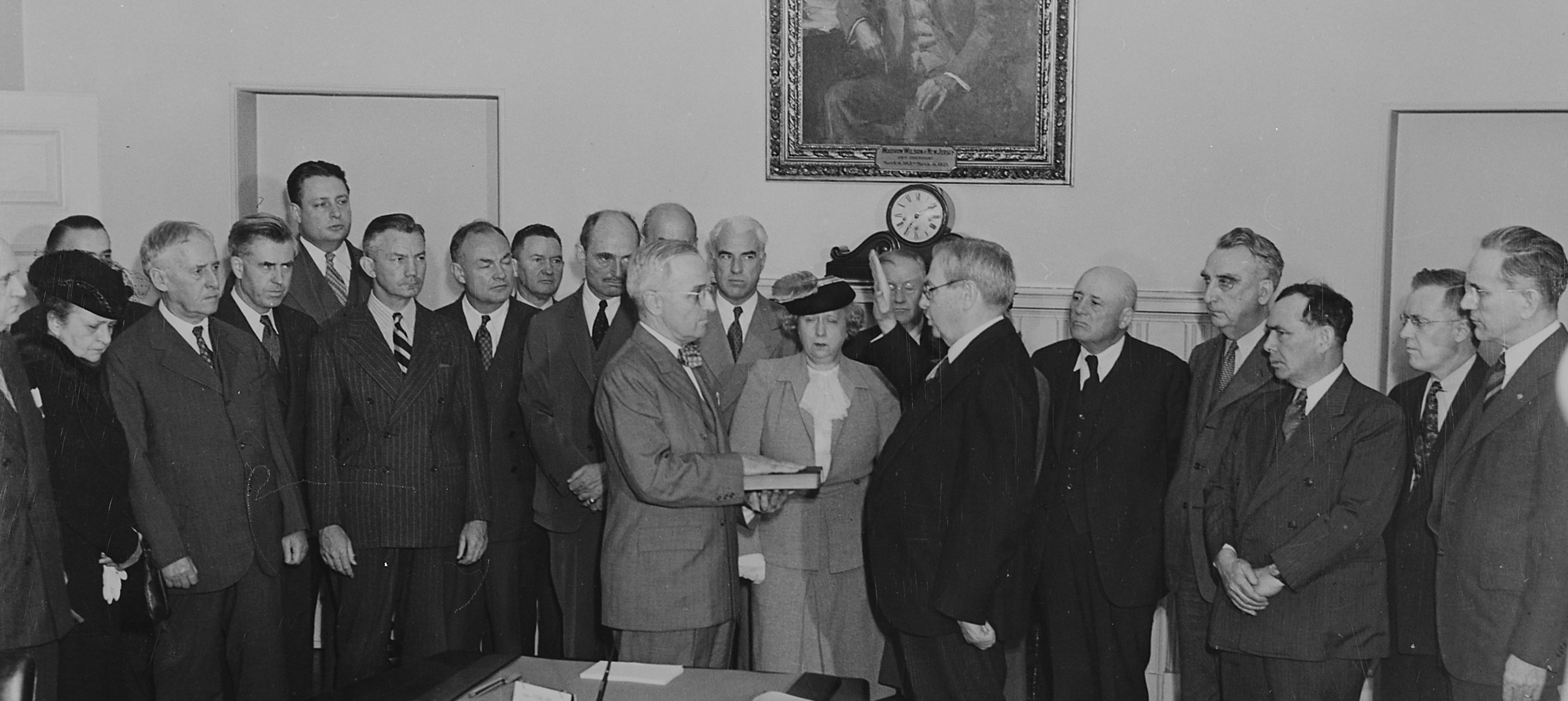
Harry Truman taking the oath of office as president, April 12, 1945.

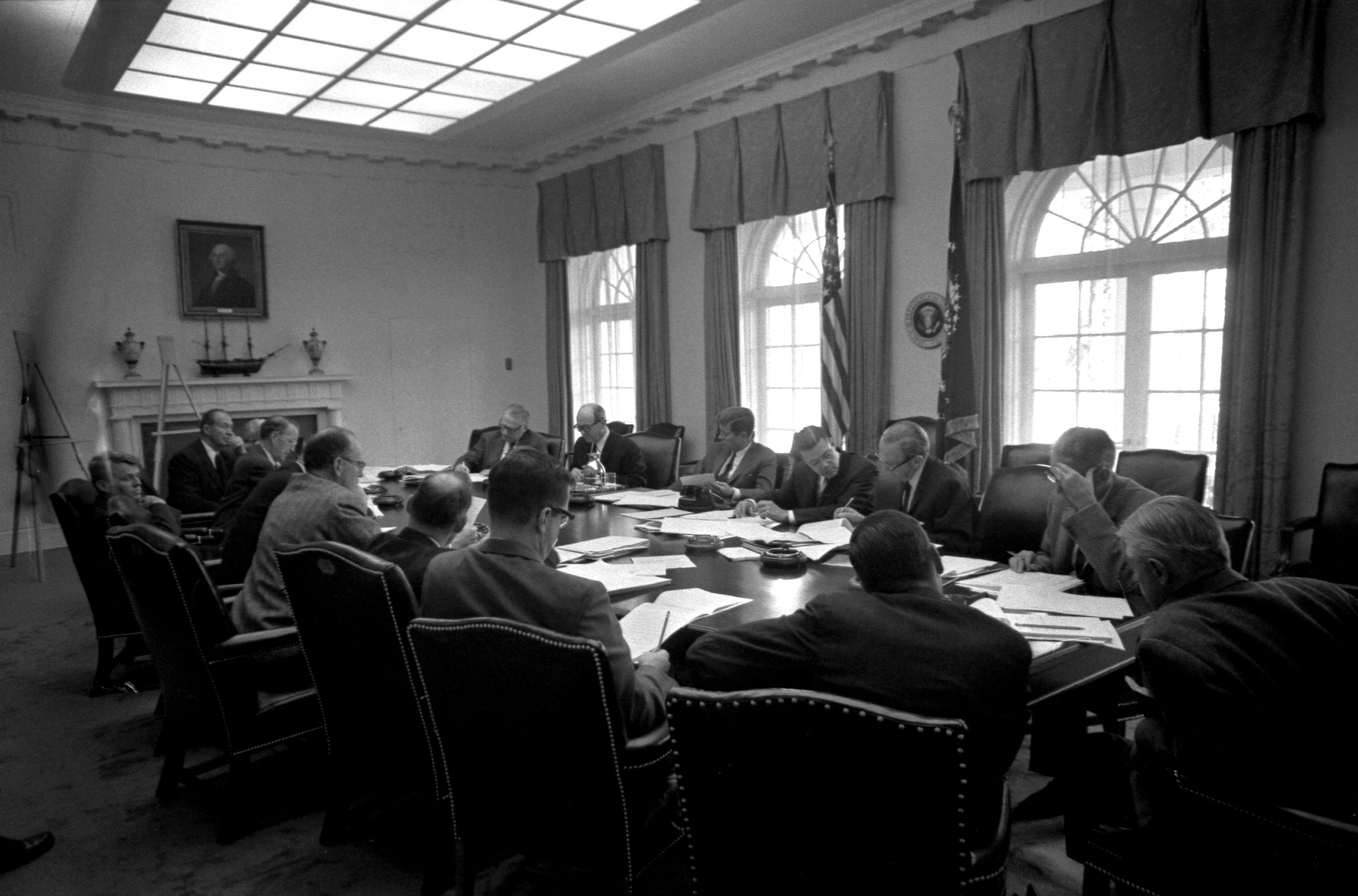
President John F. Kennedy meeting with the cabinet during the Cuban Missile Crisis, October 29, 1962.

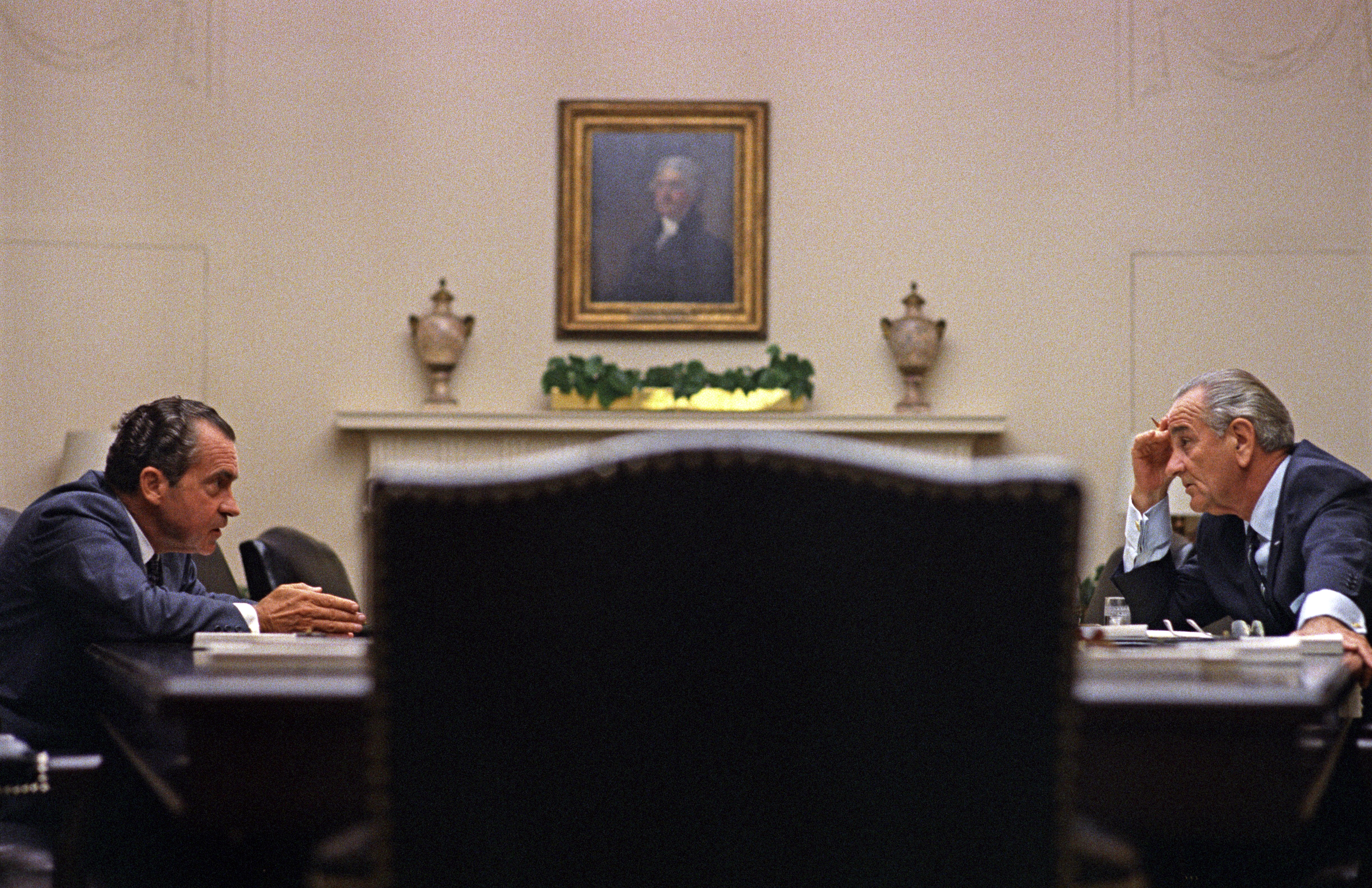
President Lyndon B. Johnson meeting with then-presidential candidate Richard Nixon, July 26, 1968.

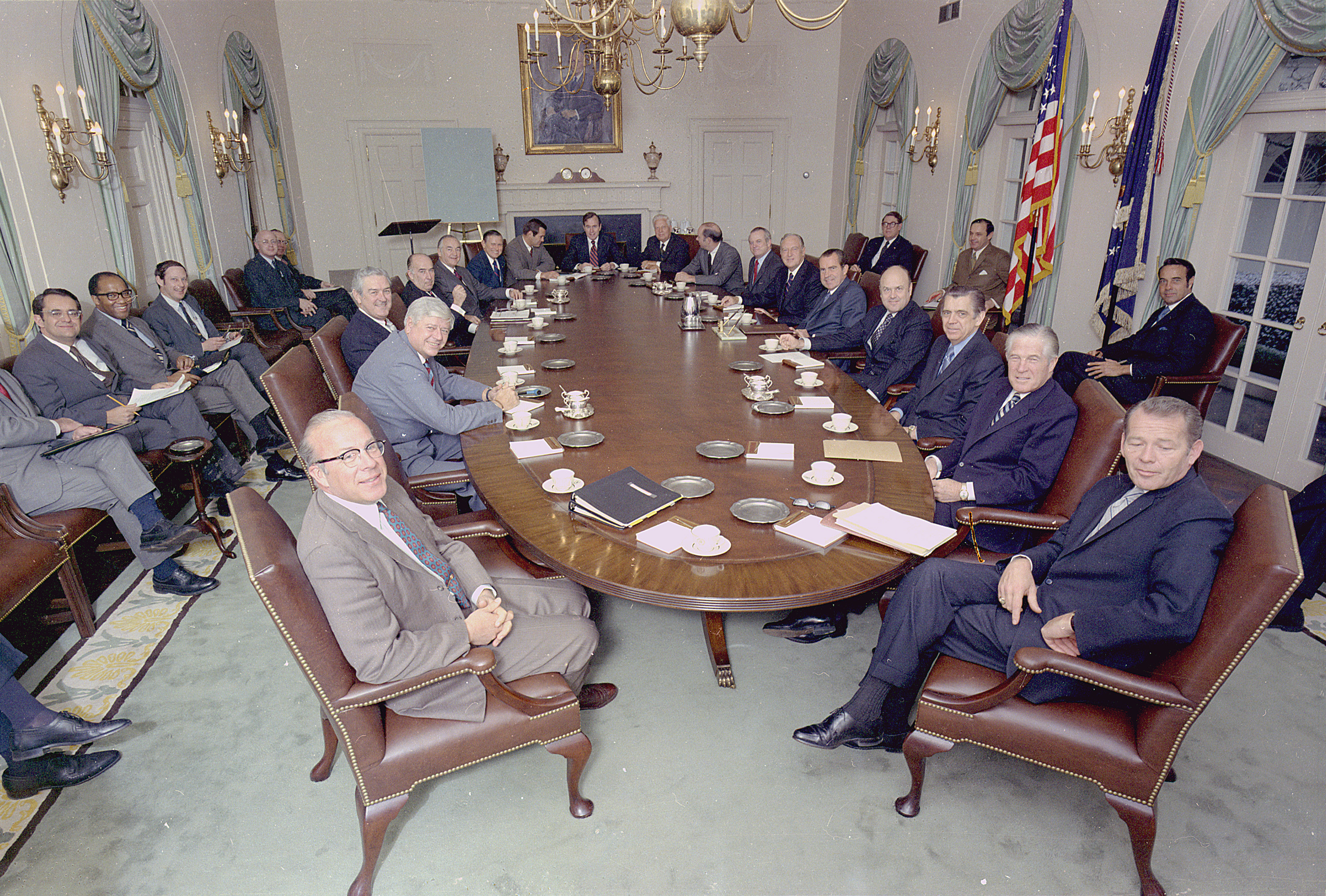
President Nixon with his cabinet, March 26, 1971.

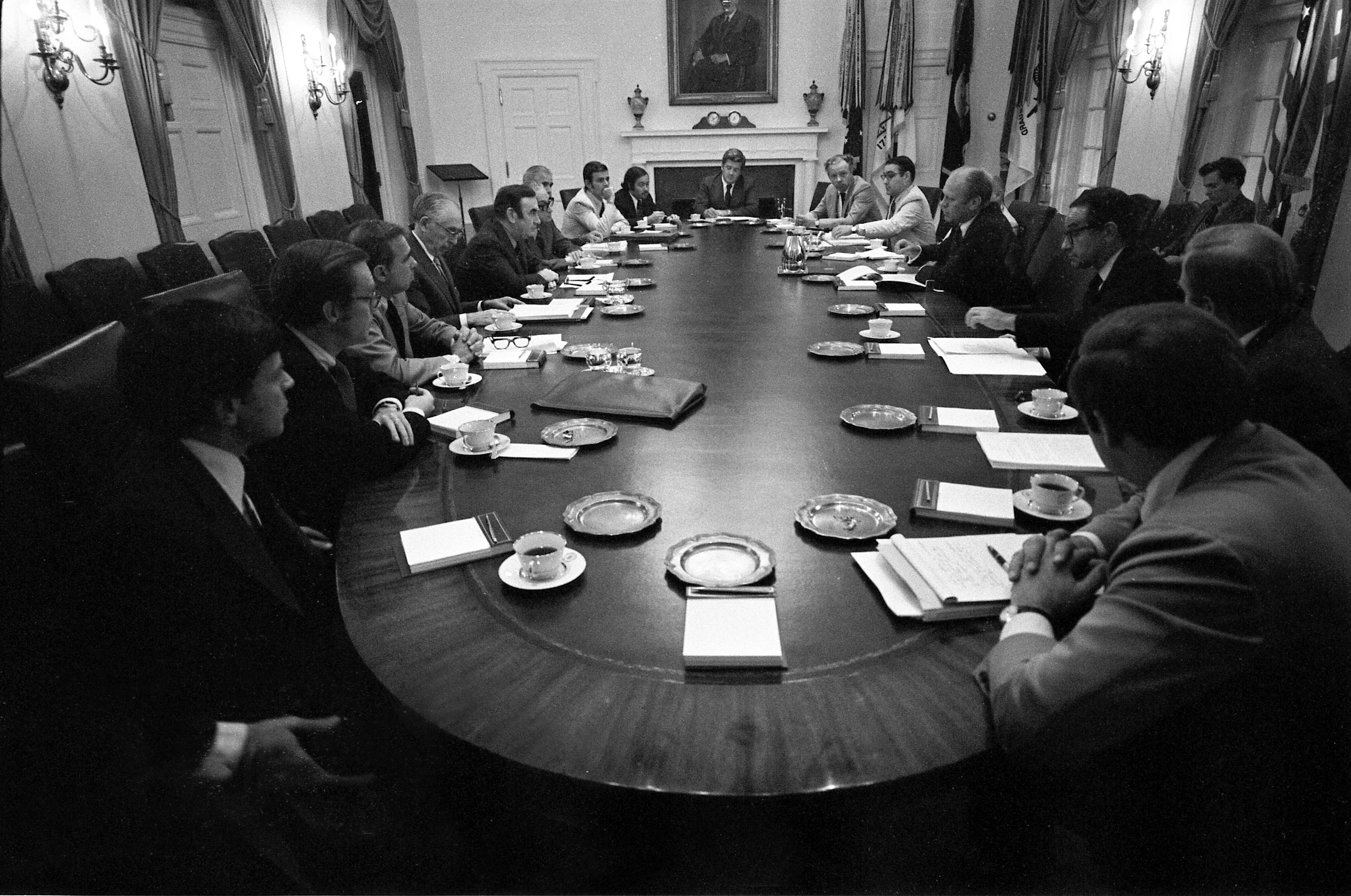
President Gerald Ford and the cabinet meeting with New York Governor Hugh Carey discussing the 1975 New York City fiscal crisis, September 2, 1975.

President Jimmy Carter during a cabinet meeting, July 12, 1978.

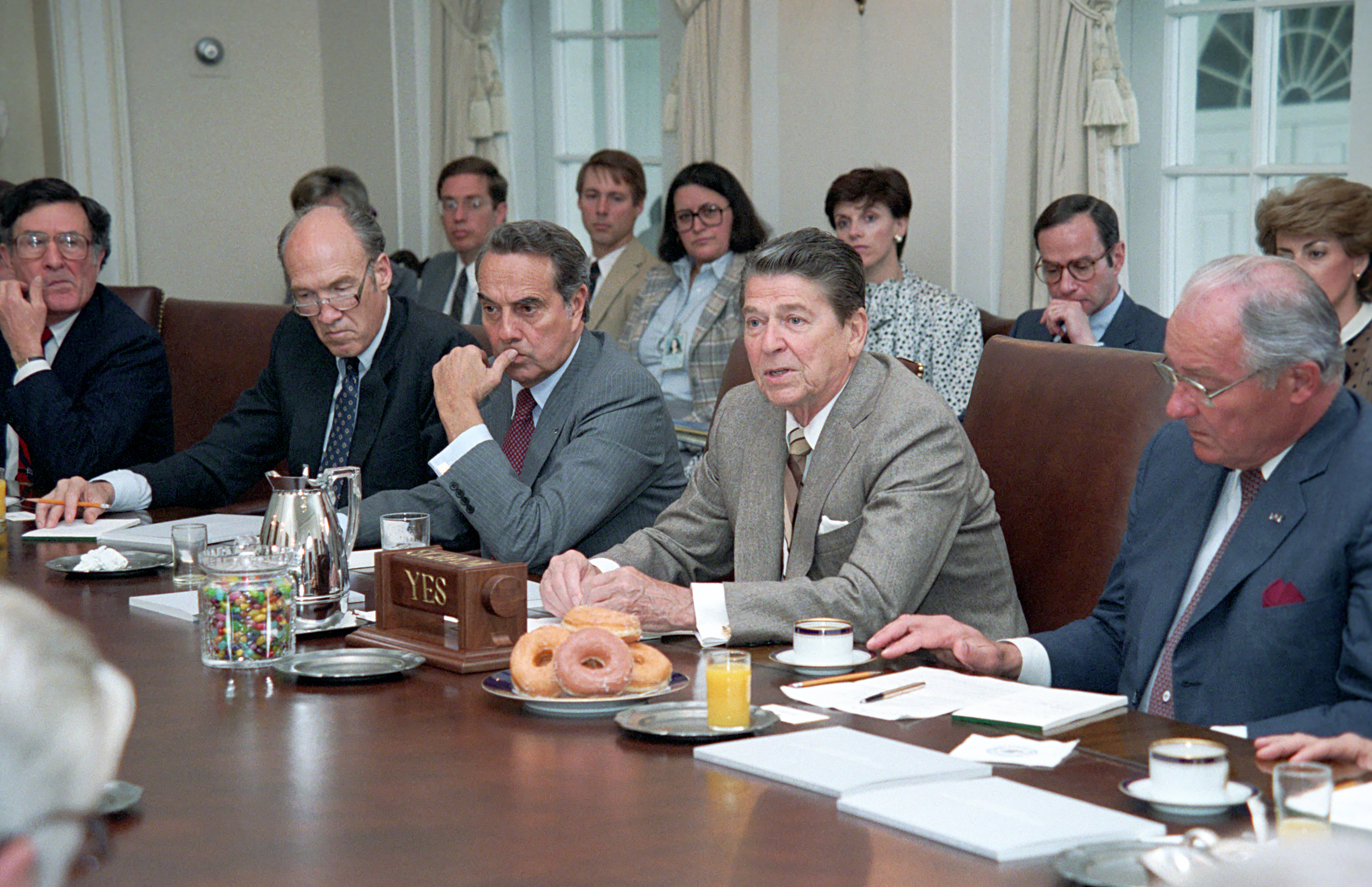
President Ronald Reagan with Republican Congressional Leadership with Representative Robert H. Michel, and Senators Bob Dole and Alan Simpson, April 16, 1985.

President George H. W. Bush during a cabinet meeting, September 5, 1989.

Prime Minister of Canada Brian Mulroney signing the guest book in the Cabinet Room on June 2, 1993.

President Bill Clinton participates in budget negotiations with Speaker of the United States House of Representatives Newt Gingrich during the 1995–1996 United States federal government shutdowns. Senator Bob Dole is seated next to President Clinton.

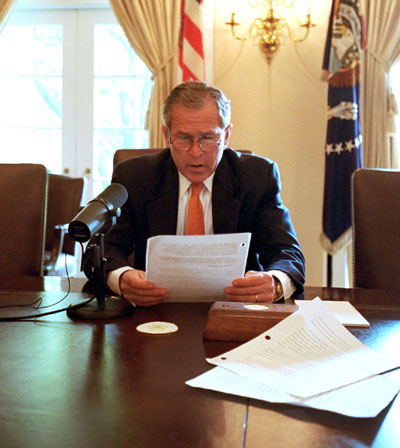
President George W. Bush addressing the country during the Weekly Radio Address, May 5, 2001.

President Barack Obama addressing the nation on the Paris Agreement, December 12, 2015.

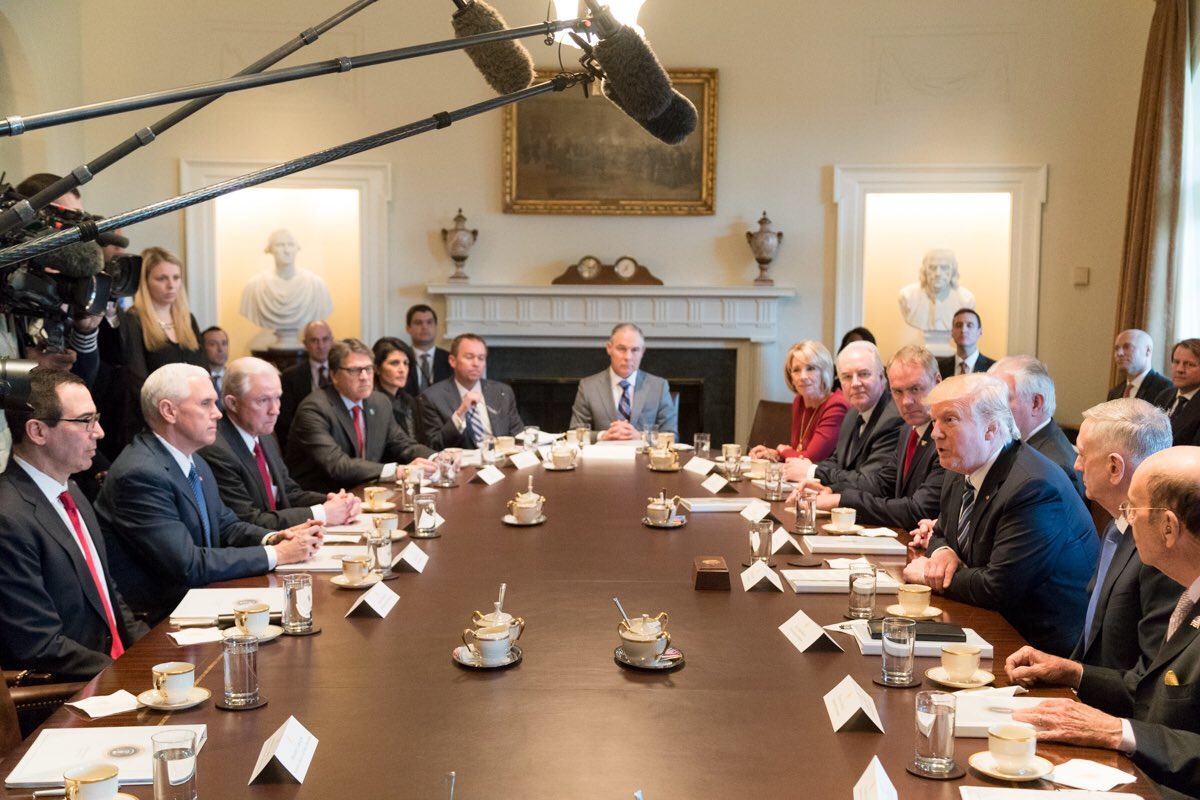
President Trump with Vice President Mike Pence during a cabinet meeting, March 13, 2017.

President Joe Biden holds a Cabinet meeting with Vice President Kamala Harris, June 6, 2023.

President Donald Trump hosting a bilateral lunch meeting with Ukrainian President Volodymyr Zelenskyy in the Cabinet Room, October 17, 2025.

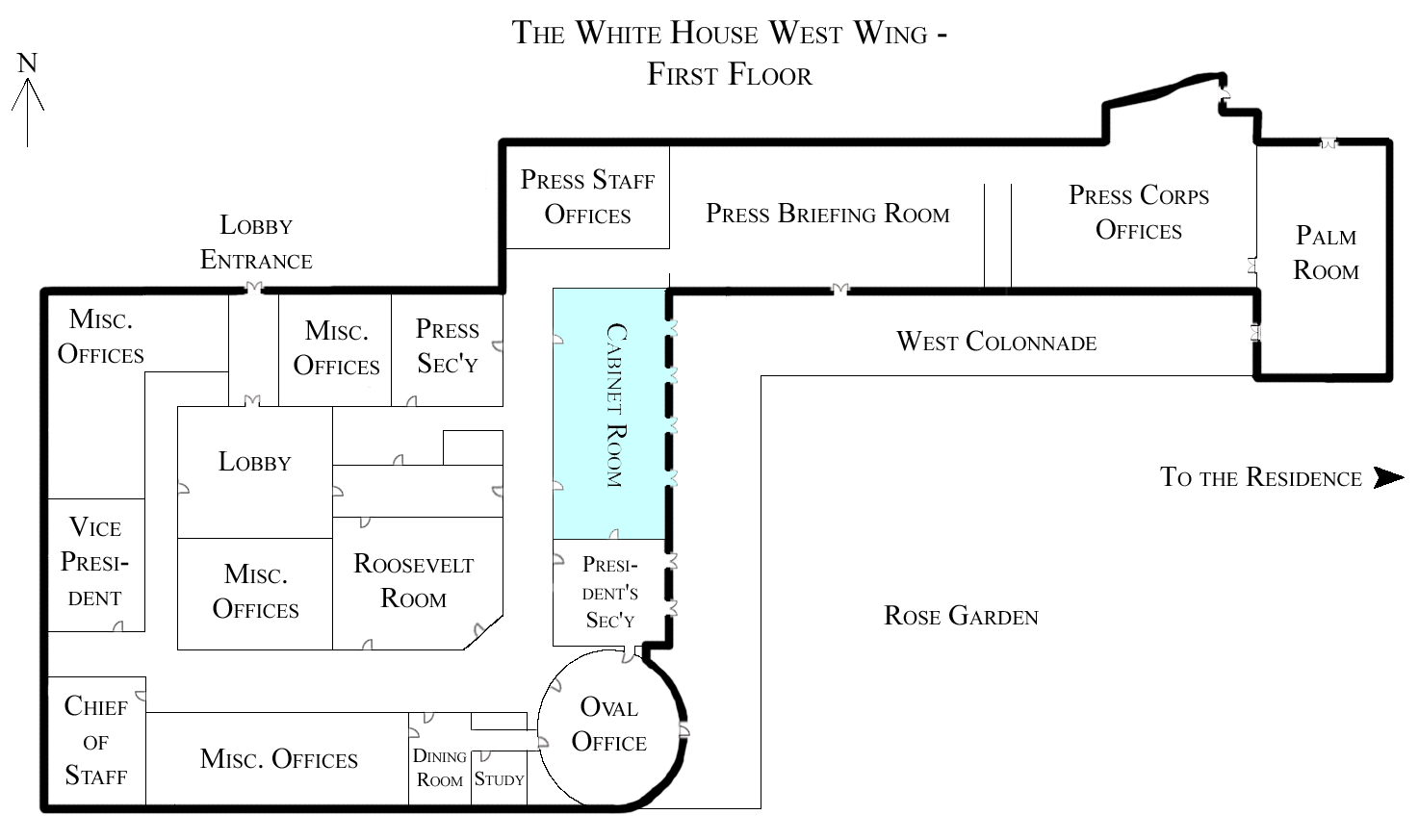
Plan of the first (ground) floor of the White House; the Cabinet Room is visible at center.

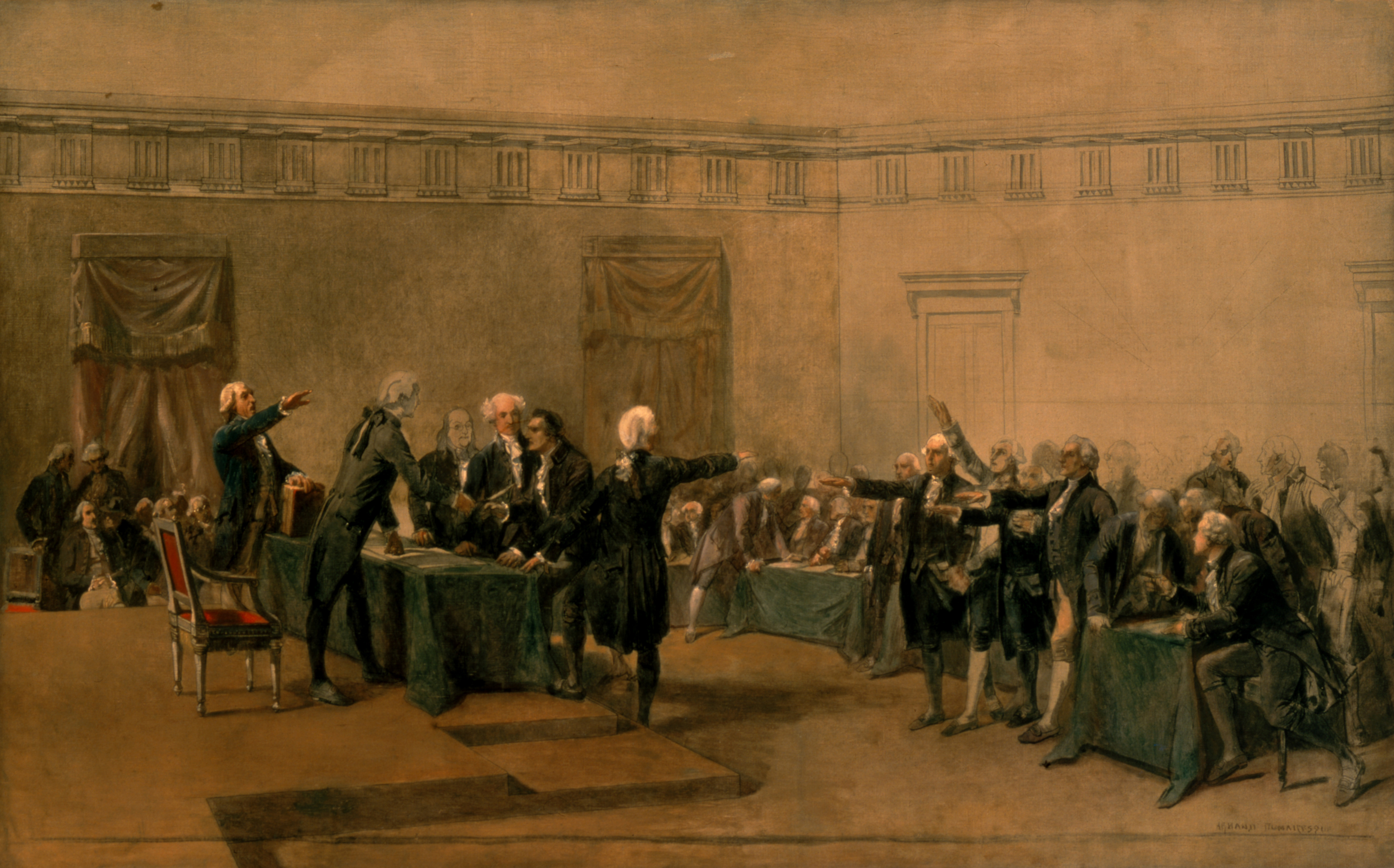
The Declaration of Independence of the United States of America, July 4, 1776, c. 1873 by Charles Édouard Armand-Dumaresq, has been on display in the Cabinet Room since the late-1980s.

The Vice President's chair with the date of January 20, 2021 reflecting the start of the Vice presidency of Kamala Harris seen on July 14, 2021.

President Clinton in an interview with Israeli media, September 28, 1995

Video about the Cabinet Room and the Cabinet
