= The People's House: A White House Experience =

Museum in Washington D.C.

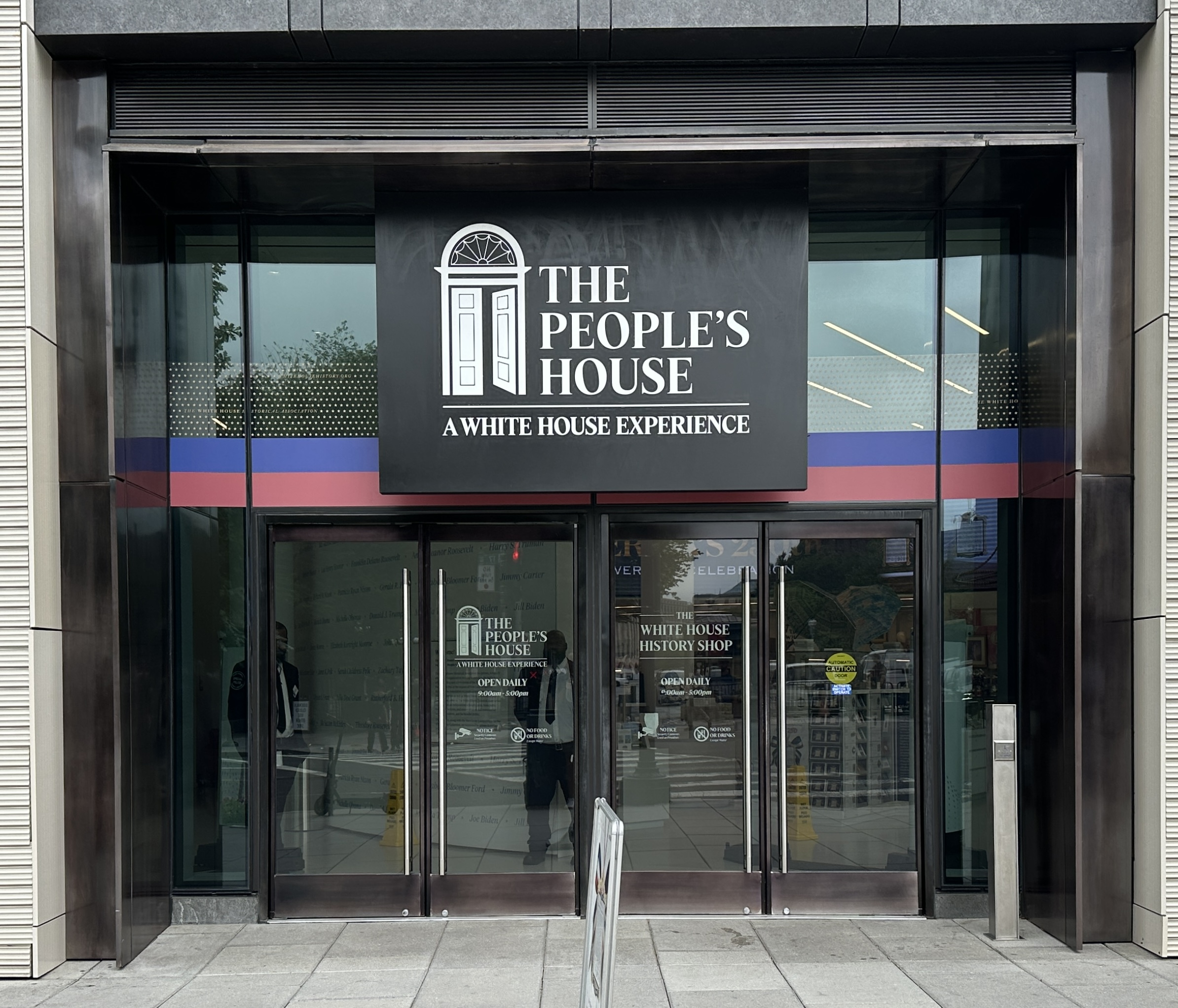
- Entrance to the museum
- Established: 2024
- Location: 1700 Pennsylvania Avenue NW; Washington, D.C., U.S.
- Owner: White House Historical Association
- Website: thepeopleshouse.org

The People's House: A White House Experience is a museum in Washington, D.C. opened in 2024 by the White House Historical Association. The museum is located on Pennsylvania Avenue, across the street from the Eisenhower Executive Office Building. The goal is to preserve White House history and provide the public with a glimpse into the workings of the building. Admission is free and it is open seven days a week. It includes a variety of interactive exhibits as well as replicas of the White House south facade and Oval Office.

== History ==
The White House Historical Association (WHHA) is a nonprofit organization founded in 1961 by First Lady Jacqueline Kennedy which aims to preserve the historic integrity of the White House and educate people about the building's history. During a November 2023 gala at the Metropolitan Museum of Art, First Lady Jill Biden announced that the WHHA would open an interactive museum the following year. Biden told attendees "At its core, this project is about education — teaching our students about our country's origins, bringing to life the countless people who shape it and who made the White House into the beating heart of our democracy."

WHHA president Stewart McLaurin said he wanted to give the public a better chance at exploring each space in the building, telling reporters "When you have a tour of the White House, as wonderful as that is, because it is a working home and office, those are rather limited and you go through and you see the spaces and you have the experience of being there. But you're not able to linger there to really understand what happened in this space."

The WHHA signed a 25-year lease for the museum space in an existing office building located at 1700 Pennsylvania Avenue NW, one block from the White House. The cost to open the museum measuring 33,000 square feet (3,100 m^{2}) on three floors was $35 million and an additional $50 million was raised for an endowment, all of which was privately funded.

Financial donors included billionaires David Rubenstein and Jacqueline Mars, in addition to corporations including Lockheed Martin and Apple Inc. Much of the equipment used in the museum's interactive exhibits was donated by Panasonic. The Gensler architectural firm was selected to renovate the museum space, the same firm which completed a renovation of the building in 2022, and Ralph Appelbaum Associates designed the exhibits. The museum opened on September 23, 2024. Admission is free and the museum is open seven days a week.

== Exhibits ==
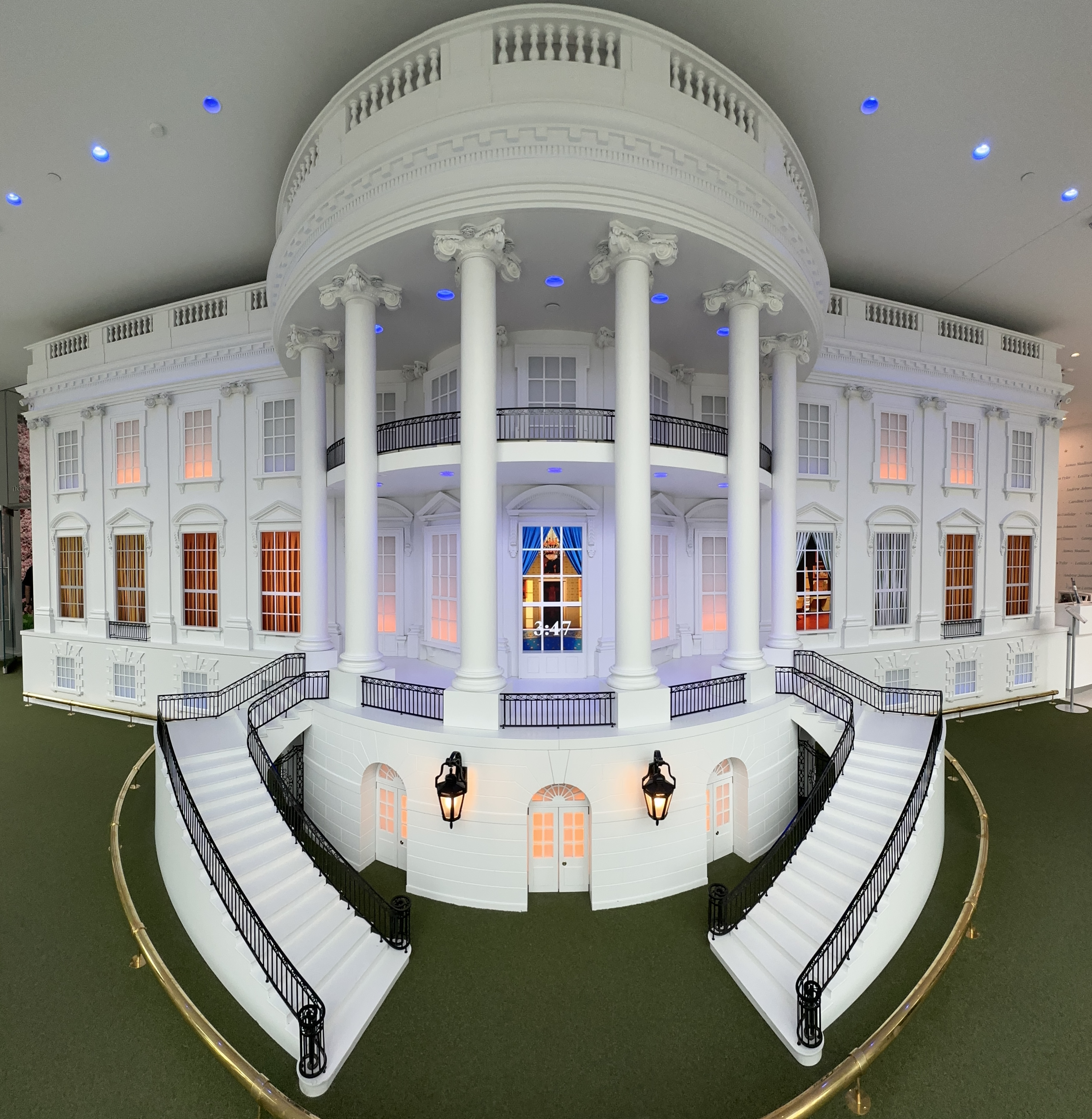
The first feature visitors see in the museum is a 1:5 replica of the White House's south facade.

The museum features interactive exhibits on the ground floor and second floor, with lecture space and classrooms on the third floor reserved for students and other groups. According to reporter Roxanne Roberts from The Washington Post, "if a video game and a history museum had a baby, it would be the People's House." The first feature visitors see is a 1:5 replica of the White House's south facade with various projections and displays, including a digital overlay of the 1814 fire that gutted the building. Behind the replica projections show the White House's interior space. Visitors can touch a screen that gives information on each room and certain events that took place there. For instance, a projection on the Red Room shows the swearing-in of President Rutherford B. Hayes.

The next space visitors see on the first floor is a room where projections change the setting every five minutes to various rooms in the White House, including the Red Room, Blue Room, Green Room, East Room, and State Dining Room. Information about objects in the room will show up on the wall if a visitor hovers their hand over it. One of the main features of the museum is an almost exact recreation of the Oval Office which includes replicas of the furnishings chosen by the sitting president. Visitors can sit in the chair behind a Resolute desk replica or sit in chairs by a replica of the fireplace where presidents often pose with visiting dignitaries.

Upon entering the second floor there is a room with interactive touchscreens giving information on each president and first lady. There are also videos of White House staff, including cooks and ushers, sharing their experience working in the executive mansion. Another room features an interactive recreation of the Cabinet Room. There are videos of presidents holding meetings about the Civil War, the Great Depression, and Cuban Missile Crisis. Visitors can vote on different scenarios discussed during these meetings. The next room includes 360° projections of a state dinner and visitors can sit at a table with glued-down silverware. A recreation of the White House Family Theater includes trivia questions displayed on the screen. Visitors can select their answers from buttons at each seat.

Displayed on the second floor is a four-paneled 1943 artwork by Norman Rockwell called So You Want to See the President!, which was purchased in 2025 after having hung in the West Wing for more than 40 years. The last space on the second floor is called "Stories in Objects" which features 32 interactive objects related to the White House, all painted white. These objects include a model of the presidential state car known as "the Beast" and a replica of the block of cheese weighing 1,400 pounds (640 kg) that President Andrew Jackson served in 1837. The room also includes views of the Eisenhower Executive Office Building and Pennsylvania Avenue. The tour ends through a gift shop measuring 1,500 square feet (140 m^{2}).

== Gallery ==
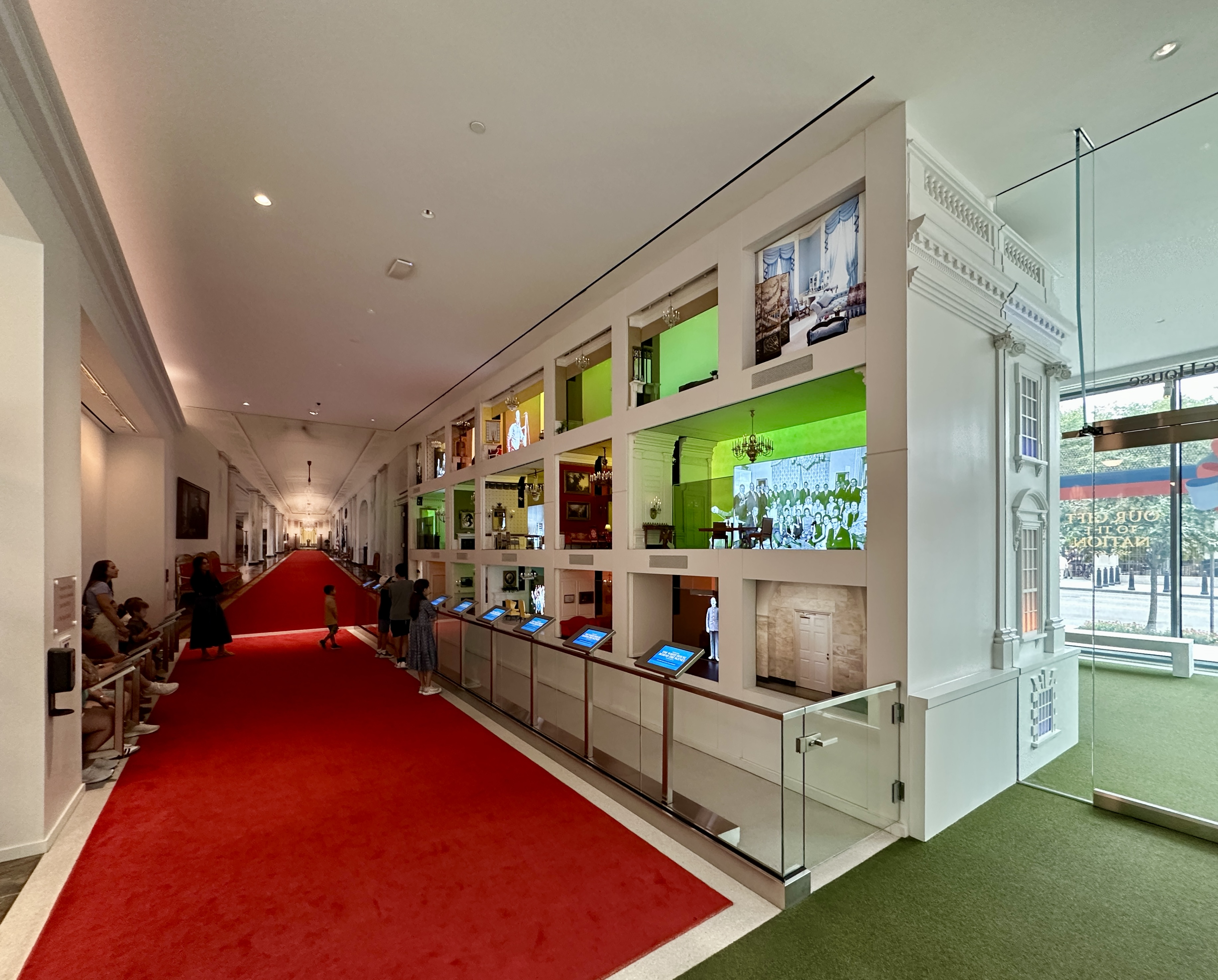
Projections show the White House's interior space

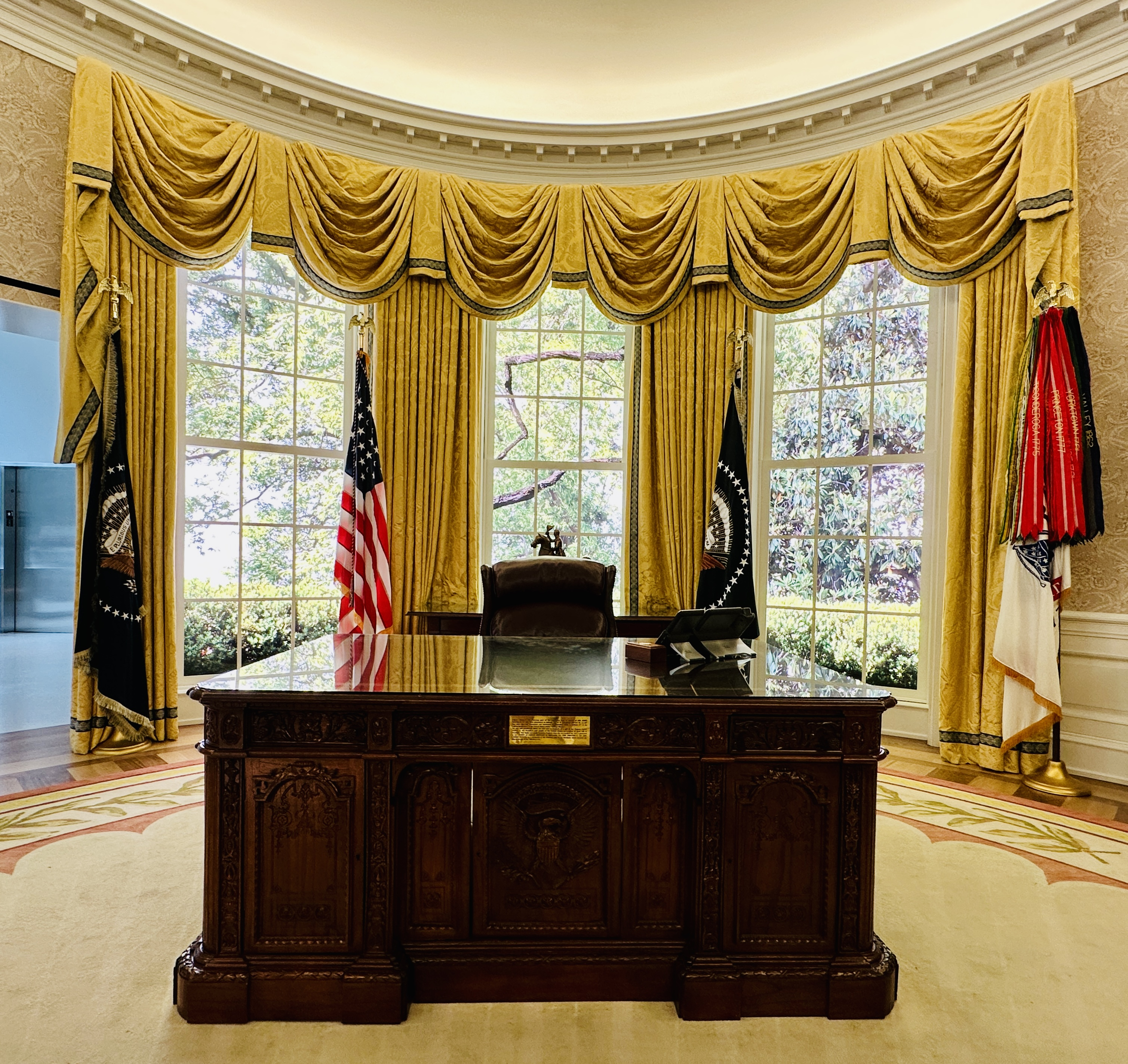
Replica of the Resolute desk and Oval Office

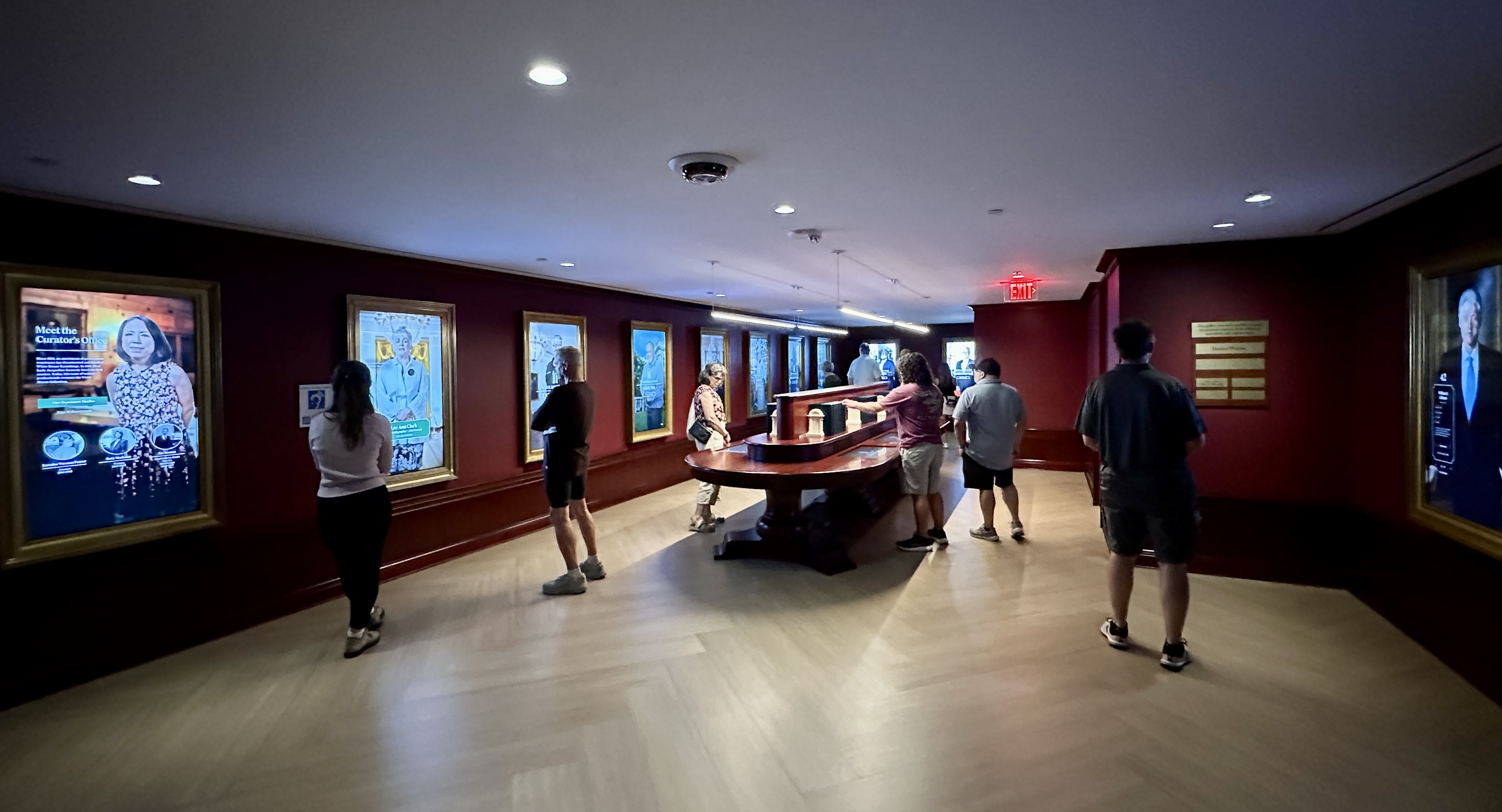
Interactive videos feature presidents, first ladies, and White House staffers

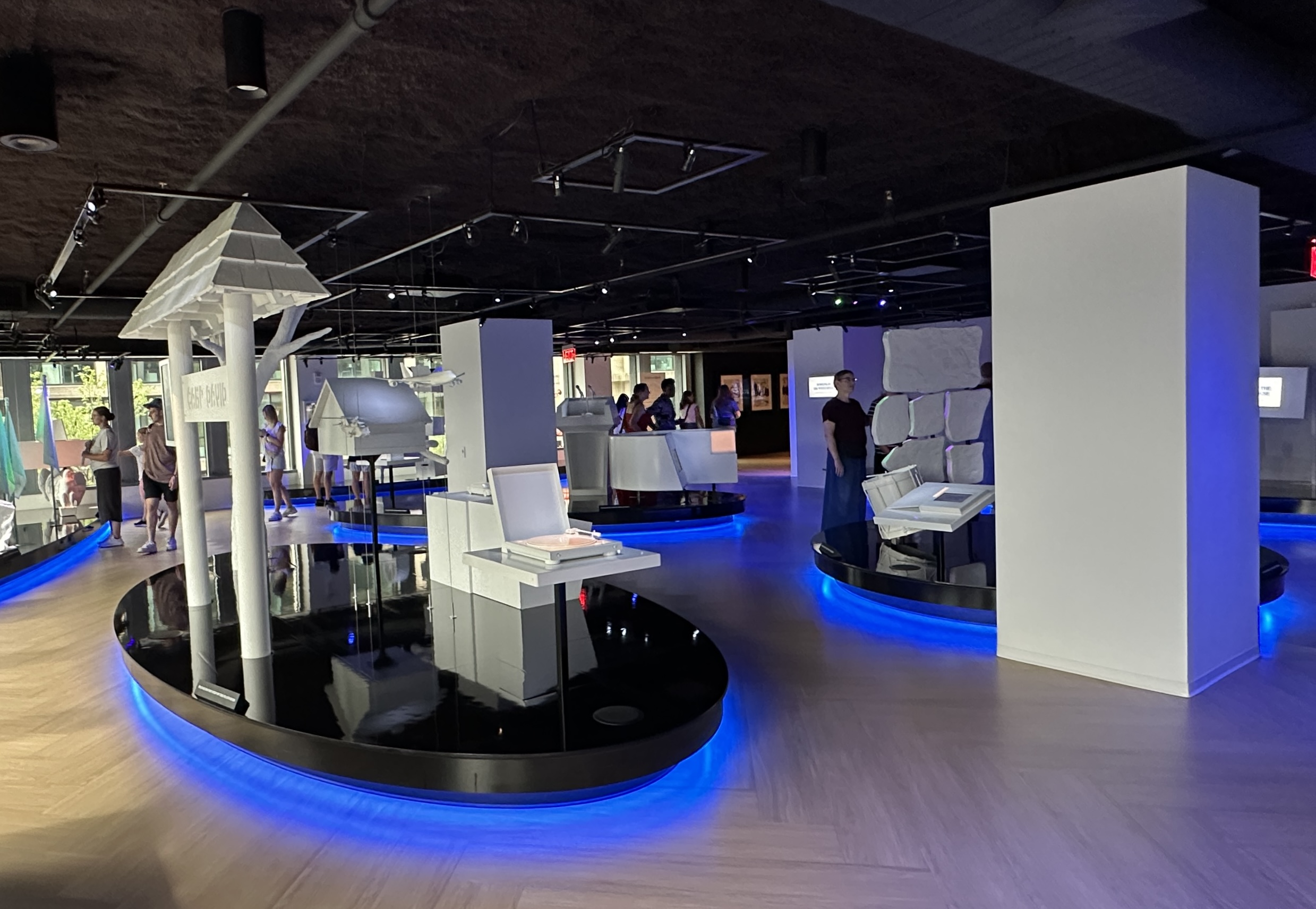
"Stories in Objects" includes 32 interactive objects related to the White House

== See also ==
- List of museums in Washington, D.C.
- White House Visitor Center
