= Floor Frame =

1963–1987 sculpture series by Isamu Noguchi

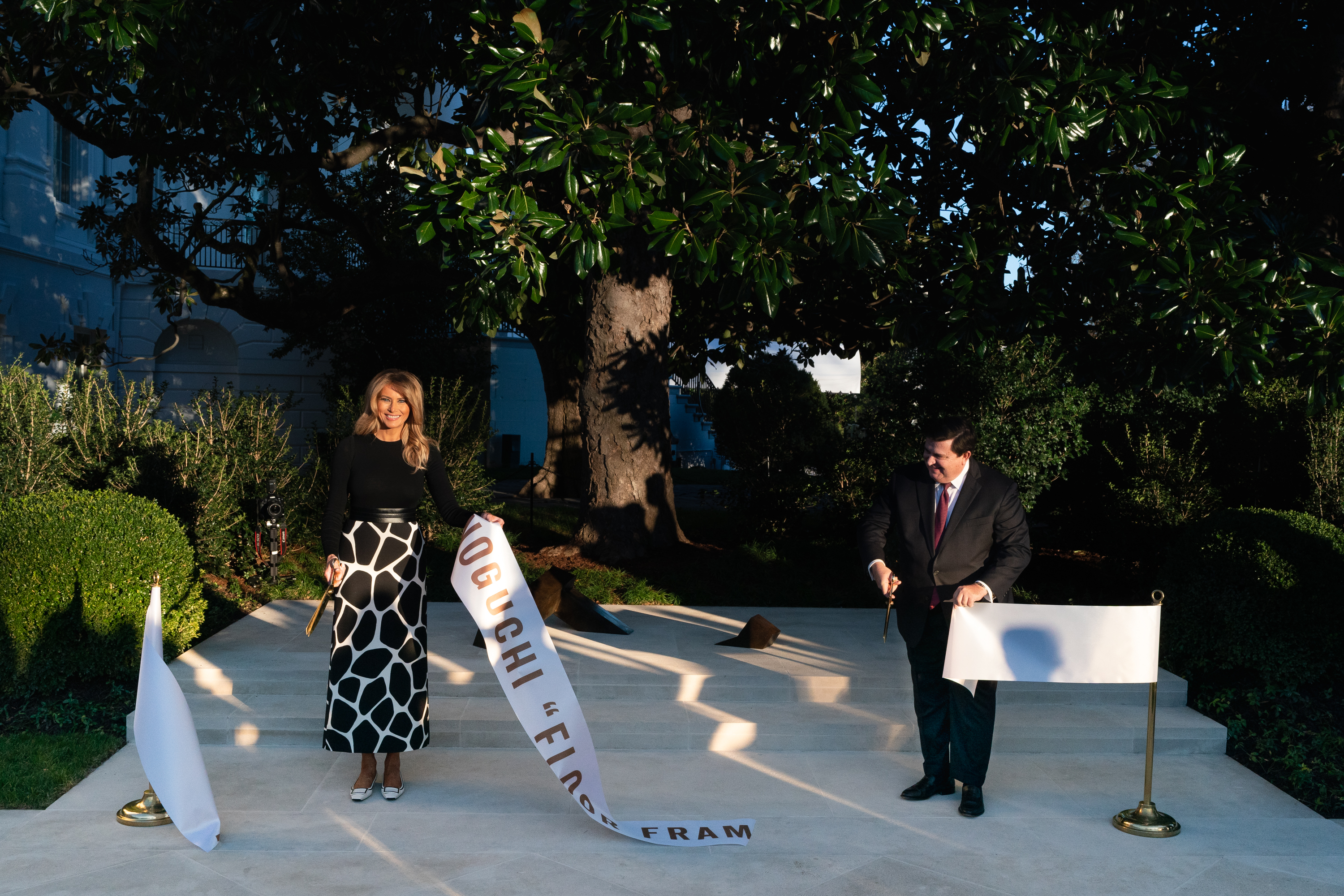
Melania Trump and Stewart McLaurin unveiling Floor Frame at the White House Rose Garden in 2020

Floor Frame is a series of abstract sculptures by Isamu Noguchi that were created in 1962 and cast between 1963 and 1987.

Noguchi said that when he created Floor Frame he had "made many other pieces in relation to floor space at that time, but this seemed to best define the essentiality of floor, not as sculpture alone but as part of the concept of floor". He also intended the piece to represent the "intersection of a tree and the ground, taking on the qualities of both an implied root system and the canopy". Displayed in two pieces, Floor Frame seems to fall into and rise from the ground. The larger piece drives into the ground and arises at an angle with a smaller piece seeming to emerge at a small distance.

A 1970 sculpture by Noguchi, called Floor Frame (Remembering India) is in the collection of the Noguchi Museum. It is made from Siena marble and black granite, arranged in stripes.

== List of versions ==
The casting model for Floor Frame was made from balsawood in 1962. It has the number 519A in Noguchi's catalogue raisonné. A 1963 casting in bronze with a black patina, number 519B-2/6 was fabricated by Fonditori Artistici, Rome. 519B-4/6, cast in 1974 in bronze with a black patina, was formerly part of the collection of Eileen and I.M. Pei and was sold from their collection at Christie's in 2019 for $399,000. It was fabricated by Fonderia D'Arte Tesconi, Pietrasanta. 519B-5/6 was cast in 1984 in bronze with a brown patina, and was fabricated by Fonderia D'Arte Tesconi, Pietrasanta. The final cast, 519B-6/6, cast in 1987 in bronze with a gold patina, was fabricated by Fonderia D'Arte Tesconi, Pietrasanta.

The 1962 casting model, 1963 bronze with a black patina cast and the 1984 and 1987 casts are in the collection of the Noguchi Museum in Long Island City, New York.

=== White House edition ===
The first of the six pieces created in the initial 1962 series is displayed at the White House in Washington, D.C. It is item 519B-1/6 in Noguchi's catalogue raisonné and was cast in bronze in 1963.

It was bought at auction at Sotheby's in March 2020 on behalf of the White House Historical Association for $125,000. It was the first art work by an Asian American artist to enter the official collection of the White House. The work was chosen for the White House collection by Lydia Tederick, the curator of the White House with the approval of the Committee for the Preservation of the White House.

It was unveiled in the White House Rose Garden in November 2020 by the First Lady of the United States Melania Trump and Stewart McLaurin, the director of the White House Historical Association. On her official Twitter account Trump wrote that Floor Frame was " ... humble in scale, complements the authority of the Oval Office, & represents the important contributions of Asian American artists". She described it as "embodying themes of resilience and renewal" in her eponymous memoir of 2024. The piece is situated under a magnolia tree on a raised white concrete floor at the east entrance to the Rose Garden. McLaurin wrote for ARTnews that the piece represented "the beautiful multiplicity of cultures that make up the United States of America" and that it was an example of how the collection of the White House has expanded to include piece by diverse artists. He also wrote that it "signifies the ongoing efforts we must make to affirmatively lift up American artists of all backgrounds and experiences" and that the work was a "vote of confidence in the diverse cultures that make up the United States".

The director of the Noguchi Museum, Brett Littman, said that the acquisition came at "a complicated moment" in reference to Donald Trump's refusal to accept his loss in the recent presidential election but said that "Administrations come and go, but artwork remains. We do feel proud, and we think Noguchi would feel proud as well". Writing in Hyperallergic, Amy Lyford "gasped at the vicious cynicism of the choice" feeling that it was an attempt to artwash the immigration policies of the Trump administration.
