= Cabinet Room =

Cabinet Room may refer to:

- Cabinet Room (10 Downing Street), the meeting place of the Cabinet of the United Kingdom.
- Cabinet Room (White House), the meeting place of the Cabinet of the United States.
- Cabinet (room), a private room in the domestic architecture and that of palaces of Early Modern Europe.
