= White House Rose Garden =

Garden in Washington, D.C., US

Coordinates: 38°53′51″N 77°02′14″W

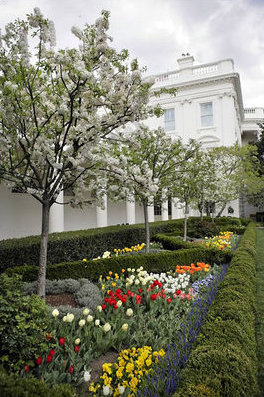
The Rose Garden prior to the 2020 renovations The West Colonnade, designed by Benjamin Henry Latrobe and Thomas Jefferson, can be seen in the background.

The White House Rose Garden is a garden area bordering the Oval Office and the West Wing of the White House in Washington, D.C., United States. The general space is approximately 125 feet (38 m) long by 60 feet (18 m) wide and 7,500 square feet (697 m^{2}). It is adjacent to the South Lawn and commonly used as a stage for presidential receptions and media events due to its proximity to the Oval Office and West Colonnade.

== Design and horticulture ==
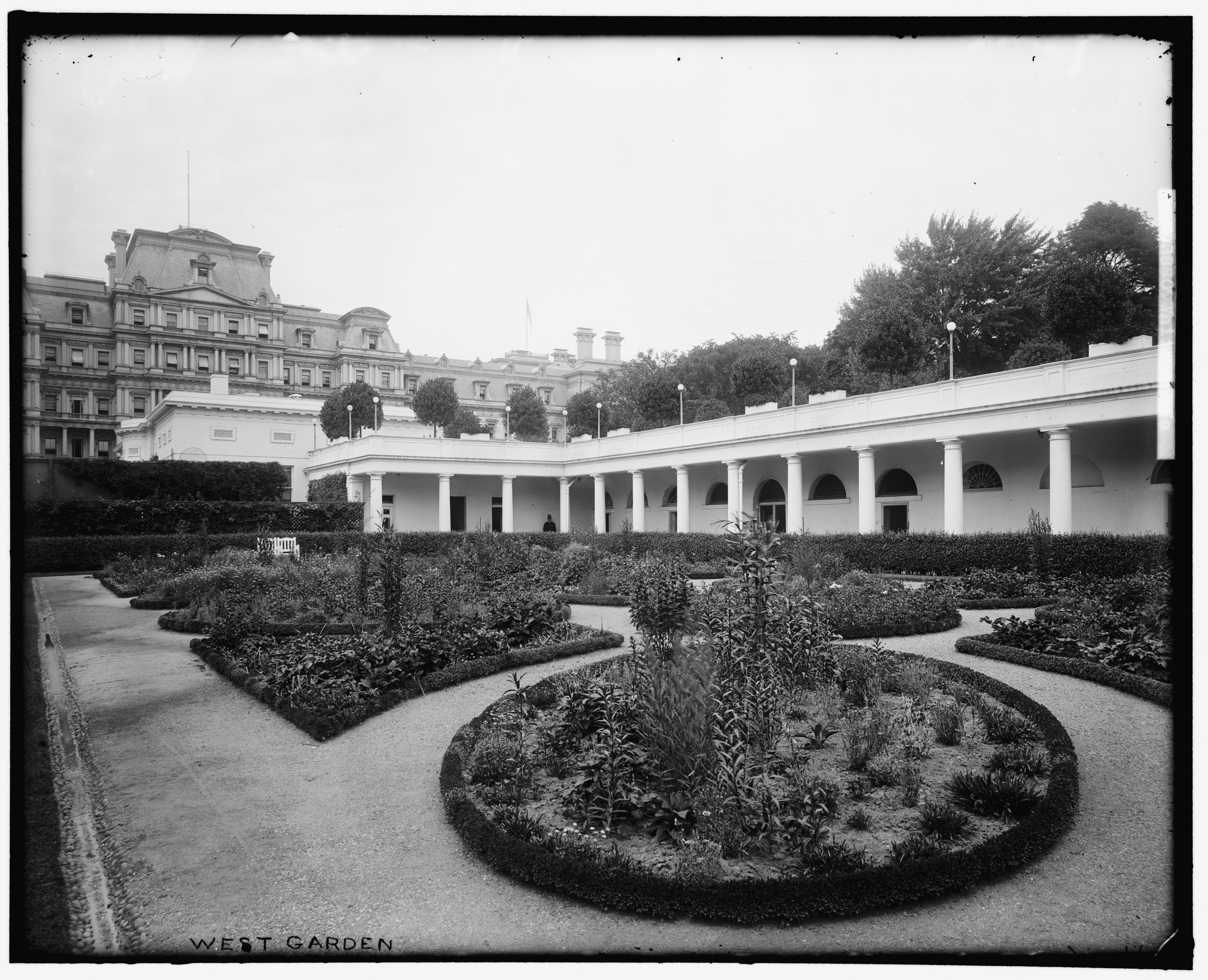
The west colonial garden in the Theodore Roosevelt era, around 1908

=== History ===
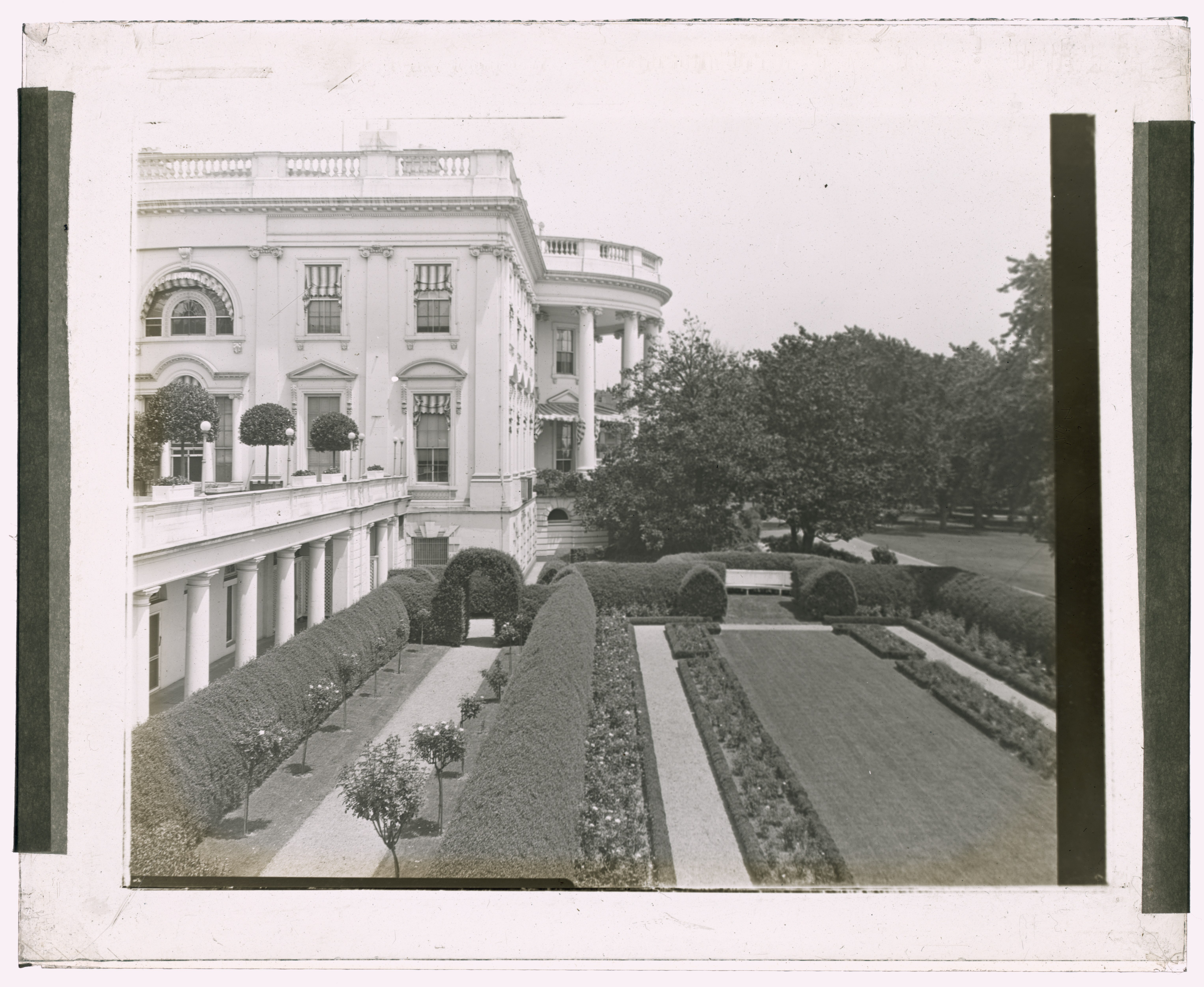
1921 image of the Southwest rose garden that replaced the former west colonial garden

Prior to 1902, the grounds of the modern Oval Office, Cabinet Room, and Rose Garden contained extensive stables for horses and coaches. There was also a conservatory rose house in the area. During the 1902 Roosevelt renovation of the White House, First Lady Edith Roosevelt established a "proper colonial garden" in place of the conservatory.

The White House Rose Garden was established in 1913 by Ellen Louise Axson Wilson, wife of Woodrow Wilson, and designed by landscape architect George Burnap. In 1935, President Franklin D. Roosevelt commissioned Frederick Law Olmsted Jr. to redesign the garden, and he installed cast iron furniture pieces.

=== 1961 renovations ===
In 1961, during the John F. Kennedy administration, the garden was largely redesigned by Rachel Lambert Mellon concurrently with extensive repair work to the East Garden. Mellon created a space with a more defined central lawn, bordered by flower beds that were planted in a French formal garden style while largely using American botanical specimens. Although individual plantings are changed frequently according to the wishes of the incumbent administration, until 2020 the garden followed the same layout first established by Mellon, where each flower bed was planted with a series of pale pink 'Katherine' crabapples and Littleleaf lindens bordered by low diamond-shaped hedges of thyme. (The 'Katherine' crabapples were replaced in 2019 with a white-flowering variety called Spring Snow, which did not do well.) Additionally, the outer edges to the flower bed which faced the central lawn were edged with boxwood, and each of the four corners to the garden were punctuated by Magnolia × soulangeana; specifically, obtaining specimens that were found growing along the banks of the Tidal Basin by Mellon. Mellon tasked White House Head Gardener Irvin Williams with planting the trees. Initially blocked from doing so by the National Park Service, Williams secretly removed and transported the trees from the Basin to the White House under cover of night.

Ever since then, roses have served as the primary flowering plants in the garden, including large numbers of 'Queen Elizabeth' grandiflora roses, along with the hybrid tea roses 'Pascali', 'Pat Nixon', and 'King's Ransom'. A shrub rose, 'Nevada', also served to add a cool note of white coloration to the landscaping. Seasonal flowers are further interspersed to add nearly year-round color and variety to the garden. Some of the Spring blooming bulbs planted in the Rose Garden include jonquil, daffodil, fritillaria, grape hyacinth, tulips, chionodoxa and squill. Summer blooming annuals are changed on a near yearly basis. In the fall, chrysanthemum and flowering kale bring color leading all the way up until the early winter days.

=== 2020 renovations ===
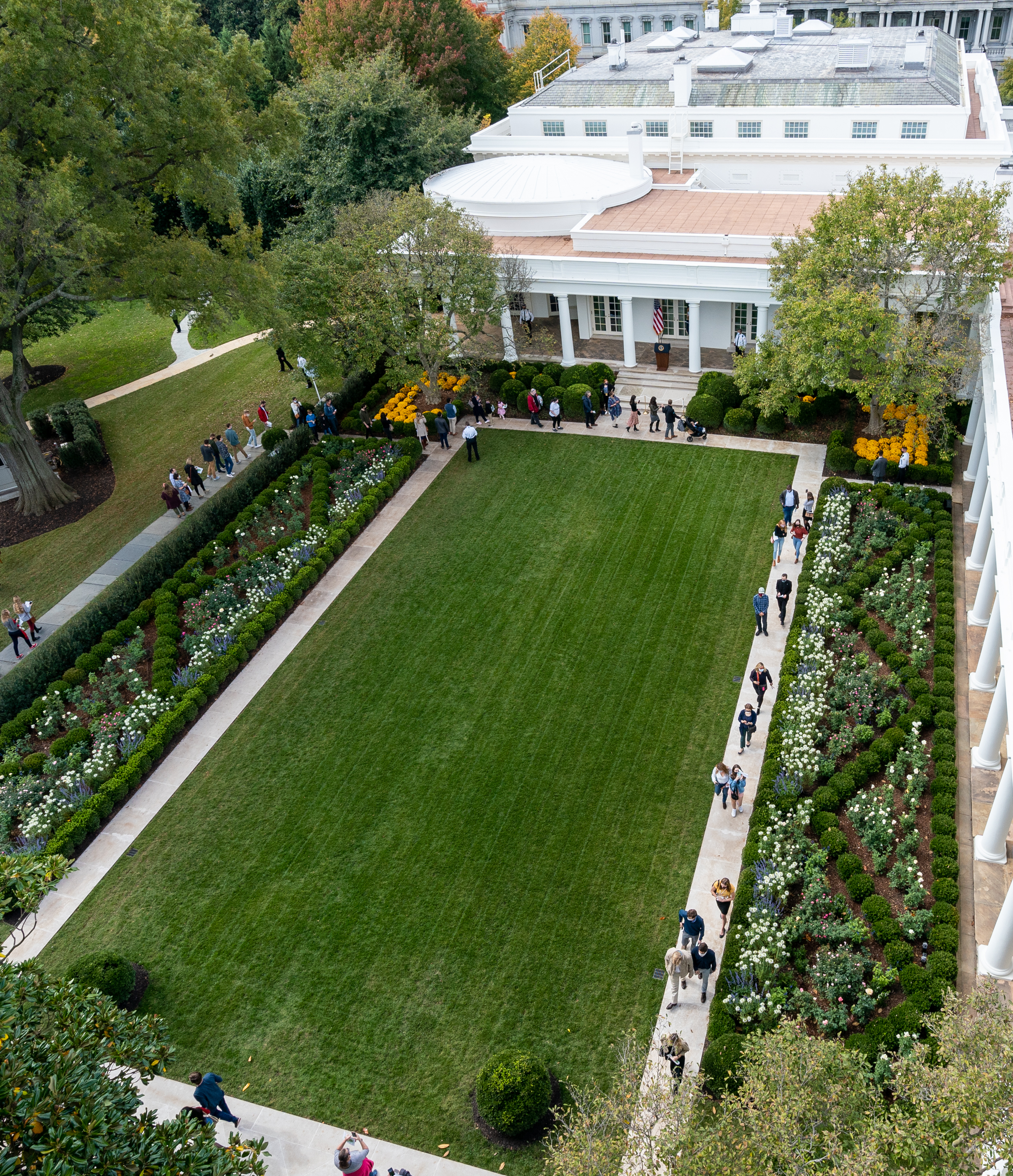
The garden after 2020 renovations

First Lady Melania Trump commissioned an August 2020 renovation of the garden by Oehme, van Sweden and Perry Guillot. In the flower beds, white and pale pink rose bushes are intermixed with seasonal bulbs and annuals, including the Pope John Paul II Rose in honor of the first time a pope visited the White House in 1979. A new three-foot (0.9 m) wide limestone walkway was laid around the borders of the garden providing greater access complying with the Americans with Disabilities Act. The crabapple trees, added during the Kennedy redesign, were relocated elsewhere on the White House grounds as the trees were failing to thrive. The renovation further addressed technological issues such as lighting, drainage, electrical and audiovisual requirements capable for hosting televised and streamed events. One of Trump’s stated goals submitted in her plans was to "fulfill the dynamic needs of the modern presidency."

Presidential historian Michael Beschloss opined that the renovation was an "evisceration" of the Rose Garden, and that "decades of American history [was] made to disappear." Vogue reported that many Twitter users described the renovation as "sterile, bland, and devoid of any joy". The Washington Post, however, stated that the renovation was "long overdue" and noted several problems with the Rose Garden's pre-renovation landscaping, including a poorly-drained lawn which required annual replacement, overgrown roots, the die-off of multiple rose bushes "to the point where only a dozen or so remained", and the parterres' susceptibility to boxwood blight.

White House interior designer and Grounds Committee member Thammanoune Kannalikham described the decision as a "collective" one, made “by the entire team to respond to the changed environment of the garden ... It allows the roses to thrive (having increased in quantity from 19 to over 200), while bringing in the greater narrative of the colonnade into the design of the garden."

The abstract sculpture Floor Frame by Isamu Noguchi is displayed under a magnolia tree in the Rose Garden. It was unveiled by Melania Trump and Stewart McLaurin, the director of the White House Historical Association in November 2020. It was the first art work by an Asian American artist to enter the official collection of the White House.

=== 2025 renovations ===
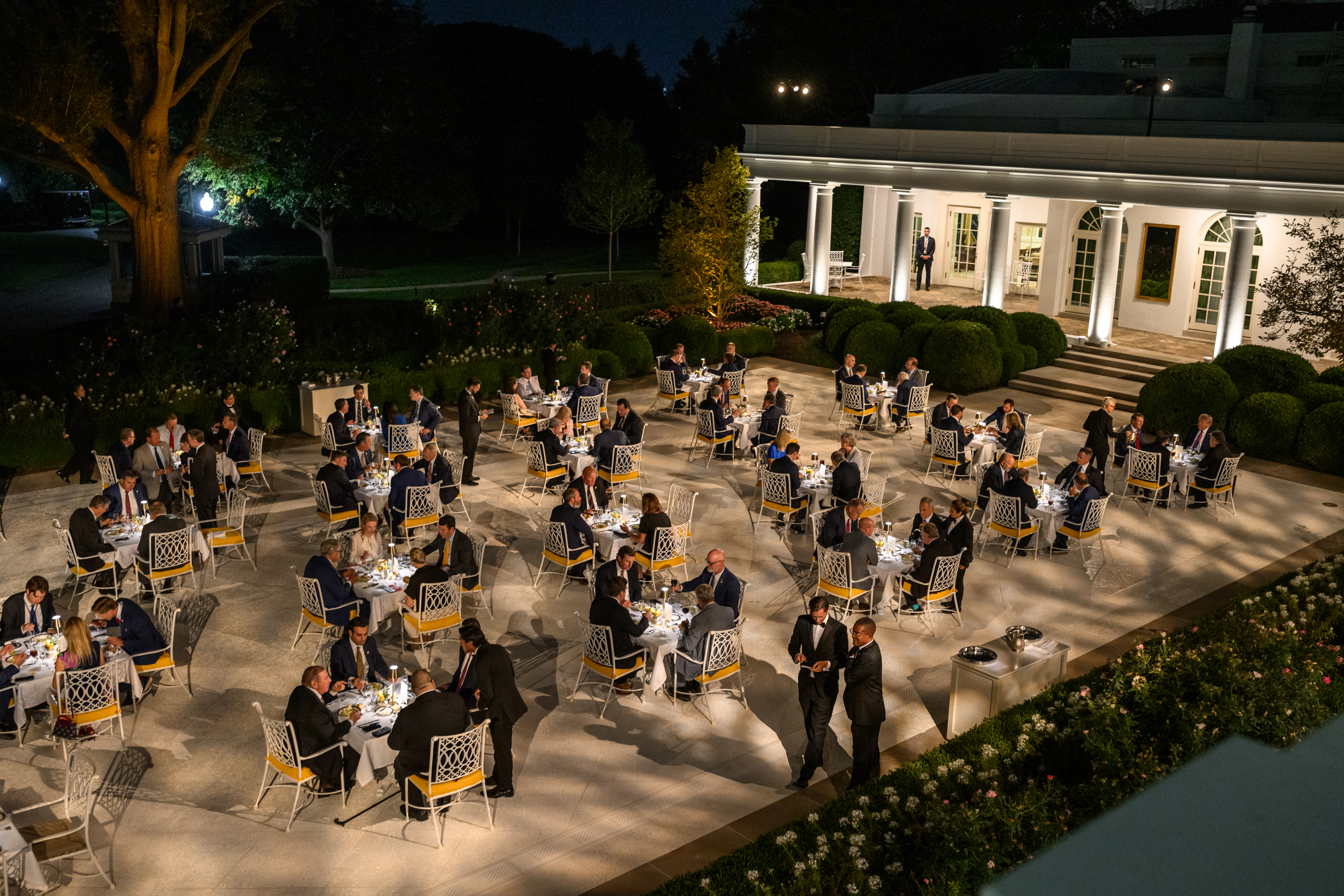
Trump hosts a dinner on Rose Garden Club patio September 5, 2025

In July 2025, President Donald Trump had the lawn paved over with stone tiles laid in a diamond pattern over an improved drainage system, while leaving the surrounding garden beds intact. The stone was sourced from Indiana limestone quarries. On September 5, at an event for Republican members of Congress, Trump said: "We call it the Rose Garden Club. And it’s a club for senators, for congresspeople and for people in Washington, and frankly, people that can bring peace and success to our country."

A bronze statue of George Washington made from a cast of a marble sculpture by Jean-Antoine Houdon, formerly on public display at the Washington Monument, was moved to the Rose Garden in October 2025. By mid-2026, other statues were added, including of Alexander Hamilton and Benjamin Franklin. A statue of a seated Thomas Jefferson signing the Declaration of Independence was added as a gift of the sculptor, George Lundeen. in April 2026, the statue "Freedom's Charge" by sculptor Chas Fagan was added.

== Official and informal use ==
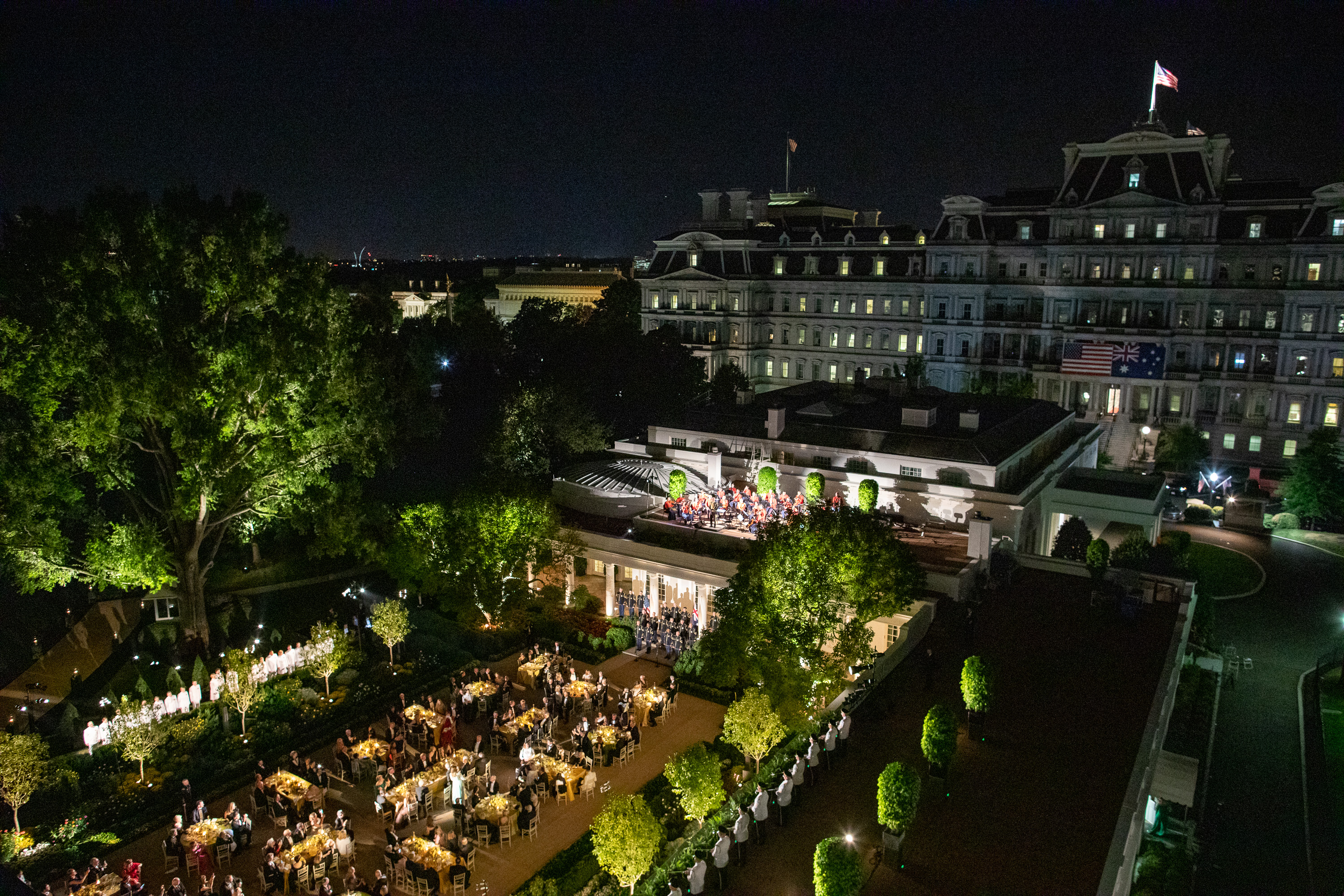
The Rose Garden arranged for a state dinner at night in 2019

Beginning with the establishment of the garden in the early twentieth century, the Rose Garden has been used for events. President Wilson met there with the press for informal questions. President Herbert Hoover began a tradition of welcoming and being photographed with prominent citizens there. Calvin Coolidge used the garden for making public announcements about policy and staffing decisions. President John F. Kennedy welcomed Project Mercury astronauts in the garden. Many presidential news conferences take place in the garden, as well as occasional White House dinners and ceremonies. Joint news conferences with the president and a visiting head of state have been held in the Rose Garden. The wedding of President Richard Nixon's daughter Tricia to Edward F. Cox took place in the Rose Garden in 1971. On July 25, 1994, a declaration of peace between Israel and Jordan was signed in the Rose Garden. Presidents frequently host American Olympic and major league athletes in the Rose Garden after winning in their respective sport. George W. Bush welcomed the Stanley Cup champion Carolina Hurricanes to the Rose Garden after their victory in 2006. In August 2020, First Lady Melania Trump gave a speech for the second night of the 2020 Republican National Convention in the Rose Garden before an audience of 70 people.

On September 26, 2020, Donald Trump announced his Supreme Court nomination of Amy Coney Barrett in a ceremony in the Rose Garden before an audience of top Washington officials, other dignitaries, and family members. Following the event, several attendees tested positive for COVID-19, including Trump himself.

Donald and Melania Trump accompany Xi Jinping and Peng Liyuan viewing the Rose Garden Military Review.

On September 23 to 25, 2026, Donald and Melania Trump hosted a state visit for the Chinese leader Xi Jinping and his wife Peng Liyuan. On September 24, Xi Jinping and Peng Liyuan were received to the White House in front of the Diplomatic Reception Room. After the reception speeches, the two leaders and their wives, respective delegations and special guests proceeded to the Rose Garden for the celebratory Military Review. As the United States Air Force Honor Guard were positioned on the West Wing Colonnade roof displaying the American and Chinese flags, the 15‑minute ceremony included the Old Guard Fife and Drum Corps dressed in Continental Army dress uniforms, the US Marine Corps Silent Drill Platoon and the United States Marine Drum and Bugle Corps performances with a flyover finale featuring a B-2 Spirit and four F-22 Raptors.

=== Rose Garden strategy ===
The phrase "Rose Garden strategy" refers to staying inside or on the grounds of the White House, as opposed to traveling throughout the country. For example, Jimmy Carter's initial efforts to end the Iran hostage crisis (1979–1981) were a Rose Garden strategy because he mostly held discussions with his close advisers in the White House rather than traveling to elicit public support. Four years earlier, Carter had accused Gerald Ford of the same strategy and said that President Ford was using White House actions to garner free publicity while as challenger, Carter had to struggle for press coverage.
