= National Geographic Traveler =

Travel magazine

- December 2012/January 2013 cover of National Geographic Traveler
- Editor: George Stone
- Frequency: 4 per year-1984-1988 6 per year-1989-1998 8 per year-1998-2016 6 per year-2016-2019
- Total circulation: 735,453 (June, 2012)
- First issue: Spring, 1984
- Final issue: December, 2019
- Company: NG Media (Disney Publishing Worldwide)
- Country: United States
- Based in: Washington, D.C.
- Language: English
- ISSN: 0747-0932

National Geographic Traveler is a magazine published by NG Media in Armenia, Belgium, the Netherlands, China, Croatia, the Czech Republic, Germany, Greece, Indonesia, Latin America, Poland, Romania, Slovenia, Spain, and the UK. The US edition was published from 1984 to 2019.

== History ==
National Geographic Traveler was launched as a quarterly publication in the Spring of 1984 by the National Geographic Society under the leadership of president Gilbert M Grosvenor. Vice president for publications Robert L. Breeden oversaw the launch. Joan Tapper was the first editor. The final US print edition appeared in December 2019, with George Stone as editor. In its 35-year run, the US print edition had six editors:

- Joan Tapper, 1984–1989
- Richard Busch, 1988–1998
- Keith Bellows, 1998–2015
- Norie Quintos, Acting Editor, 2015
- Maggie Zackowitz, 2015–2016
- George Stone, 2016–2019

In September 2013, the National Geographic Society formed National Geographic Travel group by consolidating its travel assets, including National Geographic Traveler magazine, National Geographic Expeditions, its travel books, digital travel content, maps, apps and travel community. National Geographic Traveler editor Keith Bellows was named senior vice president of the newly-formed group.

On September 9, 2015, the National Geographic Society announced that it would reorganize its media properties and publications (including National Geographic Traveler) into a new company known as National Geographic Partners LLC. 21st Century Fox paid $725 million to own 73% of this new, for-profit, corporation.

The acquisition of 21st Century Fox by The Walt Disney Company began December 14, 2017 and continued to March 20, 2019. Among other key assets, the acquisition of 21st Century Fox by Disney included a 73% stake in National Geographic Partners (including National Geographic Traveler). As of August 2019 NG Media publishing operations were assumed by Disney Publishing Worldwide. Disney ceased the National Geographic Traveler print edition with the December 2019 issue.
