= Robert L. Breeden =

American editor, publisher

- Born: Robert Lewis Breeden; June 20, 1925; Montgomery, West Virginia, U.S.
- Died: March 15, 2013 (aged 87); McLean, Virginia, U.S.
- Education: West Virginia University Institute of Technology, Class of 1949
- Occupations: former chairman, White House Historical Association
- Spouse: Elizabeth Hilda Rushing Breeden
- Children: Cynthia Scudder, daughter
- Parent(s): Lala and Fredrick Lewis Breeden

Robert Lewis Breeden (June 20, 1925 – March 15, 2013) was an editor, publisher, senior executive at the National Geographic Society, and chairman of both the White House Historical Association and U.S. Capitol Historical Society.

== Early life ==
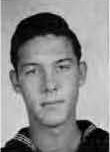
Breeden served in World War II in the U.S. Navy 70th Construction Battalion.

Robert Lewis Breeden was born in Montgomery, West Virginia, on June 20, 1925. During World War II, he served in the Pacific in the 70th Naval Construction Battalion (Seabees), which fought at Guam, Saipan, and Iwo Jima. After the war, Breeden entered the West Virginia University Institute of Technology and graduated in 1949. He received a master's degree in journalism in 1952 from the University of Missouri, where he taught for three years. At a graduation ceremony he spoke with and was recruited by Gilbert H. Grosvenor, editor of the National Geographic magazine.

== National Geographic ==
Breeden joined the National Geographic staff in 1955, and worked there for 36 years. In 1975, Breeden launched National Geographic World magazine, which soon became the largest circulation children's magazine in the U.S. and is now known as National Geographic Kids. He also oversaw the launch of National Geographic Traveler in 1984, and built the society's Educational Media division. Eventually becoming senior vice president, he managed six divisions and oversaw the publication and sale of more than 100 million books.

== Historical societies ==
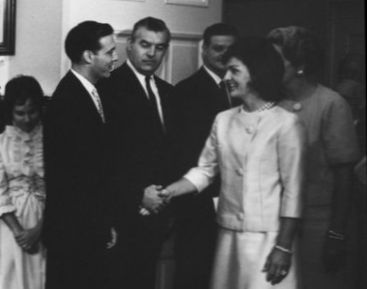
First Lady Jacqueline Kennedy thanks Robert Breeden for his work on the White House Guidebook.

Breeden was an assistant illustrations editor at National Geographic when he was tapped in 1961 by its president, Melville Bell Grosvenor, to produce the first official guidebook of the White House for the newly created White House Historical Society. While at the National Geographic, he continued to work on later editions of the guidebook for the society as well as books on the presidents and their wives.

In 1975, First Lady Betty Ford announced that the sale of the books supervised by Breeden had netted $975,000 towards the purchase of historical items for the White House.

Breeden continued to oversee publications for the White House Historical Society and in 1996 became its CEO. In 1997, Breeden announced the launching of White House History, a new journal published by the White House Historical Association which continues publication to this day.

Breeden advised the U.S. Capitol Historical Society on its publications program from 1962 until his death in 2013. From 1991 to 1993 he was vice president of the organization, and from 1993 to 2000 he served as its chairman of the board.

In 2007, Breeden assisted in the acquisition and relaunching of the history magazine American Heritage, serving as its chairman for six years until his death in 2013.

== Awards ==
The board of directors of the Capitol Historical Society voted to present the first chairman's Fred Schwengel Award (named after the society's founder) to Breeden in 2012 in recognition of his many years of service to the society.
