= White House Endowment Trust =

The White House Endowment Trust, sometimes also called the White House Endowment Fund, is a private, non-profit, tax-exempt fund established to finance the ongoing restoration and refurbishment of the state rooms at the White House, the official home and principal workplace of the president of the United States. The fund is funded by private donation, through individual citizens and corporations. The trust is administered by the White House Historical Association.

Founded in 1964 as the White House Preservation Fund, concurrent with the creation of the Committee for the Preservation of the White House, the goal was to establish an endowment to finance ongoing restoration projects. First Lady Rosalynn Carter restyled the fund as the White House Endowment Trust in 1978 and substantially increased the fund's profile and worth.

By the late 1980s performance of the fund had dwindled. First Lady Barbara Bush sought to revitalize the fund as the White House Endowment Trust to be managed by the White House Historical Association. She set a goal of raising a $25 million endowment. First Lady Hillary Clinton's continued support help expand the trust's endowment to over $35 million. As first lady, Clinton also made extensive use of the fund in refurbishing the Blue Room, Red Room, State Dining Room, Cross Hall, and East Room.

In April, 2014 the White House Endowment Trust reported net assets of $51,849,751 on IRS Form 990.

== See also ==
- White House Acquisition Trust
- White House Historical Association
- Committee for the Preservation of the White House
