= White House Acquisition Trust =

Art fund

The White House Acquisition Trust is a private, non-profit, tax-exempt fund established to finance the purchase of fine art and decorative arts for the White House, the official home and principal workplace of the president of the United States. The fund is funded by private donation, through individual citizens and corporations. The trust is administered by the White House Historical Association.

In May 2006 the White House Acquisition Trust reported net assets of $8,485,245 on IRS Form 990.

== See also ==
- Art in the White House
- White House Endowment Trust
- White House Historical Association
- Committee for the Preservation of the White House
