= Stewart McLaurin =

American author

- Born: Stewart Douglas McLaurin; 1959; Birmingham, Alabama
- Education: BA, University of Alabama
- Awards: 2026 University of Alabama Distinguished Alumni Award

Stewart McLaurin is an author and non-profit executive who has been the president of the White House Historical Association since 2014.

== Biography ==
Stewart Douglas McLaurin is the son of Stewart Parnell McLaurin and Gwendolyn McLaurin (née Stafford). An Alabama native, McLaurin attended Shades Valley High School and the University of Alabama.

Active in philanthropic management, from 1989 to present, McLaurin has held leadership positions with national nonprofit and higher education organizations, including the Mount Vernon estate, the Ronald Reagan Presidential Foundation, the Motion Picture Association, Georgetown University, the American Village Citizenship Trust, Catawba College Board of Trustees, the National Trust for Scotland USA Foundation, the Concordia Advisory Council, Purdue University's Krach Institute for Tech Diplomacy Advisory Council, the Charleston Symposium Advisory Board, and the American Red Cross.

After leaving the American Red Cross, McLaurin went to work for the 2000 presidential campaign of Elizabeth Dole.

== White House Historical Association (WHHA) ==
Since 2014, McLaurin has served as president of the White House Historical Association. During this time, the Association's educational activities have grown to include producing educational video series and hosting virtual and in person events. A new interactive museum, The People's House: A White House Experience, was opened in September 2024.

McLaurin is the host of The White House 1600 Sessions, the WHHA's official audio and video podcast.

== Publications ==
McLaurin has written a monthly opinion column for USA Today since 2022, covering the history of the White House, Presidents and First Ladies. McLaurin has also written and published three books about White House history.

=== Books ===
- McLaurin, Stewart (2023). The White House: Designed by James Hoban, Built by Many Hands!. The White House Historical Association. ISBN 9781950273324.
- McLaurin, Stewart (2021). James Hoban: Designer and Builder of the White House. The White House Historical Association. ISBN 9781931917964.
- McLaurin, Stewart (2016). Pontifell, Luke Ives (ed.). White House Miscellany. Thornwillow Press.
