= White House Historical Association =

US educational organization

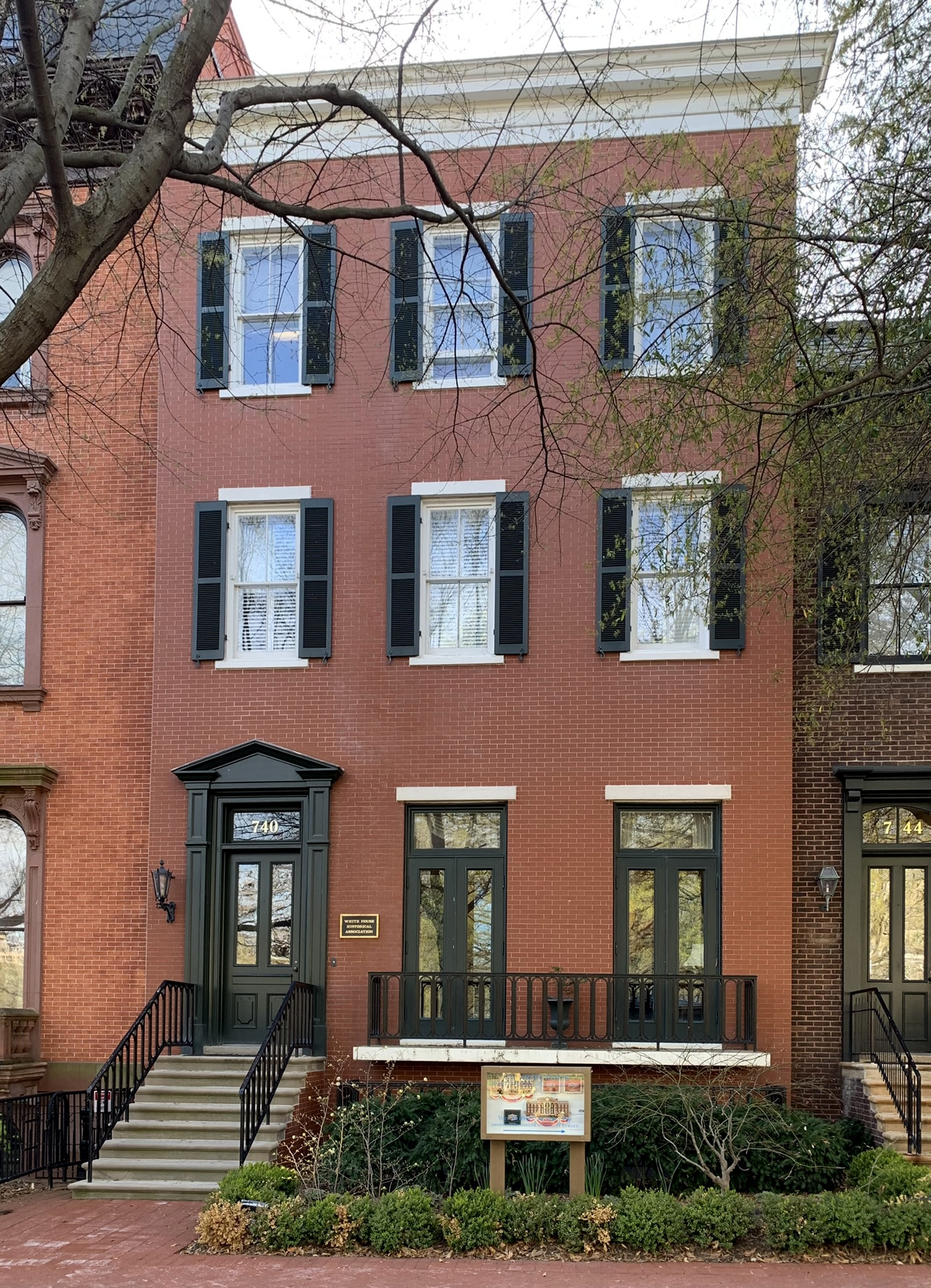
- White House Historical Association building on Jackson Place in Washington, D.C.
- Abbreviation: WHHA
- Formation: November 3, 1961; 64 years ago
- Founder: Jacqueline Kennedy
- Type: Private non-profit
- Purpose: Historical education and preservation
- President: Stewart McLaurin
- Website: whitehousehistory.org

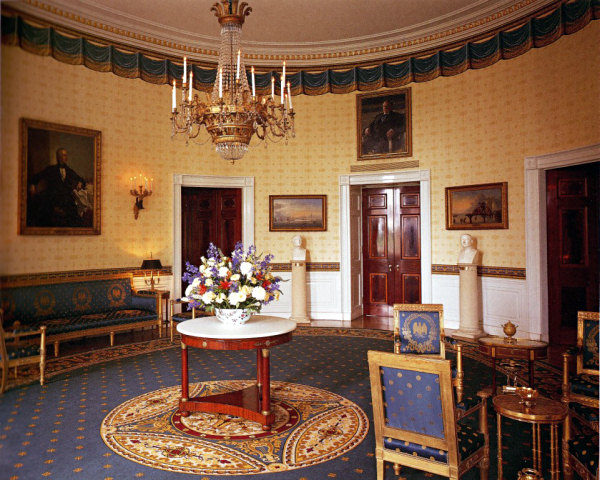
The White House's Blue Room refurbished in 1995 with contributions from the White House Historical Association's White House Endowment Trust

The White House Historical Association, founded in 1961 through efforts of First Lady Jacqueline Kennedy, is a private, nonprofit organization that works to preserve the history of the White House and make its history more accessible to the public. The association operates The People's House: A White House Experience, an interactive museum on Pennsylvania Avenue focused on the history of the White House. As of March 2022, the president of the association is Stewart McLaurin.

== History ==
After moving into the White House in 1961, First Lady Jacqueline Kennedy founded the White House Historical Association, which was chartered on November 3 of that year. The goals of the association were to raise private funds for maintaining and renovating the White House and to create an official White House guidebook.

In 1981, under First Lady Nancy Reagan, the association began its current practice of selling a unique White House Christmas ornament to the public each year. Beginning in 1982, each year's ornament honors a different president. Since 1981, the ornaments are primarily manufactured at Beacon Design by ChemArt in Lincoln, Rhode Island. As of 2019, hundreds of thousands of ornaments are sold each year. The White House Historical Association also produces the wooden eggs distributed during the annual White House Easter Egg Roll.

Financier and former White House staffer David M. Rubenstein donated $10 million to the association in 2011 to establish the David M. Rubenstein National Center for White House History, an educational institute under the White House Historical Association's purview. In 2016, the association created a Digital Library, currently hosted on Amazon Web Services (AWS). The partnership between the association and AWS expanded the following year. In 2018, the association shared a collection of roughly 25,000 photographs of White House history that it had organized and digitized for the first time. The association also created a monthly podcast, called 1600 Sessions, in 2017.

== Scope ==
=== Maintenance and restoration ===
In its work, the White House Historical Association collaborates with the first family, the White House chief usher, and the curator of the White House. The association focuses on maintaining and interpreting the state rooms of the White House Executive Residence and the rest of the White House Complex. The association also works with the Committee for the Preservation of the White House to curate and purchase new decorations and art for the White House. This includes funding the creation of unique state china tableware for several presidential administrations and funding one portrait of each President and First Lady. The association also helps fund maintenance and restoration of some rooms of the White House.

=== Education ===
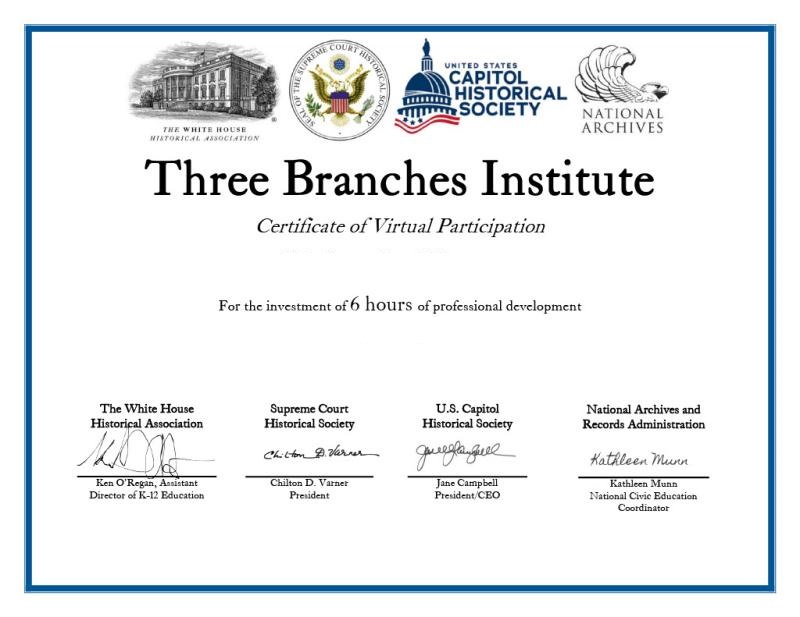
Three Branches Institute certificate

The association publishes the official White House guide. In the White House Visitor Center, the association operates a gift shop and book store. The association also creates and publishes media on the history, art, and architecture of the White House, and the quarterly journal White House History. As of 1995, books published by the association had sold more than eight million copies. The association sponsors scholarship, seminars, and exhibitions on the history of the White House. As of 2009, the association awarded three White House History Fellowships each year in collaboration with the Organization of American Historians. It operates the David M. Rubenstein National Center for White House History at Decatur House.

The association offers webinars to public school teachers in order to support them with professional development, and with online resources for classroom use. This began in earnest as part of their "Digital Resources for Distance Learning" initiative which launched in April 2020, in response to the COVID-19 pandemic.

In 2024, the association opened The People's House: A White House Experience, an interactive 33,000 square feet (3,100 m^{2}) museum which gives visitors a behind-the-scenes look at the building's history. It includes replicas of the White House south facade and Oval Office.

== Funding ==
The majority of the funding for the White House Historical Association comes from private contributions, in addition to corporate contributions and the sale of publications and gift items. The association manages the White House Acquisition Trust and the White House Endowment Trust.

== Leadership ==
The association’s current president, Stewart McLaurin, has served since 2014, focused on expanding its audiences, educational programming, development base and impact. He is the author of James Hoban: Designer and Builder of the White House.

Previous top executives have been Nash Castro, Daniel E. Davis, Hillory A. Tolson, Bernard R. Meyer and Neil W. Horstman. The current board chair, John F. W. Rogers, has served since January 2022. Previous board chairs were Fred Ryan, David E. Finley Jr., Dr. Melvin Payne, Robert L. Breeden, Hugh Sidey, and Henry A. Dudley Jr.

== Bibliography ==
- Boorady, Luke (2021). Sixty Years, Twelve Visionaries. White House History Quarterly.
- Garrett, Wendell D. (1995). Our Changing White House. Boston: Northeastern University Press. ISBN 9781555532222.
- Patterson, Bradley H. (2009). To Serve the President: Continuity and Innovation in the White House Staff. Brookings Institution Press. ISBN 9780815701798.
- Seale, William (2001). The White House: The History of an American Idea. White House Historical Association. ISBN 0-912308-85-0.
- The White House: An Historic Guide. White House Historical Association. 2001. ISBN 0-912308-79-6.
