= Committee for the Preservation of the White House =

Advisory committee charged with the preservation of the White House

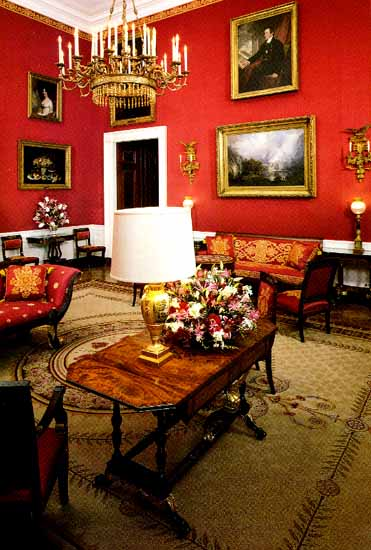
The White House Red Room before refurbishment during the administration of Bill Clinton.

The Committee for the Preservation of the White House is an advisory committee charged with the preservation of the White House, the official home and principal workplace of the president of the United States. The committee is largely made up of citizens appointed by the president for their experience with historic preservation, architecture, decorative arts, and for their scholarship in these areas. Committee members and budget information can be found in the Federal Advisory Committee Act Database.

The Committee for the Preservation of the White House was created by executive order in 1964 by President Lyndon Johnson to replace a temporary White House Furnishings Committee established by First Lady Jacqueline Kennedy during the Kennedy White House restoration (1961–1963). The committee is charged with establishing policies relating to the museum function of the White House, its state rooms and collections. It also works with the White House Historical Association in making recommendations on acquisitions for the permanent collection of the White House and provides advice on changes to principal rooms on the ground floor, state floor, and the historic guest suites on the residence floor of the White House Executive Residence.

The executive order states that the curator of the White House, chief usher of the White House, secretary of the Smithsonian Institution, chair of the United States Commission of Fine Arts, and director of the National Gallery of Art serve as ex officio members of the committee. The director of the National Park Service serves as chair of the committee, and the First Lady serves as the honorary chair of the committee.

In February 2010, Los Angeles interior designer Michael S. Smith was appointed to the committee; in August of that year, his makeover of the Oval Office was revealed to the public.

== See also ==
- Category:Individual rooms in the White House
- White House Office of the Curator
- Art in the White House
