= State banquet =

Formal meal hosted by a head of state

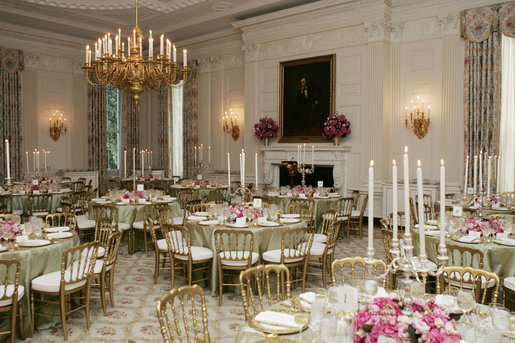
Round tables laid for a state dinner in the State Dining Room at the White House. The large gold charger plates are from the Eisenhower china service.

A state banquet is an official banquet hosted by the head of state in their official residence for another head of state, or sometimes head of government, and other guests. Usually as part of a state visit or diplomatic conference, it is held to celebrate diplomatic ties between the host and guest countries. Depending on time of the day, it may be referred to as a state dinner or state lunch. The size varies, but the numbers of diners may run into the hundreds.

In the Western world, state banquet protocol traditionally prescribe formal wear (white tie or morning dress) events that comprise military honor guards, a four- or five-course meal, musical entertainment, and ballroom dancing. There are normally short speeches and toasts made by the host and principal guest.

== History ==
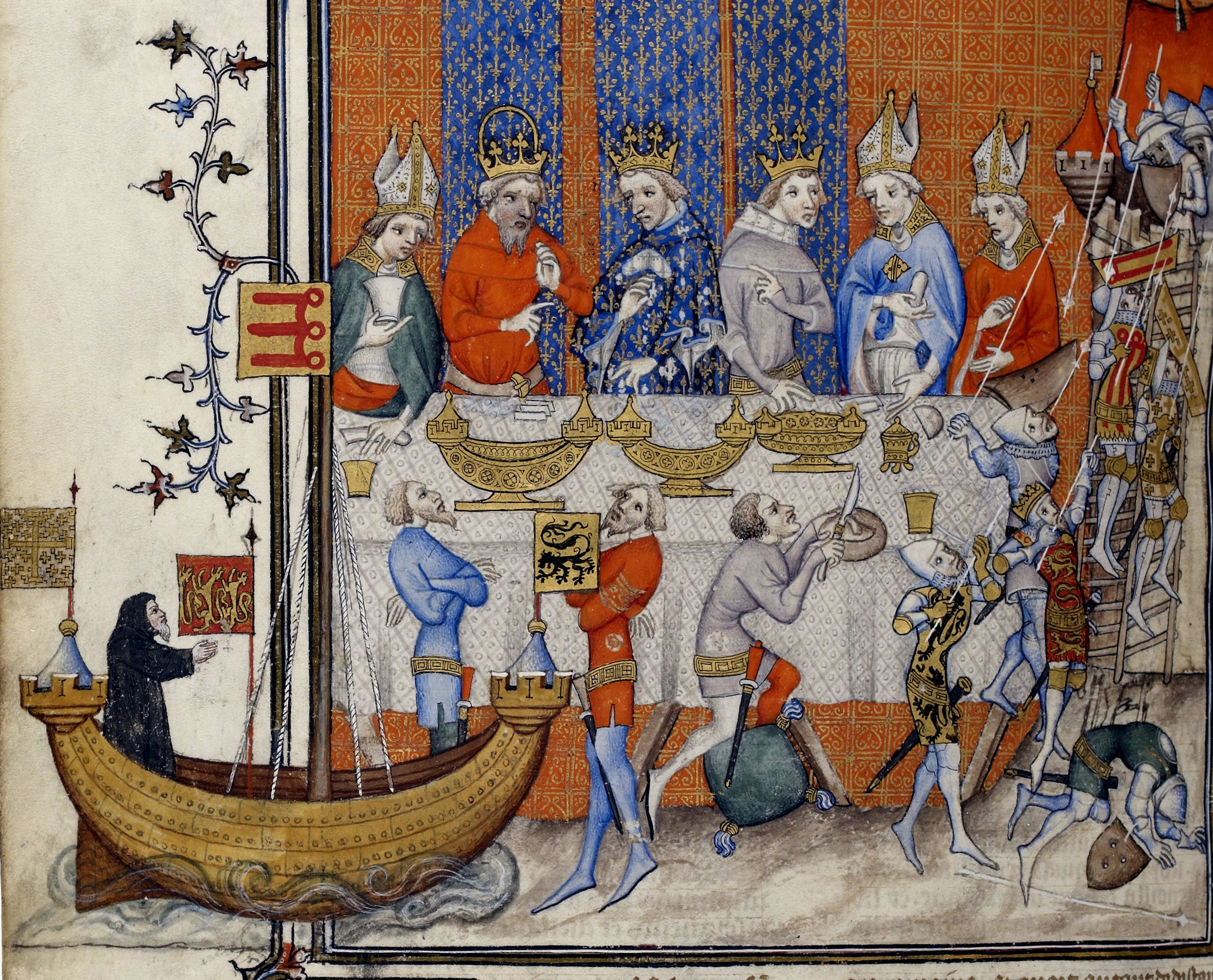
Charles V of France hosts Charles IV, Holy Roman Emperor and his son Wenceslaus IV of Bohemia in 1378. They are watching a floor-show re-enacting the taking of Jerusalem.

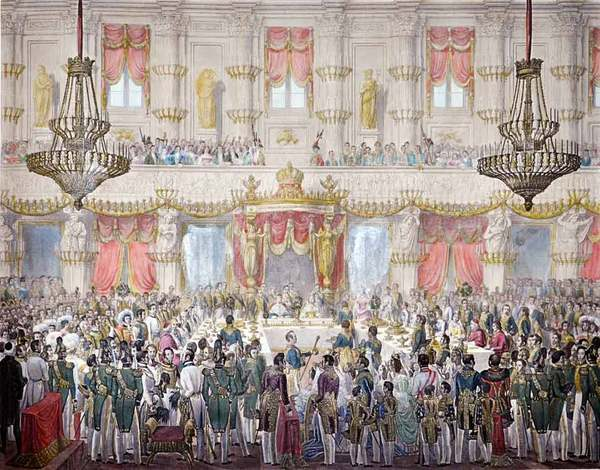
State banquet in Milan for the coronation of the Emperor Ferdinand I as King of Lombardy-Venetia, 1838. The few diners are seated, the bystanders will only watch the meal.

Several centuries ago the difficulties of travel and concerns over security made encounters between reigning monarchs, the main type of head of state, much less frequent, and if they took place at a place with sufficient facilities they were generally celebrated with an especially lavish feast in the prevailing style. The Banquet of the Five Kings in London in 1363 was an exceptional event, bringing together the kings of England, Scotland, France, Denmark and Cyprus. As at lesser dinners at court, the number of diners was often large, but the most important sat at a separate table, very often raised on a dais as a high table, and probably ate different food. Many state banquets celebrated royal weddings, which often had a foreign princess as the bride, and were major diplomatic events. The coronation feast was also especially lavish. During the Renaissance Italy tended to set the style for the rest of Europe, but when the format began to become standard in Europe during the Baroque era, it was the French court of Louis XIV that set the standards in most respects.

A distinct feature of Ancien Régime state banquets, like the most formal style of normal royal meals, was that the number of actual diners sitting down to eat was very small, and often they were all royal, but they were surrounded by a huge crowd of courtiers who just watched, sometimes being addressed by someone at the table. Otherwise the watchers were supposed to remain silent, as at the theatre. Often the bystanders on the floor of the room were all male, with the ladies of the court watching from galleries above. A single table was favoured, often U-shaped, with the diners generally all sitting on the outside, facing into the "U", the centre of which was used by those waiting upon the table. Highly formalized meals eaten in public by monarchs and their families were a feature of most monarchies, sometimes just a few times a year, but in France mostly more often. The event had a theatrical aspect, and served as a demonstration of rank and power. This style of dining disappeared in France at the French Revolution, only to reappear under Napoleon, at least as formal as before.

The typical modern style of state banquets, with a large number of guests, and only the waiting staff standing, was introduced by the soon-to-be King Louis Philippe I of France. When his son and heir married in May 1830, he invited 500 people to a banquet at the Chateau de Versailles, despite (or because of) the brewing constitutional crisis that led to the July Revolution weeks later, which made him king. The guests at the meal represented several types of important people rather than just courtiers, and this remains usually the case at modern banquets. Typically, but no longer in the United States, there is a single very large table, often "U" or E-shaped, with the host and most important guests together, and other guests stretching away at right-angles to them.

== By country ==
=== India ===
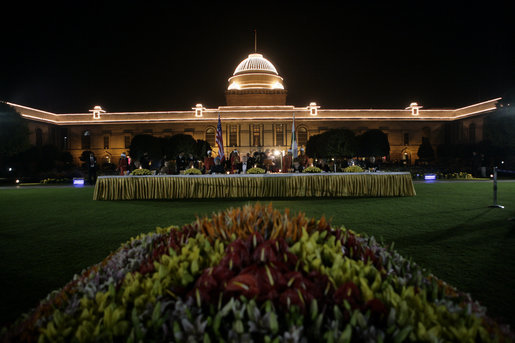
A state banquet held in honor of U.S. President George W. Bush in the Mughal Garden at the Rashtrapati Bhavan, 2006

In India, state banquets are held for foreign heads of state and government at the Rashtrapati Bhavan in New Delhi and are hosted by the President of India. Over one hundred guests usually attend state banquets, including members of the Government of India such as the Vice-President of India, the Prime Minister of India, and prominent members of the government. Indian and foreign business leaders also attend.

At the beginning of a state banquet, a foreign head of state is greeted by the president in the North Drawing Room. A tent constructed in the Mughal Garden within the environs of the presidential palace is the outdoor setting for state banquets, and The State Dining Room inside the Rashtrapati Bhavan serves as the main venue for all State Banquets. During the evening, the gardens are lit up with earthen diyas, string lights, and decorated with flowers and rangoli that become a scene for entertainment. After a performance by Rajasthani singers, Indian percussion instruments like the mridangam, tabla, ghatam and khanjeera, as well as India's diverse classical dances in which Bharatnatyam, Odissi and Kathak are carefully choreographed, will all be showcased in front of the guests.

Inside the tent, speeches highlighting bilateral diplomatic relations are delivered by the President of India and the foreign head of state. The guests are then offered a sumptuous meal of Indian delicacies while the Indian Navy Band performs music.

State banquets follow an official arrival ceremony which occurs at the Rashtrapati Bhavan earlier in the day.

=== Switzerland ===
In Switzerland, the head of the state is the Swiss Federal Council (not only its president). For this reason, the seven Federal Councillors (and their spouses) are invited to the state dinners organised in Bern during state visits.

=== United Kingdom ===
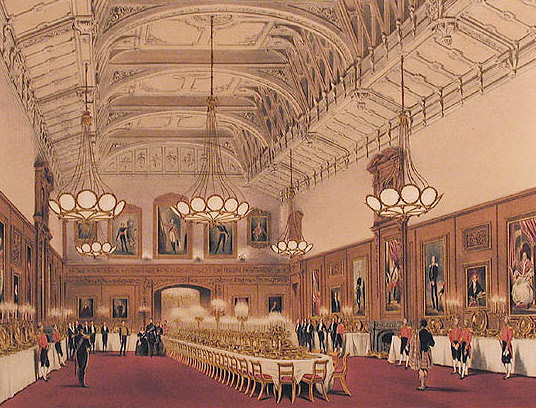
Queen Victoria and Prince Albert lead the guests into the Waterloo Chamber of Windsor Castle, c. 1844.

In the United Kingdom, state banquets are hosted by the British sovereign in their capacity as the head of state. State banquets are held at Buckingham Palace in London, or sometimes at Windsor Castle in Berkshire, if the visitors are staying there with the monarch. The ballroom at Buckingham Palace can seat some 170 diners, the number at the banquet for President Donald Trump in 2019. Guests typically include many of the royal family, a sizeable party brought by the visiting head of state, British politicians and leading figures in other fields, and notable people from the guest nation resident in the UK. The event is white tie, and decorations are worn.

A single table is used, and the room features the very traditional display of a "buffet of plate", with large silver-gilt dishes and vessels, never actually used, arranged in tiers on a cloth-covered "buffet" or sideboard.

Organisation of the state dinner usually falls to the Master of the Household. Preparations for state banquets begin months in advance with the final seating plan confirmed both by the King and the Foreign and Commonwealth Office. State banquets are usually held for visiting heads of state and are very elaborate: the meal is over four courses. These are: fish; main course, pudding and dessert (fruit, coffee and petit fours) and the 200-year-old 4,000 piece George IV gilt Grand Dining Service is used. Each place setting has six glasses (for water, red and white wine, dessert wine, champagne and port) and up to a dozen pieces of cutlery. The menu is chosen by the King from a choice of four presented by royal chefs. Alcoholic drinks are provided from the Government Wine Cellar, while the food is prepared by chefs of the Royal Household.

Preparations in the royal kitchens start as late as possible to ensure the food is fresh: every dish is prepared by hand from scratch. Prior to the commencement of the dinner, the table, settings, music and flowers are all inspected, checked and given final approval by the King personally.

Royal protocol is generally very strict but this has been played down over recent years. All speeches that are read are usually checked and confirmed by the Foreign Office, and amended where necessary. Gifts are exchanged by both parties.

=== United States ===
==== Introduction ====
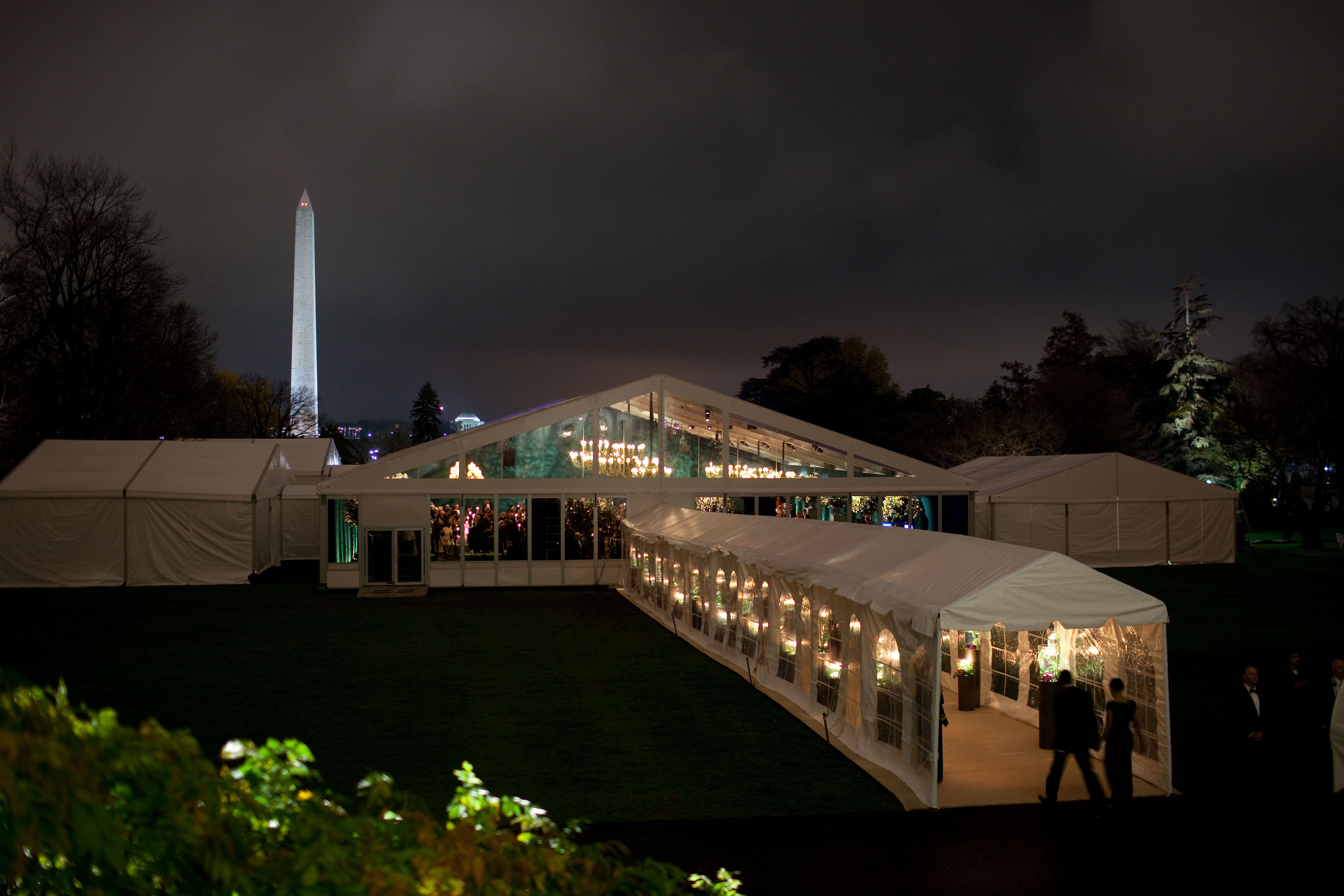
A tent located on the South Lawn was the venue for a state dinner held on the evening of 24 November 2009. President Barack Obama and First Lady Michelle Obama dined with Prime Minister Manmohan Singh of India and his wife, Gursharan Kaur.

In the United States, a state dinner is a formal dinner, more often black tie in recent years rather than white tie, which is held in honor of a foreign head of state, such as a king, queen, president, or any head of government. A state dinner is hosted by the President of the United States and held in the State Dining Room at the White House in Washington D.C. Other formal dinners for important people of other nations, such as a prince or princess, are called official dinners, the difference being that the federal government does not pay for them.

State and official dinners are dictated by strict protocol to ensure that no diplomatic gaffes occur. The Chief of Protocol of the United States, who is an official within the United States Department of State, the White House Chief Usher, who is head of the household staff at the White House, as well as the White House Social Secretary all oversee the planning of state and official dinners from beginning to end. The Graphics and Calligraphy Office previously located in the East Wing of the White House also bears numerous responsibilities. The White House Chief Calligrapher creates place cards with the names of the guests who are assigned seats around the tables in the State Dining Room. The Chief Calligrapher also designs and writes formal invitations that are mailed to the postal addresses of the guests. State dinners require close coordination between the White House Executive Chef and the White House Executive Pastry Chef who plan and prepare a four or five-course meal, as well as the White House Chief Floral Designer who arranges flowers and decorations on the candle-lit tables.

As is customary for all incoming state visits by foreign heads of state, a state dinner follows a State Arrival Ceremony which occurs on the South Lawn earlier in the day. In addition, state dinners held in recent years are also given media coverage by the public affairs TV channel, C-SPAN.

==== History ====
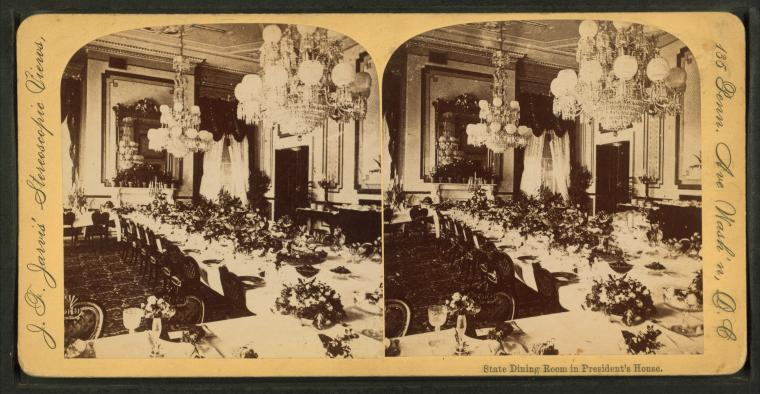
The State Dining Room at the White House as depicted in this 1850s stereoscopic view. Long banquet tables were used for state dinners before they were discarded in the 1960s by First Lady Jacqueline Kennedy in favor of round tables.

In the early 19th century, dinners honoring the president's Cabinet, Congress, or other dignitaries were called 'state dinners' even though they lacked official foreign representation. Under such conditions, large receptions and dinners were a rare occurrence as Washington, D.C., society was a collection of isolated villages widely separated and at times almost inaccessible. Times changed and so did the nation's capital as a series of state dinners were held every winter social season to honor Congress, the Supreme Court, and members of the diplomatic corps.

In the late 19th century, the term state dinner became synonymous with a dinner hosted by the president honoring a foreign head of state. The first visiting head of state to attend a state dinner at the White House was King David Kalakaua of the Kingdom of Hawaii, who was on a state visit of the United States, hosted by Ulysses S. Grant on 12 December 1874.

The restoration of the White House by the architectural firm McKim, Mead, and White in 1902 created a more proper setting for official entertainment to occur. When the president's office moved to the newly constructed West Wing, the Neoclassical remodeling of the Executive Residence's state rooms gave Theodore Roosevelt a perfect venue reflecting the United States' growing power and influence around the world. While the White House underwent a complete interior reconstruction from 1948 to 1952, Harry S. Truman and Bess Truman lived at Blair House and state dinners were held in local hotels in the nation's capital. Long banquet tables were always used in the State Dining Room prior to the administration of John F. Kennedy. However, these were permanently discarded by Jacqueline Kennedy and replaced with round tables which could seat a far greater number of guests, approximately 120 to 140, in such a tight and confined space. To this day, presidents and first ladies continue to add their own personal touches and flair in entertaining foreign guests of state at the White House, having full access to the vermeil collection of gilded candelabras and flatware, the President's House crystal pattern, as well as the priceless collection of White House china which dates from the James Monroe administration to the George W. Bush administration, for use at a state dinner.

==== Sequence of events ====
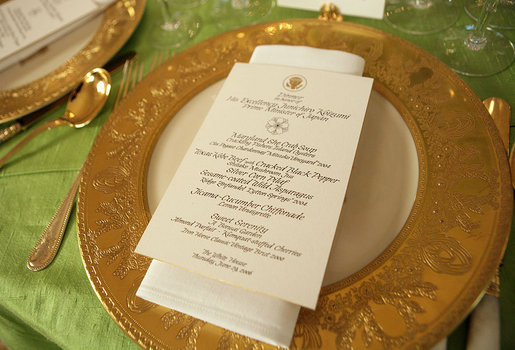
A calligraphed menu placed on top of the Clinton china service being used for a state dinner

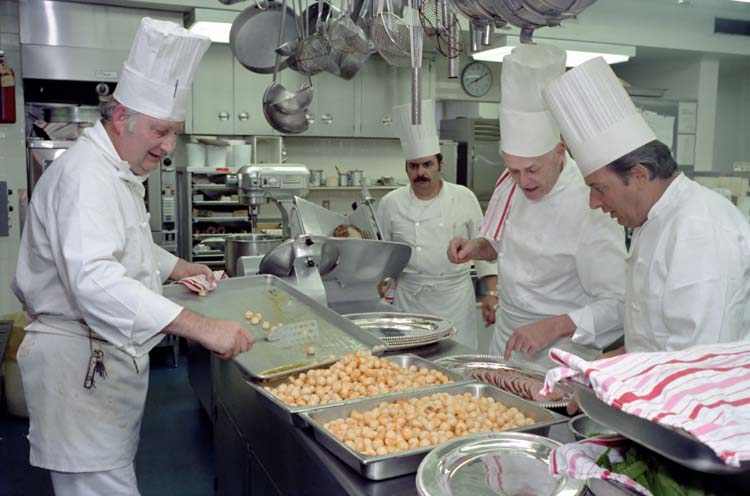
Under the direction of White House Executive Chef Henry Haller, chefs prepare food for a state dinner honoring Australian Prime Minister Malcolm Fraser in 1981.

During a state dinner, honor guards and color guards in full dress uniform from all branches of the United States Armed Forces are dispatched for ceremonial duty at the White House. At the North Portico entrance of the White House, the President of the United States and the First Lady of the United States formally greet the visiting head of state and their spouse, who have arrived in a motorcade from Blair House, the traditional guest quarters of foreign heads of state and dignitaries, or from a foreign ambassador's residence in the area of Embassy Row in Northwest, Washington, D.C. A brief photo opportunity for the media at the top of the staircase will occur. The president and first lady then escort the visiting head of state and their spouse to the Yellow Oval Room for a reception on the residence floor where the president's guests are served hors d'œuvres, cocktails, wine, or champagne. The president and first lady also introduce their guests to a wide array of people from the United States such as ambassadors, diplomats, members of Congress, members of the president's Cabinet, and other prominent people such as celebrities and Hollywood A-list movie stars invited at the discretion of the president and first lady.

After the informal reception in the Yellow Oval Room, the president and the foreign head of state, followed by the first lady and the foreign head of state's spouse, descend the Grand Staircase to the Entrance Hall on the state floor where they are met by the United States Marine Band, "The President's Own". Four ruffles and flourishes, immediately followed by Hail to the Chief, serves as the fanfare for the president's arrival. Often, the national anthem of the foreign head of state's country as well as the Star Spangled Banner are performed.

After a receiving line whereby the president introduces the visiting head of state to all of the invited guests, the president and the visiting head of state, their spouse, if there is one, and the first spouse, if there is one, walk down the Cross Hall and proceed to the State Dining Room where a four or five-course meal, typically consisting of an appetizer/soup, fish, meat, salad and dessert, are served to the guests. The menu planned for a state dinner and prepared by the White House Executive Chef and White House Executive Pastry Chef centers around the national cuisine of the visiting foreign head of state, using local ingredients, flavors, and ethnic foods. Before eating the meal, both the president and the visiting foreign head of state give a speech on a lectern, paying tribute to diplomatic relations between the United States and the foreign head of state's country. Members of the "Strolling Strings," violinists from the United States Marine Band "The President's Own," disperse throughout the State Dining Room and perform for the guests seated around the candle-lit tables. After the meal, the guests are seated in the East Room and are formally entertained by a musical ensemble such as a pianist, a singer, an orchestra, or band of national renown. On past occasions, dancing has also been a component at the conclusion of a state dinner.

== See also ==
- China Room
- List of dining events
- State Dining Room
- White House china
