= Pat Blair =

American calligrapher

Patricia Blair

White House Chief Calligrapher
- In office 2006–2018
- President: George W. Bush; Barack Obama; Donald Trump
- Preceded by: Rick Paulus
- Succeeded by: Lee Ann Clark

Patricia Ann Blair is an American calligrapher. She served as White House chief calligrapher and director of the Graphics and Calligraphy Office at the White House.

Blair's work has been published in Letter Arts Review, Scripsit, Martha Stewart Weddings, and Tabellae Ansatae. She is a member of the faculty of the Loudoun Academy of the Arts, and has been on the faculty of numerous International Calligraphy Conferences. Blair is past president of the Washington Calligraphers Guild, and was co-director of Letterforum, at the 26th International Calligraphy Conference.

In 2005, Pat Blair was awarded the honor "Master Penman" by the International Association of Master Penmen, Engrossers and Teachers of Handwriting for her Spencerian round hand style of script used in White House invitations.

In March 2013, Blair's over $96,000 annual salary, and the salary of her two deputy calligraphers, became a source of debate when published by the White House and reported online.
