= Howell G. Crim =

American civil servant

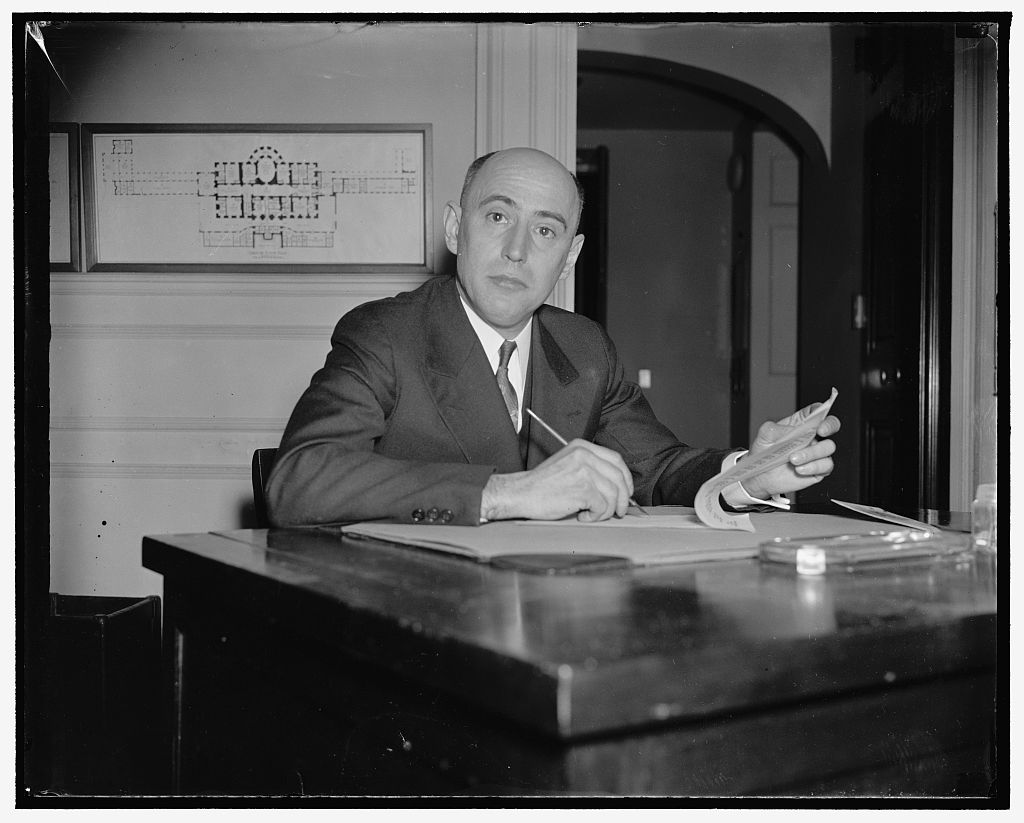
- Crim at his desk in the Chief Usher's office at the White House

5th White House Chief Usher
- In office 1938–1957
- President: Franklin D. Roosevelt; Harry S. Truman; Dwight D. Eisenhower
- Preceded by: Raymond Muir
- Succeeded by: James B. West

Personal details
- Born: October 2, 1898; Sharpsburg, Maryland, U.S.
- Died: May 11, 1959 (aged 60); Bethesda, Maryland, U.S.

Howell Gardner Crim (October 2, 1898 – May 11, 1959) was an American civil servant best known for being the Chief Usher of the White House in Washington, D.C., from 1938 to 1957.

== Early life ==
Howell Gardner Crim was born October 2, 1898, in Sharpsburg, Maryland, to William and Mary (née Hoffmaster) Crim. His maternal grandmother was Margaret "Maggie" (née Grice) Hoffmaster, who, as a child, famously hid in a cave with her family while the Battle of Antietam raged around them on September 17, 1862. His maternal grandfather, Benjamin Franklin Hoffmaster, was one of the first rural mail carriers in Washington County, Maryland.

Little is known about Crim's upbringing or education, although the National Park Service asserts he was an attorney. The Hagerstown Daily Mail, Crim's hometown newspaper, reported that he left the United States in his late teens and traveled and worked abroad for some years until joining the United States Navy during World War I.

Crim joined the staff of the Veterans' Bureau (the forerunner to the United States Department of Veterans Affairs) in 1919. While working there during the Calvin Coolidge administration, he was asked to join the White House staff. About to be married, Crim declined due to the long hours required. Crim married Catherine Long (also spelled Katherine Long), and the couple had two children: Howell Gardner Crim, Jr. and Catherine Isabelle Crim. The couple divorced some time before 1946.

== White House years ==
Crim left the Veteran's Bureau in the fall of 1930 to join the White House staff. The White House had asked for two people with military experience to become ushers. One would take a newly created position as Assistant Chief Usher to Chief Usher Irwin "Ike" H. Hoover, while the other would be hired into an existing position as assistant usher. Raymond Muir was named to the former position, while Crim took the assistant usher job.

Ike Hoover died suddenly of a heart attack on September 14, 1933, and Muir was named his successor on September 18. Crim was promoted to Assistant Chief Usher. But unlike Hoover, who spent 24 years as Chief Usher, Muir's tenure in the position was not a long one. Muir left the White House in April 1938 to join the State Department, and Howell Crim was named Chief Usher on April 4, 1938. As Chief Usher, Crim oversaw the operation of the White House and its staff. He had intimate daily contact with the President and First Family, oversaw all White House social affairs (formal and informal), and oversaw the reception and housing of heads of state, heads of government, diplomats, and other guests (important and not) at the White House. He was portrayed by actor Richard Roat in the 1979 NBC mini-series Backstairs at the White House.

== Death ==
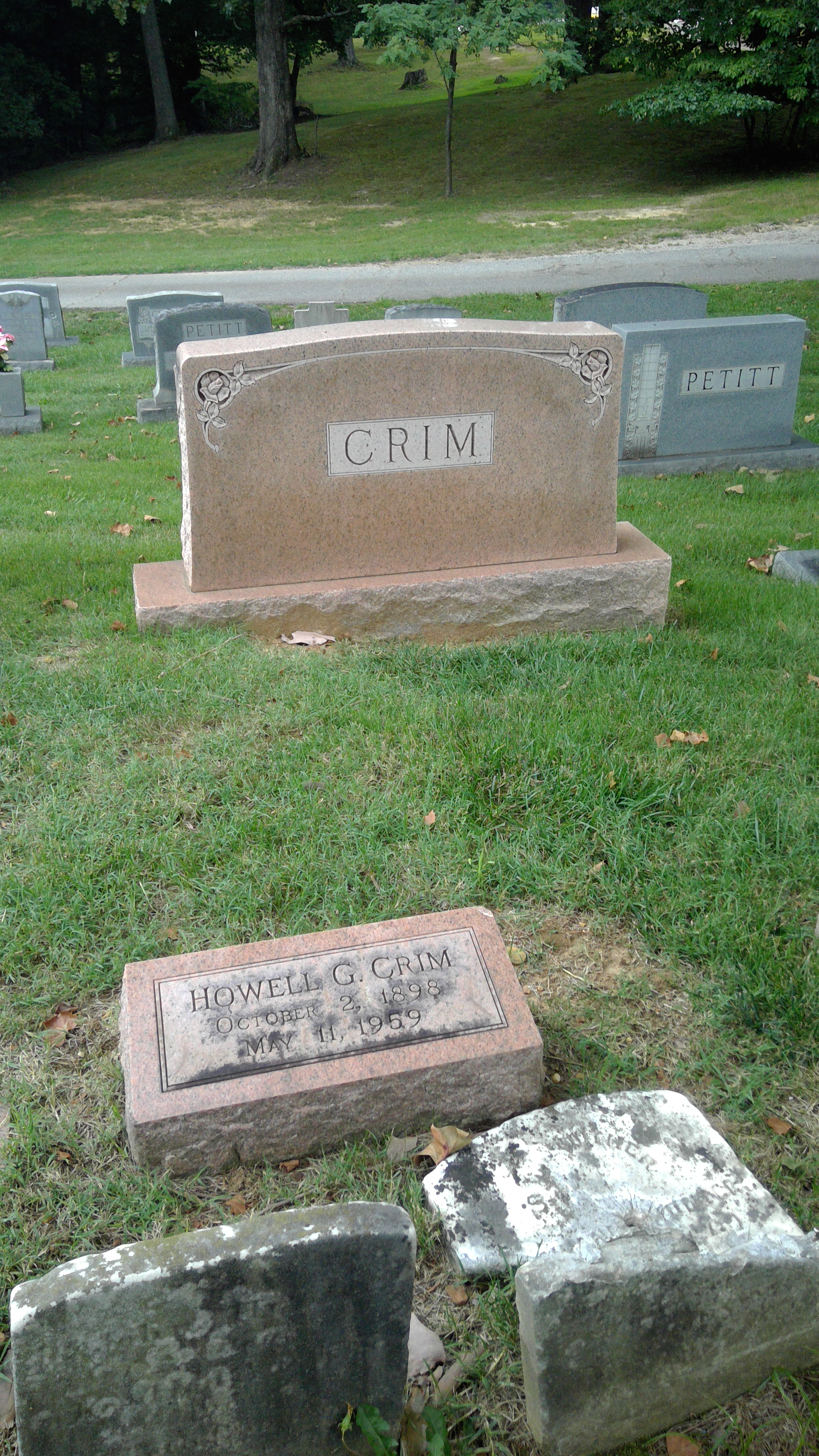
Crim family plot, with grave marker for Howell Crim in foreground

Crim's health began to deteriorate in the 1950s. He was hospitalized in April and May 1953 for four weeks, probably due to a heart attack. His health continued to worsen over the next few years. Crim finally retired in June 1957, and J. B. West was named his successor. Crim retired to his farm in Fairfax County, Virginia, where he grew roses.

Howell Crim died at Bethesda Naval Hospital in Bethesda, Maryland, on May 11, 1959. The cause of death was reported to be blood and heart problems. He was survived by his wife, Sadie, (Note: The couple married on November 14, 1946. She was the sister of a White House policeman, B. Beltran Bradley.) and children Catherine Isabelle Crim Hall and Howell G. Crim, Jr. He was interred at Pohick Episcopal Church Cemetery in Lorton, Virginia.
