= J. B. West =

American civil servant, 6th Chief Usher of the White House

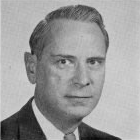
- J. B. West, 1959

6th White House Chief Usher
- In office June 2, 1957 – March 1, 1969
- President: Dwight D. Eisenhower; John F. Kennedy; Lyndon B. Johnson; Richard Nixon
- Preceded by: Howell G. Crim
- Succeeded by: Rex Scouten

Assistant to the White House Chief Usher
- In office March 1, 1941 – June 2, 1957
- President: Franklin D. Roosevelt; Harry S. Truman; Dwight D. Eisenhower
- Leader: Howell G. Crim
- Preceded by: Raymond Muir
- Succeeded by: Rex Scouten

Personal details
- Born: July 27, 1912 Afton, Iowa, U.S.
- Died: July 18, 1983 (aged 70) Arlington County, Virginia, U.S.
- Occupation: White House Chief Usher

James Bernard West (July 27, 1912 – July 18, 1983) was the 6th Chief Usher of the White House serving from 1957 to 1969. His best-selling book, Upstairs at the White House: My Life with the First Ladies (with Mary Lynn Kotz), documents his time in the executive mansion and is considered a good source of material on the First Families he served.

== Biography ==
West was born in Afton, Iowa, on July 27, 1912, to William and Sarah (née McVey) West. He graduated from Creston High School in 1930 and moved to Washington in 1939, where he worked in the Veterans Administration.

West began work in the White House as assistant to the chief usher, Howell G. Crim, on March 1, 1941. He was promoted to Chief Usher when Crim retired in 1957. He was responsible for taking care of all activities occurring in the Executive Residence.

Letitia Baldrige, First Lady Jacqueline Kennedy's social secretary, called him "the miracle maker of the White House". Mrs. Kennedy herself gave him a vermeil cigarette case inscribed "With deep appreciation for Jan. 20, 1961 - Nov. 22, 1963" with the following letter:

Dear Mr. West,

This little gold box is a sad substitute for the Citation of Merit which President Kennedy was going to give you this last Fourth of July, for all that you did for your country for so many years, serving four Presidents with such extraordinary energy, tact and devotion. I had it made early this year when I knew he would never be able to give it to you himself in his beloved Rose Garden, which you also made possible. Dear Mr. West, you can imagine the words President Kennedy would have said about you in the Citation. I was looking forward with such joy to hearing him that day and to seeing you, whose passion is anonymity, and whose contribution has never been known except by Presidents. But please accept some additional words from me—you, more than anyone else, made our brief years in the White House so full of happiness. I will be grateful to you forever for all that you did for him, his last years were his happiest ones in spite of all the agony of the decisions he had to make in those years. Neither you nor I will ever forget him. Please accept this from me in lieu of so much more, in memory of President Kennedy and with the devotion of both of us.

Sincerely, Jacqueline Kennedy

West oversaw the transition of Johnson to the White House following Kennedy's assassination.

With a staff of 72 and budget of $750,000, West oversaw the day-to-day operation of the White House, the executive mansion's maintenance and renovation, and planning and execution of both formal and informal White House events. These included the funeral of John F. Kennedy and the wedding of Lynda Bird Johnson.

West announced his retirement from the White House on November 14, 1968. West left the White House on March 1, 1969.

Although West said he had no intention of writing his memoirs, in 1973 he wrote Upstairs at the White House: My Life With the First Ladies. It became a best-seller. Jonathan Yardley of The Washington Post later characterized West's book as one of two of the most useful memoirs written by a White House staffer, President, First Lady, or member of the First Family.

West died on July 18, 1983, at Northern Virginia Doctors Hospital (now Virginia Hospital Center) in Arlington County, Virginia, of respiratory failure. He was survived by his wife of 40 years, Zella, and his daughters Sally West and Kathy West Langhoff.

== Bibliography ==
- Kessler, Ronald (1996). Inside the White House. New York: Simon and Schuster. ISBN 9780671879198.
- West, J.B.; Kotz, Mary Lynn (1973). Upstairs at the White House: My Life With the First Ladies. New York: Coward, McCann & Geoghegan. ISBN 069810546X.
