= William DuBois =

William DuBois may refer to:

- William DuBois (architect) (1879–1953), American architect and politician based in Cheyenne, Wyoming
- William Dubois (usher) (1841–1910), Chief Usher of the White House, 1881–1902
- William DuBois (writer) (1903–1997), American playwright, novelist, and editor of The New York Times Book Review
- William Edward Burghardt Du Bois (1868–1963), American sociologist, historian, and civil rights activist
- William H. Dubois (1835–1907), Vermont businessman and political figure
- William Pène du Bois (1916–1993), French-American author and illustrator
