= Edson S. Densmore =

American civil servant

- Illustration of Edson Densmore in 1881

White House Chief Usher
- In office 1887–1887
- President: Grover Cleveland
- Succeeded by: John McKenna
- In office March 1889 – November 13, 1892
- President: Benjamin Harrison
- Preceded by: John McKenna
- Succeeded by: Carlos E. Dexter

Personal details
- Born: c. 1849 Chelsea, Vermont, U.S.
- Died: November 13, 1892 (aged 42–43) Washington, D.C., U.S.

Edson S. Densmore (c. 1849 – November 13, 1892) was an American civil servant who served as a Doorkeeper to the President of the United States from 1885 to 1887, and as Chief Usher of the White House in Washington, D.C., briefly in 1887 and again from March 1889 until his death in November 1892.

== Early life and police career ==
Edson S. Densmore (Note: His first name is sometimes misspelled "Eldon", and his last name is frequently misspelled "Dinsmore"—even within the same newspaper article.) was born about 1849 in Chelsea, Vermont to William and Lydia A. Densmore. His father was a farmer, and he had at least two siblings: Milton (born in 1840) and Jason (born in 1846). Some time before 1860, his mother went insane, and Densmore ran away from home in 1861 to live with Chelsea residents Franklin and Sylvia Dearborn, their teenage daughter, and Dearborn's aged mother. His schooling was minimal.

By 1870, Densmore was living in Washington, D.C., where he worked as a carpenter and had married Emma A. Roberts. Their union produced two daughters, Annie and Elsie. In 1872, he joined the Metropolitan Police Department of the District of Columbia (MPD). Tall, handsome, muscular, and intelligent, Densmore was often the point-man the D.C. police turned to for their most difficult cases. President Ulysses S. Grant specifically asked the MPD to assign Densmore to break up the District of Columbia's gambling dens on E Street NW. After his successes there, the MPD promoted him to sergeant. He was then assigned to the Willard Hotel and asked to break up a gang of gentlemen thieves who broke into wealthy people's rooms and stole money and jewels. Densmore ingratiated himself with the thieves, and broke the robbery ring. His incredible ability to remember faces and names proved critical in convicting the criminals. Offered a promotion to lieutenant, Densmore turned it down as he wanted to keep working on city streets rather than supervising others.

== White House Usher ==
Having been assigned to guard the White House several times during the presidency of Rutherford B. Hayes, Densmore resigned from the MPD on March 11, 1885, and joined the White House staff as a doorkeeper. Two years later, he was promoted to usher. It is likely that he was given the role of chief usher immediately. (Note: The Evening Star said in 1892 that President Grover Cleveland appointed him chief usher, although the newspaper was not clear if this was during Cleveland's first administration (1885-1889) or his second (1893-1897). However, the same newspaper said in 1887 that Col. McKenna replaced Densmore as chief usher, leading to the conclusion that Densmore's appointment as chief usher had occurred during the first Cleveland administration. The New York Times also said that Densmore had been "restored" to his position of chief usher.) Although the role of usher had once only been to escort people from the entrance to the President, by 1887 it had become much more: "[Densmore] was the medium between the president and the hundreds who came by to see him, and had entire control the house. His rare gifts of insight into men and their motives, as well as his tact and discretion, rendered him invaluable for the performance of the delicate and responsible duties of his position, and he enjoyed the confidence and personal friendship of some of the most distinguished men in the country."

Densmore's marriage was a troubled one, and he divorced his wife in 1886. At the time, divorce was difficult to obtain short of proving adultery or violence. Densmore won his divorce by claiming that his wife had no interest in maintaining a home, smoked cigars and used chewing tobacco, was cruel and temperamental, and failed to care for him during a serious illness. Densmore sued for divorce in mid-July 1886, which was granted in December. Emma Densmore was awarded custody of their children, but Edson sued—arguing that his wife was an unfit mother and that his eldest daughter was forced to work in a photography shop by her mother. The Supreme Court of the District of Columbia denied his petition in October 1888, strongly condemning the award of divorce in dicta.

For reasons of ill health, Densmore resigned as White House usher in late July 1887. His successor was "Colonel" John McKenna. Sources differ on where Densmore lived and what he did for employment for the next two years. The Washington Post claimed he worked for a travel agency in Pittsburgh, Pennsylvania. But his home town newspaper said he went to work for Simonda Rolling-Machine Company in Fitchburg, Massachusetts, and lived at the Fitchburg Hotel. (The New York Times also reported that he returned to Fitchburg.)

Densmore was asked to rejoin the White House in February 1889 in order to oversee preparations for the inauguration of President-elect Benjamin Harrison. President Harrison asked Densmore to stay on as chief usher on his very first day in office. Densmore agreed, and according to the Fitchburg Sentinel he was the first official of the Harrison administration to be sworn in. Unfortunately, ill health soon ended Densmore's tenure as chief usher. He suffered from Bright's disease, and fell seriously ill in May 1892. He gave up his White House duties temporarily, and traveled to Fitchburg, Massachusetts, and Lebanon, New Hampshire, to recuperate with friends and family. He recovered occasionally over the next five months, but fell ill again shortly after each recovery. At the end of October 1892, Densmore fell so ill that his friends feared for his life.

== Death ==
Edson S. Densmore died of Bright's disease on November 13, 1892. He was survived by his daughters, Annie and Elsie, and his brother Jason (Note: Densmore may also have had a sister, Mrs. David Henderson of Concord, Massachusetts, whom he visited once a year.) Jason was by his side at the deathbed. Densmore was a member of Foundry Methodist Episcopal Church (now Foundry United Methodist Church). His funeral, held at the church, was attended by numerous members of Congress and representatives from the White House staff. Densmore was interred at Glenwood Cemetery in Washington, D.C.
