= Pickard China =

American porcelain manufacturer

- Industry: Ceramic manufacturing
- Founded: 1893
- Founder: Wilder Austin Pickard
- Headquarters: Antioch, Illinois, U.S.
- Key people: Andrew Pickard Morgan
- Products: Tableware
- Website: www.pickardchina.com

Pickard China is an American porcelain decorating and manufacturing company in Antioch, Illinois, United States. The company was founded in 1893, and continues to produce ceramic tableware and art ware today.

== History ==
Pickard China was incorporated in Edgerton, Wisconsin, in 1893. Wilder Austin Pickard (1857–1939) started the company in 1894 by offering his customers hand-painted giftware, artware, and eventually dinnerware. He moved the company to Chicago in 1897. The company was originally called Pickard China Studio and it specialized in hand-decorating dessert and tea sets.

Pickard assembled a group of men and women china painters, many emigrating from Europe, to create this uniquely American style of hand-painted china. Many of the company's original artists were from the Art Institute of Chicago.

Pickard first relied on porcelain that was manufactured in Europe. Blank plates were imported and then decorate in Pickard's studio. When Wilder Pickard's son Austin Pickard joined the company, he decided Pickard would begin manufacturing its blank plates and dishes. In 1930, the company's first experimental china was made. Pickard also worked toward making its own glazes. In 1937, after the experimentation was complete, a production facility was opened in Antioch, Illinois.

Austin's son, Henry A. "Pete" Pickard, was the third generation to enter the family business, serving as the company's president from 1966 until his retirement in 1994. Pete's brother-in-law, Eben C. Morgan II, succeeded him as president, holding that position until shortly before his death in June 2008. Richard E. Morgan and Andrew Pickard Morgan, the founder's great-grandsons, both joined the company and represent the family's fourth generation in the business.

Pickard, Inc., remains a family-owned business. The company's sales are primarily in fine china dinnerware, decorative accessories and collectibles.

== Official sets ==
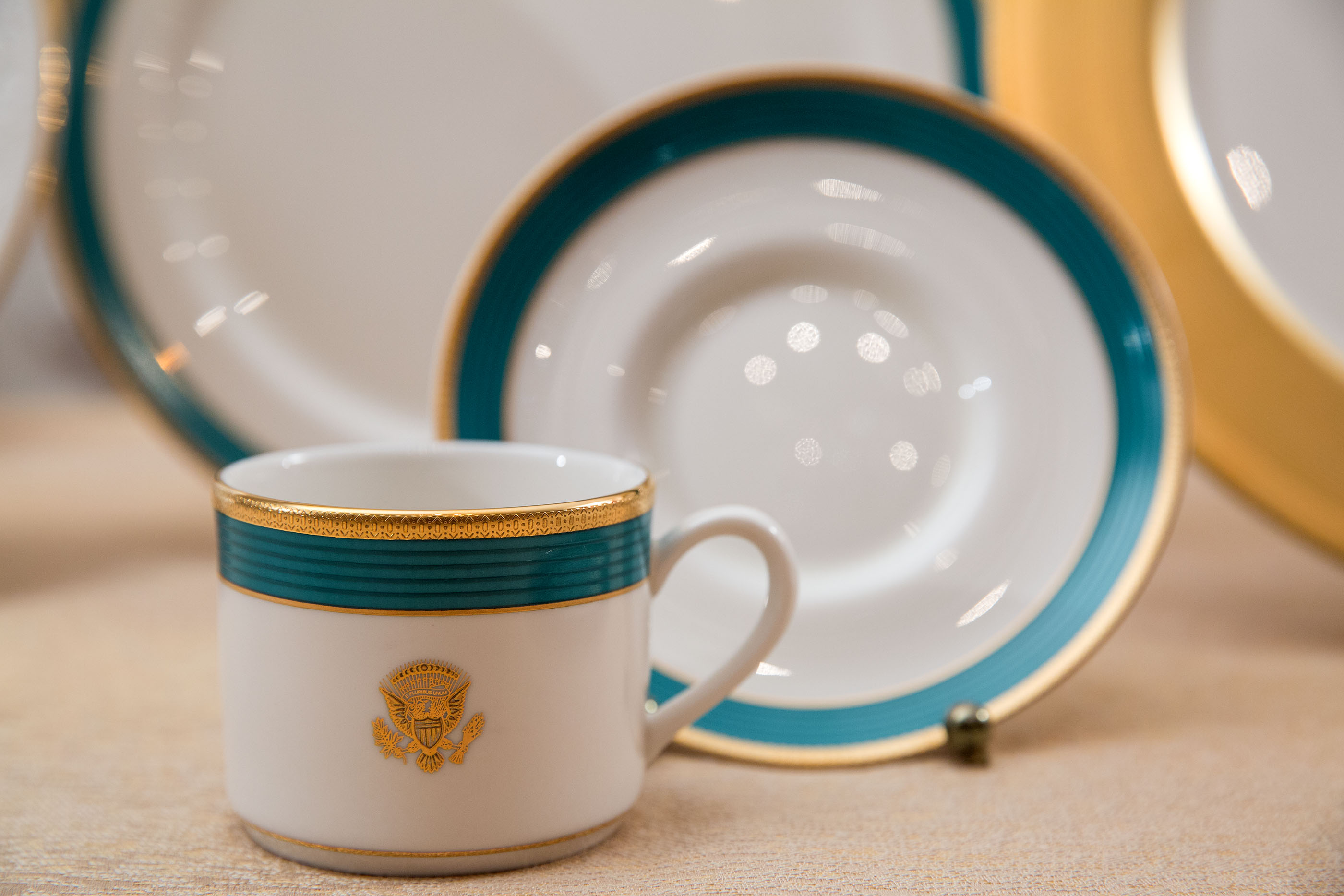
Barack Obama White House state china

In 1977, Pickard was selected by the U.S. Department of State to manufacture the official china service used by American embassies and other diplomatic missions around the world. This service's special decoration includes an embossed gold border of stars and stripes and an embossed reproduction of the Great Seal of the United States. Pickard was also selected to produce exclusive fine china services for heads of state, corporations, and hotels, including the King of Saudi Arabia, Hilton Hotels, Sheraton Hotels and Resorts, Marriott Corporation, General Motors, the U.S. Air Force, New York's Gracie Mansion, the United Nations, Air Force One, Blair House and Camp David.

The 3,520-piece Obama State China service was introduced on April 27, 2015.
