= Carlos E. Dexter =

Chief Usher of the White House from 1893 to 1895

White House Chief Usher
- In office March 1893 – December 1895
- President: Grover Cleveland
- Preceded by: John McKenna
- Succeeded by: William Dubois

Personal details
- Born: c. 1842; Three Rivers, Michigan, U.S.
- Died: May 7, 1919 (aged 76–77)

Carlos E. Dexter Jr. (c. 1842 – May 7, 1919) was an American civil servant who served a Chief Usher of the White House in Washington, D.C., from March 1893 to December 1895.

== Life and career ==
He was born in Three Rivers, Michigan, about 1842. He grew up in Monterey and Heath, Michigan. He served in the American Civil War as a soldier in Company G of the 6th Michigan Volunteer Infantry Regiment, but was discharged on June 6, 1863, after being severely wounded. Although his rank at the time of his discharge is not known, he probably remained in the Michigan reserves. Press reports later in life listed his final rank as captain. He married Adelia Dexter, and had several children, including daughters Birdie, Adelia (or "Addie"), and Maude and sons Carlos Jr., George, and Paul. In 1880 he was working as a sash and door manufacturer in Three Rivers.

From 1882 to 1886, Dexter served as sheriff of St. Joseph County, Michigan. In January 1888, United States Postmaster General Donald M. Dickinson appointed Dexter to the position of postal inspector. He remained in this post until his resignation in August 1889. In late March 1890 was appointed town marshal of the city of Three Rivers, Michigan.

At some point after 1890, Dexter became an inspector for the United States Post Office Department in Washington, D.C. The patronage position was obtained from him by Henry T. Thurber, private secretary to President Grover Cleveland, and Postmaster General Dickinson.

Dexter was appointed chief usher of the White House on March 20, 1893. His tenure there was exceptionally brief, lasting until his resignation on December 3, 1895.

Dexter's resignation was prompted by his reappointment as a postal inspector. Dexter moved to Philadelphia, Pennsylvania, where in January 1896 he broke a postal fraud ring involving the United States Merchant Marine. He later served as a postal inspector in Greensboro, North Carolina. In 1899 he was transferred from Greensboro to New York City.

Little is known of his later life or career. It is certain he was still alive in October 1918. Carlos died in 1919 in Milwaukee, Wisconsin and was buried in Riverside Cemetery, Three Rivers, Michigan.
