= Thomas E. Stone =

American civil servant

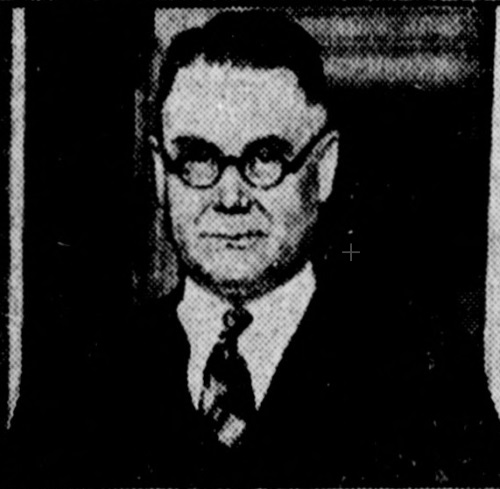
- Thomas E. Stone in May 1929

2nd White House Chief Usher
- In office February 21, 1901 – 1909
- President: William McKinley; Theodore Roosevelt
- Preceded by: William Dubois
- Succeeded by: Irwin "Ike" H. Hoover

Personal details
- Born: July 31, 1869 Leonardtown, Maryland, U.S.
- Died: June 26, 1959 (aged 89) Washington, D.C., U.S.

Thomas E. Stone (July 31, 1869 – June 26, 1959) was an American civil servant who served as Chief Usher of the White House in Washington, D.C., from 1901 to 1909. Beginning in 1912, Stone worked as an Internal Revenue agent for the United States Department of the Treasury, where he won national acclaim for breaking major crime rings and capturing individuals who had fled from justice. He helped set up enforcement of Prohibition in several states in 1920, and helped break the largest illegal alcohol production ring in the United States in 1925. He served in a wide variety of positions with the Bureau of Prohibition, including chief of the 7th District (covering Maryland and the District of Columbia) from 1929 until his retirement in 1934.

== Early life and White House years ==
Stone was born in Leonardtown, Maryland, on July 31, 1869, to William Martin Van Buren and Mary Ann (née Wilkerson) Stone. He was the third of eight children, and a descendant of Thomas Stone (an American planter and lawyer who signed the United States Declaration of Independence as a delegate for Maryland and later worked on the committee that formed the Articles of Confederation in 1777). He was educated in the local public schools.

Stone moved to Washington, D.C., about 1887. He held a number of jobs, none of them important or lasting for very long. Beginning about 1894, Stone joined the Pullman Company, where he was in charge of chartered trains serving VIPs and special event trains in the D.C. area. Stone personally served as a conductor on the first Pullman railroad car journey ever taken by William McKinley after he became President of the United States in 1897. He subsequently oversaw all of McKinley's Pullman trips (except for the fatal final one). McKinley was so impressed with Stone's organizational work that he asked him to come to the White House and take a position as an usher—one of the high-level administrators who helped run the White House and meet the First Family's needs. Stone was appointed usher on February 21, 1901. Stone subsequently traveled with the McKinleys on their long cross-continent trip to San Francisco in the summer of 1901.

Stone worked under Chief Usher Captain William Dubois. Dubois' health, however, was not good, and some time in 1901 Dubois temporarily left his position to recover. Stone was appointed acting chief usher in his place. Dubois' health did not improve, however, and in late December 1901 he asked to be transferred to an executive branch department. Stone was appointed Chief Usher on January 2, 1902, after Dubois' request for a transfer was approved. Stone was the first individual to have the official title of "Chief Usher" bestowed on him throughout his tenure. (Note: The term "chief usher" had been used by press as early as August 1887, indicating that one of the ushers was considered the "chief" or supervisory usher. The official title, "Chief Usher", was not created until 1897. Dubois was the first to use the title, but it applied only for the last four of his five years in the role.)

In 1902, the usher staff was greatly expanded. The North Portico was closed as a public entrance and now served only for official guests and visitors. The usher's office, which was adjacent to the Entrance Hall, no longer could control the influx of visitors, so the usher staff, as well as White House police force, was almost doubled to handle the new duties. Stone supervised the dozen or so "inside" officers on the police force.

Stone left the Chief Usher's position on March 5, 1909, when he was appointed Doorkeeper to the President of the United States. He replaced Major Charles D.A. Loeffler, who had been Doorkeeper since 1869.

== Leading Prohibition enforcer ==
Stone left the White House in 1912 due to poor health, and became an Internal Revenue agent with a roving commission with the United States Department of the Treasury. In June 1915, Treasury agents discovered that Knox Both, an Internal Revenue agent in Tennessee, had stolen more than $383,000 in alcohol tax revenues and helped protect an illegal liquor production syndicate that generated more than $2 million a year. Stone was assigned to track him down. He succeeded in doing so (although Booth died of a heart attack before standing trial). For the next five years, Stone was often assigned the toughest cases, or those in which high-ranking criminals had fled. The Washington Post called him "the Javert of internal revenue".

Prohibition was enacted in the United States in 1919, and in 1920 Stone moved into a law enforcement role, helping to enforce the Volstead Act. When Prohibition took effect, it was initially enforced by the Bureau of Internal Revenue (BIR) in the Department of the Treasury. A Commissioner of Prohibition was established to oversee enforcement efforts within the BIR, (Note: From November 1, 1925 to May 20, 1927, a Director Prohibition also existed within the Department of the Treasury, with nearly equal powers and jurisdiction over Prohibition enforcement efforts.) and the nation was divided geographically into 12 enforcement districts. An Assistant Secretary of the Treasury coordinated the enforcement efforts of the BIR, the United States Customs Bureau, and the United States Coast Guard. Each U.S. state was given the authority to supervise legal production of alcohol (such as low-alcohol beer or alcohol used for religious or industrial purposes), although not every state did so. In early 1920, Stone helped organize the enforcement machinery in the District of Columbia, Maryland, Ohio, and West Virginia, and supervised enforcement efforts in Alabama, Florida, Georgia, Michigan, New York, and Tennessee. From 1920 to 1921, Stone served as a Prohibition Unit enforcement agent, chief of the enforcement division for the District of Maryland and Ohio, and supervising national prohibition agent His position as supervising agent was abolished in 1921, and he was placed in charge of the Atlanta division of the Income Tax Unit. Stone remained in that position at least until 1924. When mass corruption was uncovered in the Wisconsin district in 1924, Stone left Atlanta and was appointed Acting Director of Prohibition for the state, where he remained at least until the end of the year.

On April 1, 1925, Assistant Secretary Lincoln Clark Andrews reorganized the enforcement districts, creating 24 districts organized along the same geographic lines as the federal district courts. Stone was named director of the Tenth District. His work was publicly praised by Senator William S. Kenyon (R-Iowa), a member of the National Commission on Law Observance and Enforcement which was formed in 1931 to investigate Prohibition enforcement efforts. In August 1925, Stone led a raid in Cleveland, Ohio, that broke the Superior Industrial Alcohol Co. That company had been illegally manufacturing drinking alcohol, conservatively making $200 million a year. The case against Superior Industrial Alcohol led to the indictment of 112 people—the most people ever indicted for a single crime in U.S. history to that time. He also secured the conspiracy conviction of J. Edward Russell, the Prohibition administrator for the state of Ohio and a former member of the United States House of Representatives.

In late March 1926, Stone was appointed national Supervisor of Brewery Control, and returned to Washington, D.C. Stone resigned this position in early August 1926.

Congress reorganized Prohibition enforcement efforts on March 3, 1927, with the Bureau of Prohibition Act. The act established a new Bureau of Prohibition in the Department of the Treasury, to be overseen by the existing Commissioner of Prohibition. As part of this reorganization, an enforcement district covering just the state of Michigan was created. Stone was appointed administrator for Michigan and for a time took up residence in the city of Detroit. In 1928, Stone spent $400,000 on enforcement but imposed fines of more than $1 million for illegal liquor production and sales, and alcohol smuggling in the state dropped by two-thirds. Stone spent almost two years in Detroit before he was named administrator of the 7th District (which covered both Maryland and the District of Columbia) on October 21, 1929. As part of his work as Supervisory Prohibition Agent in Baltimore, Stone was in charge of issuing alcohol withdrawal permits. (Note: Under the original Prohibition enforcement scheme, state-appointed Directors of Prohibition were able to give pharmacists, pharmaceutical manufacturers, and industrial concerns the right to sell alcohol at the wholesale or retail level for use in making pharmaceuticals. On March 1, 1921, the Bureau of Internal Revenue issued new regulations that required the approval of the federal Supervising Prohibition Agent in each district. These approvals were known as "alcohol withdrawal permits".) He was unsuccessfully sued for denying such permits in 1930.

== Retirement and death ==
Stone remained in the 7th District as Supervisory Prohibition Agent until his retirement in 1934.

Thomas E. Stone died at the age of 89 from natural causes at his home in Washington, D.C., on June 26, 1959. He was survived by his son, Thomas E. Stone, Jr., and his daughter, Evelyn Stone Thomaides. He was interred at Cedar Hill Cemetery in Suitland, Maryland.

== Bibliography ==
- Anthony, Carl Sferrazza (1990). First Ladies: The Saga of the Presidents' Wives and Their Power, 1789-1961. New York: Quill/William Morrow. ISBN 0688112722.
- Committee on the Judiciary (1926). The National Prohibition Law. Vol. 2. 69th Cong., 1st sess (Report). Washington, D.C.: U.S. Government Printing Office. hdl:2027/mdp.39015071649383.
- National Commission on Law Observance and Enforcement (1931). Enforcement of the Prohibition Laws of the United States. Washington, D.C.: U.S. Government Printing Office. hdl:2027/mdp.39015071649342.
- Pendel, Thomas F. (2008). Thirty-Six Years in the White House. Bedford, Mass.: Applewood Books. ISBN 9781557099235.
- Select Committee on Investigation of the Bureau of Internal Revenue (1924). Investigation of Bureau of Internal Revenue: Hearings Before the Select Committee on Investigation of the Bureau of Internal Revenue. Part 3. 68th Cong., 1st sess (Report). Washington, D.C.: Government Printing Office. hdl:2027/mdp.39015016744859.
- United States Civil Service Commission (1902). Eighteenth Report of the United States Civil Service Commission, July 1, 1900 to June 30, 1901. Washington, D.C.: Government Printing Office.
