= White House Chief Usher =

Position in the residence of the US President

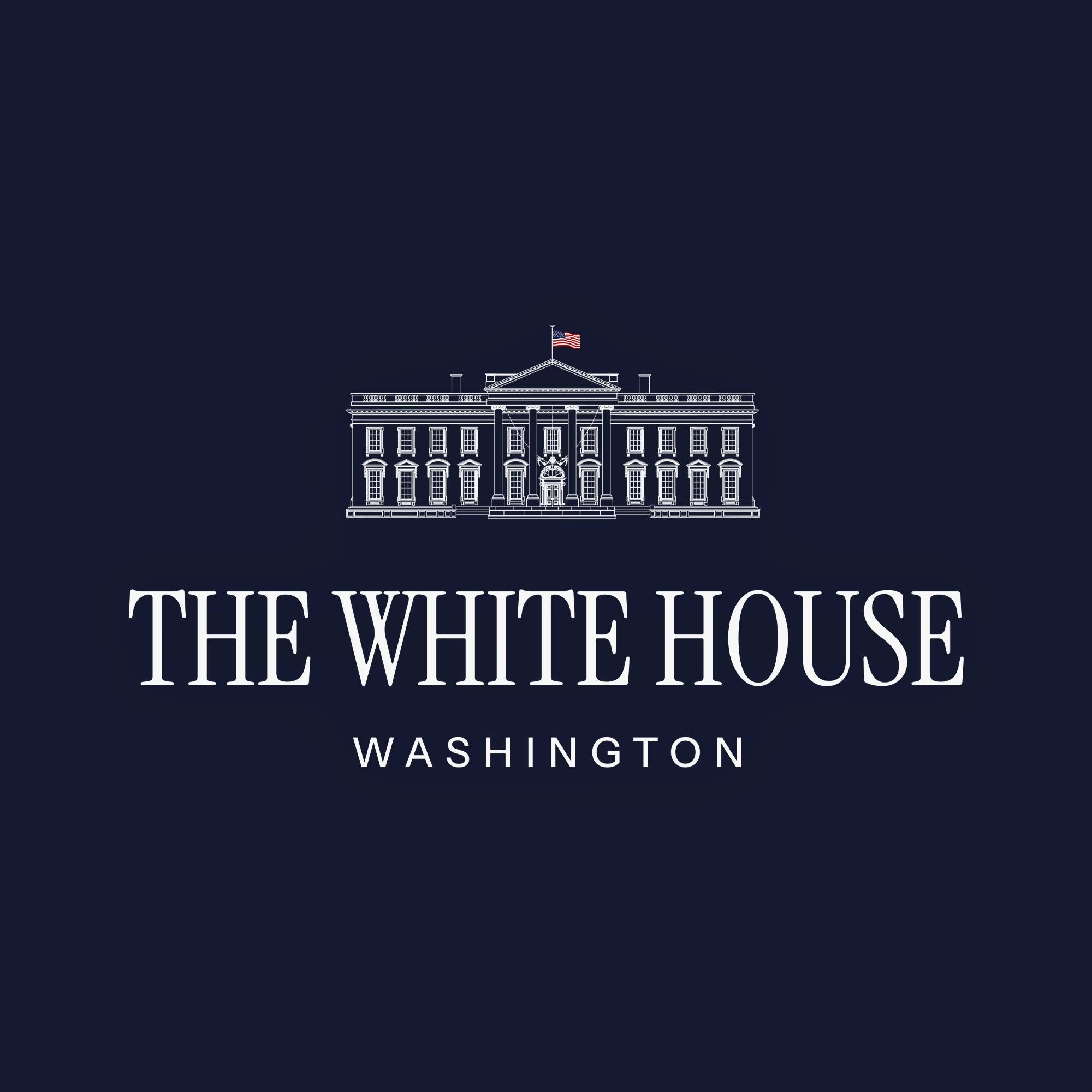
- Incumbent; Robert B. Downing since December 1, 2021
- Executive Residence
- Appointer: President of the United States
- Formation: 1887; 139 years ago
- First holder: Edson S. Densmore

The White House chief usher is the head of household staff and operations at the White House, the official residence and principal workplace of the president of the United States. The position is currently held by Robert B. Downing.

== About the chief usher ==
=== History ===
Although the White House has had staff since it opened, the head of household operations for most of the 1800s was the first lady of the United States. The informally recognized chief servant was often called the steward or stewardess, sometimes the doorkeeper, and beginning with President James Buchanan, the usher. In 1891, the position of chief usher was established in the administration of President Benjamin Harrison. The term "chief usher" was used by the press as early as August 1887.

In 1897, it was created as an official title. William Dubois was the first to use the official title, in the last four of his five years in the role. Thomas E. Stone was the first individual to have the official title of chief usher bestowed on him throughout his tenure.

The average length of service for a chief usher is 10 years. The longest serving White House chief usher is Irwin H. "Ike" Hoover, who served as chief usher for 24 of his 42 years in the White House. The second-longest serving chief usher is Gary J. Walters, who spent 21 years in the position.

=== Administrative position ===
Administratively, the Office of the Chief Usher resides within an agency known as the Executive Residence, which was made part of the Executive Office of the President (EOP) in 2002. Within the Executive Residence are three offices: The Office of the Chief Usher, the Office of the White House Curator, and the Office of Calligraphy.

The Office of the Chief Usher is one of 60 offices within EOP, an executive branch agency which provides operational (rather than policy) support to the president and first family. The actual room used as an office by the Chief Usher is on the State Floor of the White House, opening off the Entrance Hall near the entrance from the North Portico.

The chief usher serves at the pleasure of the president, and has no job tenure or civil service protections. The chief usher has a personal staff of seven, but oversees a total Executive Residence staff of about 90.

=== Duties ===
The chief usher is charged with "the effective operation of the White House Complex and Executive Residence... [The chief usher] develops and administers the budget for the operation, maintenance, and utilities and supervises the Executive Residence staff." The chief usher is responsible for creating the budget for the office of the Executive Residence, overseeing disbursements from the budget, the purchase of supplies, ensuring the physical safety and integrity of the White House's decorative arts and furnishings collections (including theft prevention), and the generation of hand-written (but not printed) White House items such as menus, placards, or invitations.

The chief usher oversees the first family's private as well as public life, meeting the private needs of the family and working to ensure that public and private events do not conflict. Generally, the chief usher hosts a meeting with all White House offices early on every Monday morning to review the week's events and ensure that there are no problems.

The chief usher's budgetary duties are extensive. The chief usher oversaw an Executive Residence budget of $16.4 million in 2001. Overtime is extensive: In 2001, 19 work-years of overtime were budgeted. The chief usher also works closely with the Office of the Social Secretary to ensure that expenditures are charged to the correct government agency. For example, costs for a state dinner must be charged to the United States Department of State, rather than the Executive Residence. The first family may host an event at the White House, but the event might actually be paid for by an external sponsor.

Political events at the White House must be paid for by the sponsoring political party. The rules governing charges are extensive and onerous. In 1988, after Congress learned that many government agencies and external sponsors had unpaid bills at the White House, some going back more than a decade, Congress enacted legislation that requires sponsoring agencies or organizations to pay for charges in advance. Severe financial penalties are imposed if the sponsor fails to pay overages in a timely fashion.

The chief usher coordinates very closely with the Executive Office of the President, the General Services Administration, the National Park Service, the Secret Service, the White House Military Office and other government agencies as needed. Much of the chief usher's daily coordination is with the White House Office of Scheduling and Advance, which supervises and manages the president and first family's schedules. The chief usher meets every morning with the Scheduling and Advance Office to review plans for the day's events.

The chief usher's office is linked to the Scheduling and Advance Office via an inside-the-house-only computer system, which provides a minute-by-minute schedule for the president and first family. The system is updated on the fly, and generates an alert as delays or advances occur. A device in the physical Office of the Chief Usher reports the location of each member of the first family at all times, so that the chief usher and office staff can stay aware of when the president or family members will be arriving at the White House or what they are doing within the executive mansion.

The White House Calligraphy Office—which provides hand-drawn menus, notes, invitations, cards, and similar items—is part of the chief usher's office. However, the Calligraphy Office works most closely not with others in the chief usher's office, but with the Office of the Social Secretary, which oversees all entertaining sponsored by the first family.

For operations involving official ceremonies, such as the state arrival ceremony or state dinner at the White House, the chief usher coordinates activities with the White House social secretary in the East Wing, and the chief of protocol of the United States, an official within the United States Department of State. Early in the Bill Clinton administration, the Office of the Social Secretary was given an ad hoc oversight role over the chief usher. Whereas in the past the Office of the Social Secretary oversaw only entertainment events at the White House, now it was responsible for all events held on White House grounds. The goal of the oversight was to enhance accountability, so that a single "desk" (individual) within the Office of the Social Secretary was responsible for ensuring an event happened flawlessly. With this reorganization, the Office of the Social Secretary now forms an ad hoc committee for each event, with a representative from the Office of the Chief Usher participating in this group.

The chief usher is an ex officio member of the Committee for the Preservation of the White House, which coordinates the decoration, maintenance, refurbishment, and historic preservation of the White House. Other members of the committee include the White House Office of the Curator, Secretary of the Smithsonian Institution, chairman of the United States Commission of Fine Arts, and director of the National Gallery of Art, with whom the chief usher works closely.

Once a month, the chief usher hosts a meeting with the National Park Service (which owns the main White House building and its grounds), the General Services Administration (which owns the East Wing, West Wing, and ancillary buildings scattered in the South Lawn; the Eisenhower Executive Office Building; the New Executive Office Building; the Blair House; and other government-owned townhouses and structures on Jackson Place NW), the Secret Service, and the White House Military Office to review maintenance, repair, security, and other needs at the White House and plan for upkeep.

The chief usher also works closely with the White House Historical Association, the government-chartered, private nonprofit organization which assists with the furnishing of and the acquisition of art for the White House. As part of their duties, the chief usher oversees all gifts which become part of the White House collection, e.g., are not personal gifts to the president or first family.

== List of stewards and chief ushers ==
No.	Image	Name (Birth–Death)	Term of office	President(s)
–		John Briesler (1756–1836)	November 1, 1800 – March 4, 1801	John Adams
–		Joseph Rapin (1766–1841)	March 4, 1801 – September, 1801	Thomas Jefferson
–		Étienne Lemaire (d. 1817)	September 1801 – March 4, 1809	Thomas Jefferson
–		Jean-Pierre Sioussat (1781–1864)	March 4, 1809 – March 4, 1817	James Madison
–		Joseph Jeater	March 4, 1817 – March 4, 1825	James Monroe
–		Antoine Michel Giusta (1785–1872)	March 4, 1825 – 1833	John Quincy Adams; Andrew Jackson
–		Joseph Boulanger (1791–1862)	1833 – 1845	Andrew Jackson; Martin Van Buren; William Henry Harrison; John Tyler
–		Henry Bowman	1845 – March 4, 1849	James K. Polk
–		Ignatius Ruppert (1819–1880)	March 4, 1849 – March 4, 1853	Zachary Taylor; Millard Fillmore
–		William Riley Snow (1808–1885)	March 4, 1853 – March 4, 1857	Franklin Pierce
–		Louis Burgdorf (1828–1880)	1857 – 1859	James Buchanan
–		Wm. Richard Goodchild (1830–1878)	1859 – 1861	James Buchanan; Abraham Lincoln
–		Edson S. Densmore (1849–1892)	early (?)1887 – July 1887	Grover Cleveland
–		John McKenna (1841–1898)	August 1, 1887 – February 1889	Grover Cleveland
–		Edson S. Densmore (1849–1892)	February 1889 – November 13, 1892	Grover Cleveland; Benjamin Harrison
–		Carlos E. Dexter (1842–1919)	March 20, 1893 – December 3, 1895	Grover Cleveland
–		William DuBois (1831–1910)	June 3, 1896 – 1897	Grover Cleveland
Position of Chief Usher formally established in 1897
1		William DuBois (1831–1910)	1897 – January 2, 1902	Grover Cleveland; William McKinley
2		Thomas E. Stone (1869–1959)	January 2, 1902 – March 5, 1909	Theodore Roosevelt
3		Irwin "Ike" H. Hoover (1871–1933)	1904 – September 14, 1933	William Howard Taft; Woodrow Wilson; Warren G. Harding; Calvin Coolidge; Herbert Hoover; Franklin D. Roosevelt
4		Raymond Muir (1897–1954)	September 18, 1933 – April 4, 1938	Franklin D. Roosevelt
5		Howell G. Crim (1898–1959)	April 4, 1938 – June 1957	Franklin D. Roosevelt; Harry S. Truman; Dwight D. Eisenhower
6		J. B. West (1912–1983)	June 2, 1957 – March 1, 1969	Dwight D. Eisenhower; John F. Kennedy; Lyndon B. Johnson; Richard Nixon
7		Rex Scouten (1924–2013)	March 1969 – January 1986	Richard Nixon; Gerald Ford; Jimmy Carter; Ronald Reagan
8		Gary J. Walters	March(?) 1986 – January 31, 2007	Ronald Reagan; George H. W. Bush; Bill Clinton; George W. Bush
9		Stephen W. Rochon	March 12, 2007 – May 2011	George W. Bush; Barack Obama
10		Angella Reid	October 4, 2011 – May 5, 2017	Barack Obama; Donald Trump
11		Timothy Harleth	June 23, 2017 – January 20, 2021	Donald Trump
12		Robert B. Downing	December 1, 2021 – Present	Joe Biden; Donald Trump

== Bibliography ==
- Anthony, Carl Sferrazza (1990). First Ladies: The Saga of the Presidents' Wives and Their Power, 1789–1961. New York: Quill/William Morrow. ISBN 0688112722.
- Brinkley, Howard (2013). White House Butlers: A History of White House Chief Ushers and Butlers. Hustonville, Ky.: Golgotha Press. ISBN 9781621076315.
- Carter, Rosalynn (1984). First Lady From Plains. Boston: Houghton Mifflin. ISBN 0395352940.
- Clinton, Hillary Rodham (2000). An Invitation to the White House: At Home With History. New York: Simon and Schuster. ISBN 0684857995.
- French, Mary (2010). United States Protocol: The Guide to Official Diplomatic Etiquette. Lanham, Md.: Rowman & Littlefield. ISBN 9781442203198.
- Landau, Barry H. (2007). The President's Table: Two Hundred Years of Dining and Diplomacy. New York: Collins. ISBN 9780060899103.
- Michaels, Judith E. (1997). The President's Call: Executive Leadership from FDR to George Bush. Pittsburgh: University of Pittsburgh Press. ISBN 9780822974932.
- Patterson, Bradley H. Jr. (2000). The White House Staff: Inside the West Wing and Beyond. Washington, D.C.: Brookings Institution Press. ISBN 0815769504.
- Patterson, Bradley H. Jr. (2006). "The Bush White House Staff in the Second Term: New Structures? New Faces? New Processes?". In Maranto, Robert; Brattebo, Doug; Lansford, Tom (eds.). The Second Term of George W. Bush: Prospects and Perils. New York: Palgrave Macmillan. ISBN 9781403984418.
- Patterson, Bradley H. Jr. (2010). "White House, The". In Genovese, Michael A. (ed.). Encyclopedia of the American Presidency. New York: Facts on File. ISBN 9780816073665.
- Patterson, Bradley H. Jr. (2012). "The Bush White House: Comparisons With Previous White Houses". In Hilliard, Bryan; Lansford, Tom; Watson, Robert P. (eds.). George W. Bush: Evaluating the President at Midterm. Albany, N.Y.: SUNY Press. ISBN 9780791484845.
- White House Historical Association (2011). White House Words: A Style Guide for Writers and Editors (PDF). Washington, D.C.: White House Historical Association. ISBN 9781931917124. Archived from the original (PDF) on 23 March 2015.
