= White House Chief Calligrapher =

Official position

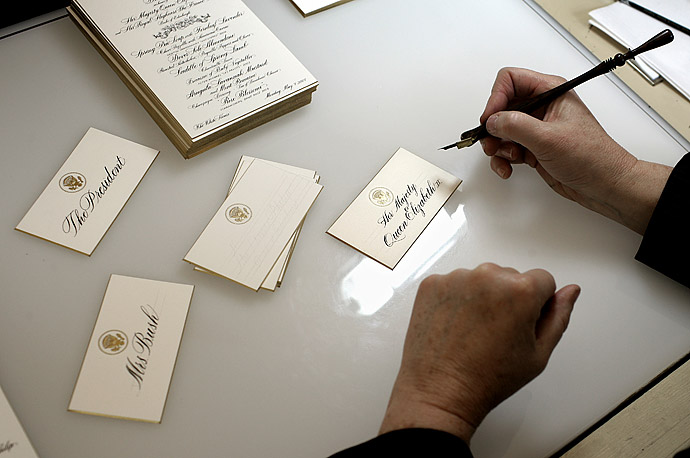
Place cards being calligraphed before a state dinner.

The White House chief calligrapher is responsible for the design and execution of all social and official documents at the White House, the official residence and principal workplace of the president of the United States.

The chief calligrapher worked in the East Wing of the White House in the Graphics and Calligraphy Office with two deputy calligraphers. Projects of the chief calligrapher range from official invitations to state dinners, official greetings from the president, proclamations, military commissions, service awards, and place cards.

The current White House chief calligrapher is Lee Ann Clark. Her salary was $109,200.00 in 2020.

== List of chief calligraphers ==
- Rick Paulus (1998–2006)
- Pat Blair (2006–2018)
- Lee Ann Clark (2019–present)
