= White House china =

Patterns of china for serving and eating food in the White House

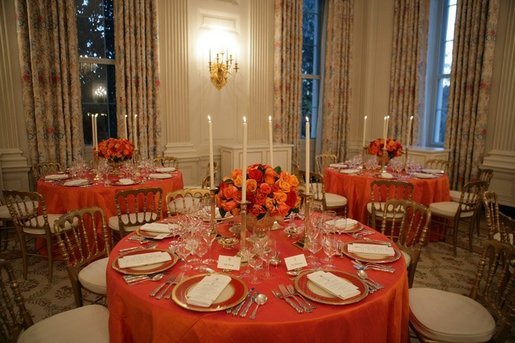
A White House table set in 2005 with the Reagan china from the 1980s

The White House china refers to the various patterns of china (porcelain) used for serving and eating food in the White House, home of the president of the United States. Different china services have been ordered and used by different presidential administrations. The White House collection of china is housed in the White House China Room. Not every administration created its own service, but portions of all china services created for the White House are now in the China Room collection. Some of the older china services are used for small private dinners in the President's Dining Room on the Second Floor.

== White House china services ==
=== Monroe service ===
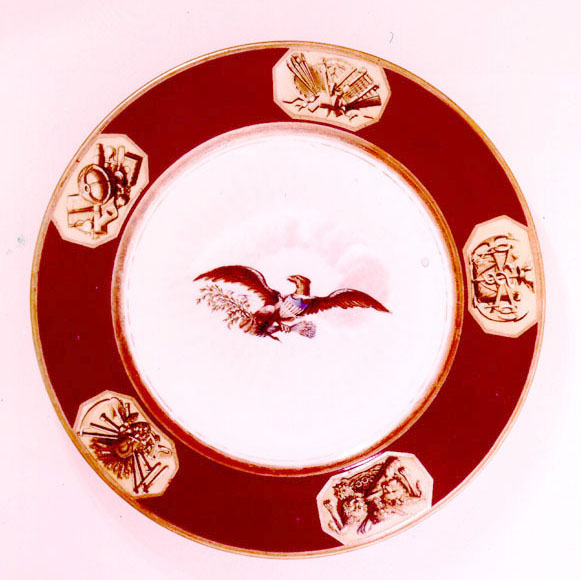
The Monroe china was the first created specifically for an American president.

In 1817 in Paris, Dagoty-Honoré manufactured the china of James Monroe, the first White House china solely for presidential use, and designed specifically for an American president. A dinner service of thirty place-settings and a matching dessert service was purchased for US$1,167.23. A Napoleonic eagle was in the center of the plates, which was popular at the time in both France and America. The eagle carried a red, white, and blue banner reading "E Pluribus Unum", the national motto. Five vignettes inside the dark red border represent agriculture, strength, commerce, science, and arts. The press criticized the china at the time for being foreign goods. Though Congress soon passed a law mandating all furniture for the White House be made in America, when it came to manufacturing china, it would take the country nearly another one hundred years to compete with the fine works produced in England and France.

=== Polk service ===
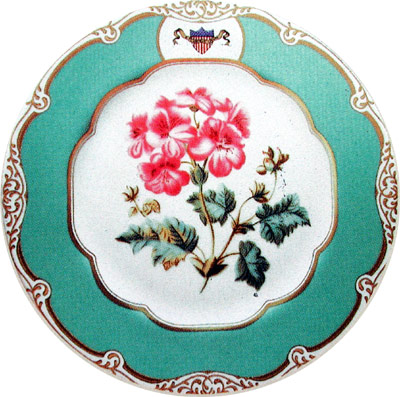
A piece from the Polk dessert service

The White House needed a new china service when the Polks took up residence in 1845. The same company which produced the Monroe china service, Dagoty-Honoré of Paris, made their state dinner service. The dinner and dessert services were ordered in 1846; 400 pieces cost US$979.40. The service included a plain white design and gold trim, making it popular with later administrations. The simplicity of the china made it well-suited to mix with other depleted services when the occasion arose. The dessert service, rather than being plain, features a soft green border and polychrome flowers.

=== Lincoln service ===
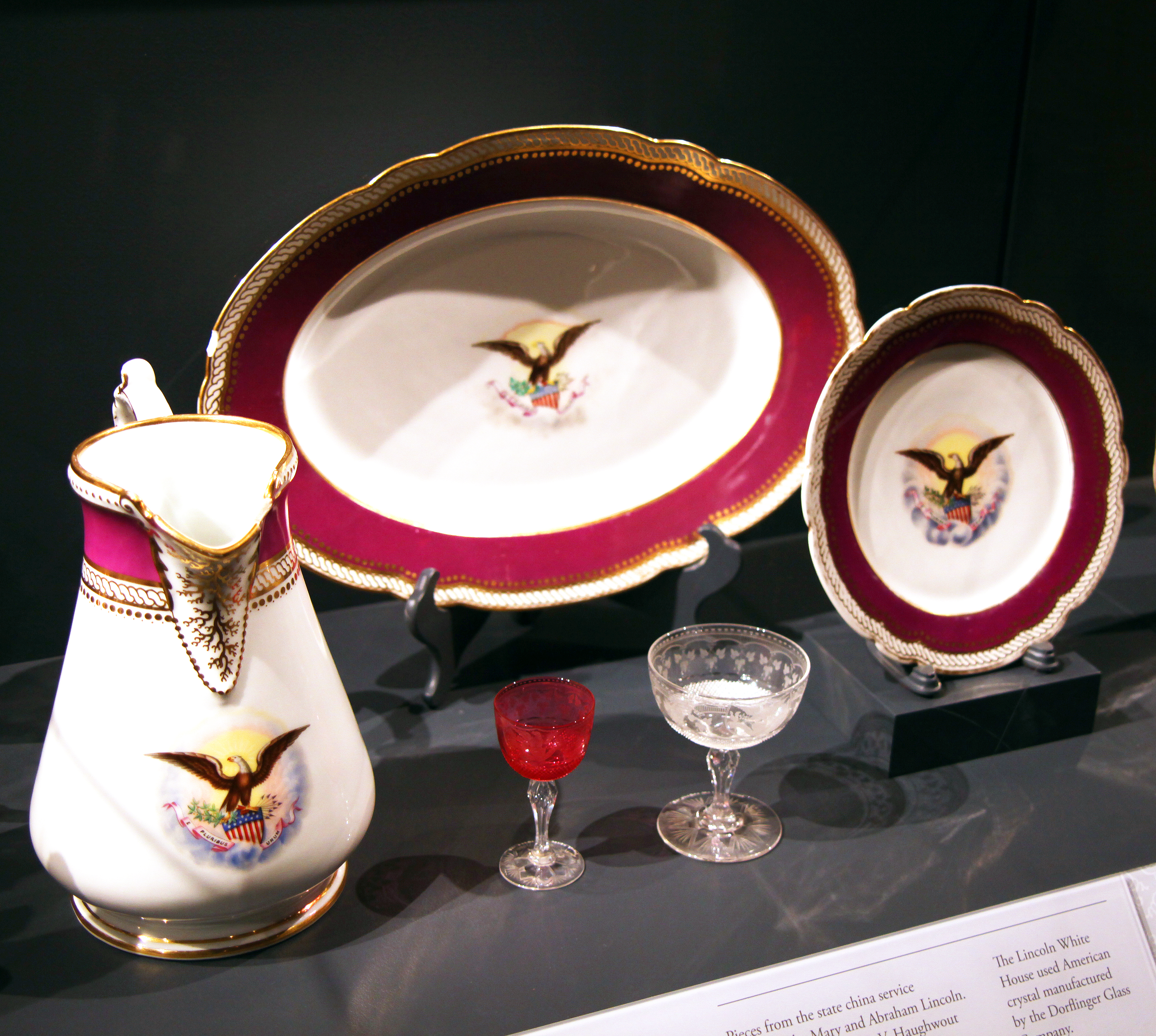
The Lincoln china was used frequently.

The Lincoln china is the first service chosen entirely by a First Lady. Mary Todd Lincoln felt that it was important to maintain a proper appearance in the White House so that foreigners would perceive America as strong and her husband's administration as in control. As a result, the Lincoln administration (1861–1865) was socially active amid the Civil War. Mrs. Lincoln personally selected china with a purple-red border called "Solferino", later known as the "Royal Purple" set, in 1861 from E. V. Haughwout and Company in New York City. Haviland and Company had produced the service in Limoges, France. The American bald eagle is above a shield with the national motto spread throughout clouds. The Coat of Arms of the United States is centered in the service.

=== Hayes service ===
The order of the Hayes china service came about by chance. First Lady Lucy Hayes met with artist Theodore R. Davis. While in the White House conservatory with Mrs. Hayes, Davis suggested that the china include the flora and fauna of North America as decoration. Davis produced 130 designs for Mrs. Hayes, many unique. The order cost $3,120. It was first used during a dinner for incoming President James A. Garfield and his family. The service design was well-liked by the public and reproduced, though critics were less than satisfied.

=== Harrison service ===
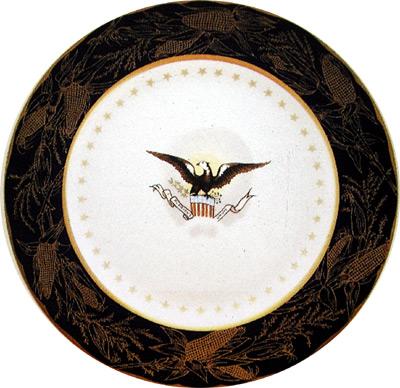
The Harrison china was designed by First Lady Caroline Harrison.

First Lady Caroline Harrison wanted new china that would be "symbolic and meaningful to Americans." An artist herself, the first lady placed the Coat of Arms of the United States in the center of the plates, and designed a goldenrod and corn motif etched in gold around a wide band of blue. The corn represents Mrs. Harrison's home state of Indiana. 44 stars, one for each state in the Union at the time, made up the inner border. Mrs. Harrison directed a large-scale remodeling effort of the White House, and added a china closet to display all past presidential china services. Caroline Harrison never used the china she had ordered, as she died before it was delivered to the White House. The china arrived in December 1892.

=== Theodore Roosevelt service ===
An extensive White House renovation was conducted in the early 1900s, during which the State Dining Room was enlarged to seat over 100 guests. A new set of china was needed due to the expanded size of the room. First Lady Edith Roosevelt ordered 1,320 pieces of Wedgwood china. The china was white and highlighted the Great Seal of the United States. Mrs. Roosevelt expanded upon Mrs. Harrison's efforts to gather china from previous administrations and displayed them in a specially made cabinet on the White House ground floor.

=== Wilson service ===
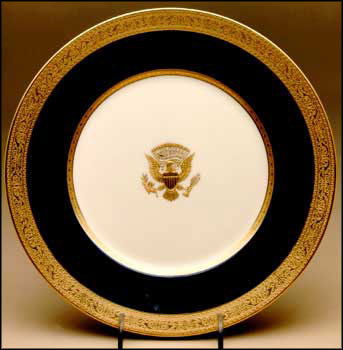
The Wilson service was the first to be manufactured in the United States.

The Wilsons entered the White House in 1913, and at the time, the most recently ordered china was from the Theodore Roosevelt presidency, over ten years before. By 1918, new china was needed. First Lady Edith Wilson preferred ordering American-made china, and chose Lenox after viewing a sample in a Washington, D.C., store. The Wilson pattern was designed by Lenox's chief designer, Frank Holmes, who chose a restrained theme. The china featured a deep ivory border surrounding a brighter ivory body and two bands of matte gold encrusted with stars, stripes, and other motifs. The dinner plates have deep blue borders. Each of the 1,700 pieces has the presidential seal in raised gold. It was the first presidential china to feature the arms of the presidential seal rather than the arms of the Great Seal of the United States. The first shipment of the china was delivered to the White House between August and November 1918. A New York newspaper wrote, "The proud day has arrived when the White House dining service [was] designed by an American artist, made at an American pottery ... and decorated by American workmen." The china remained in use for the Warren Harding, Calvin Coolidge, and Herbert Hoover administrations.

=== Franklin Roosevelt service ===
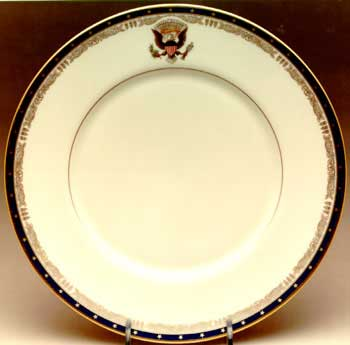
The Franklin Roosevelt china

By 1933, the Wilson service had become largely depleted. First Lady Eleanor Roosevelt promoted new china during difficult economic times to keep American workers employed. The Roosevelts ordered Lenox china through a New York store in October 1934. The pattern included a border of 48 gold stars – one for every state – and the presidential seal in enamel colors on an ivory body. The stars were set against a band of marine blue, personal to the Roosevelts because of the president's interest in nautical subjects, and complemented by an inner band of golden roses and feathers. This was reminiscent of the Roosevelt family crest. Lenox worked overtime so that the 1,722 pieces of china would be completed in time for an important state dinner in January 1935. For the first time in White House history, every guest dined from a single service.

=== Truman service ===
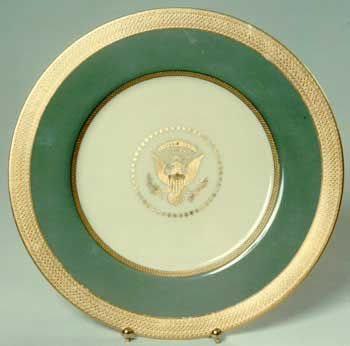
The Truman china

As a result of the 1948–1952 White House renovation, the State Dining Room color was changed, and the Trumans wanted a new china service to match the color of the soft celadon green walls. The Trumans ordered 1,572 pieces of Lenox china in 1951. The pattern included a border of celadon green flanked by an etched gold band and a twenty-four-karat gold rim on an ivory body. It included a raised gold presidential seal, surrounded by 48 gold stars. Following the end of World War II, Harry Truman issued an executive order in 1945 to standardize the seal; he had the head of the eagle turned toward the olive branch, representing peace, instead of toward the arrows, representing war. The china adhered to Truman's order. The service was first used on April 3, 1952, at a luncheon for the Dutch royal family.

=== Eisenhower service ===
By the Eisenhower years, the Truman china was still in good supply. First Lady Mamie Eisenhower ordered 120 service plates to complement the Truman service dinner plates. The plates were ordered from Castleton China, Inc. of New Castle, Pennsylvania, at a cost of $3,606.40. The plates were white, though the rims were covered with pure gold medallions, requiring eight separate kiln firings.

=== Johnson service ===
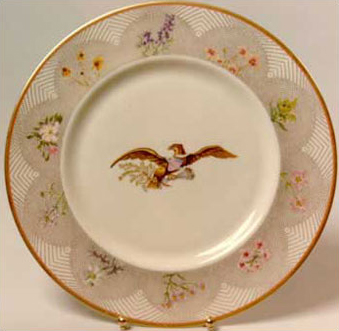
The Lyndon Johnson state china service features American wildflowers.

By 1966, three years into the Johnson presidency, it was determined that new china was needed to replace older services. On November 8, 1967, the new china order was announced; the service would serve 140 guests at a cost of $80,028.24. The Johnson service was the first not purchased with appropriated government funds; an anonymous donor through the White House Historical Association funded the china project. First Lady Lady Bird Johnson worked very closely with the designer, Tiffany and Company of New York City, and Castleton China, Inc manufactured the china. Mrs. Johnson integrated her main cause as first lady — beautification — with the china design. The china pieces feature the eagle first designed for the Monroe china, and the border of the plates were decorated with over forty different wildflowers found throughout the United States portrayed on different plates. The dessert plates feature the state flower of each of the fifty U.S. states. The flowers were hand painted on each plate, delaying the completion of the china until the summer of 1972, four years into the Nixon administration.

=== Reagan service ===
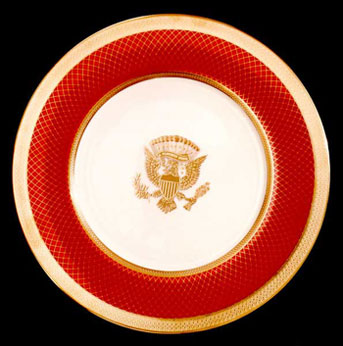
The Reagan state china service

The Reagan state china service was modeled on Woodrow Wilson's china and features the seal of the president of the United States in burnished gold on an ivory background with a border of scarlet. The china was manufactured in the United States by Lenox, and selected by First Lady Nancy Reagan.

State dinners had become so large by the Reagan presidency that none of the china could accommodate the number of guests. First Lady Nancy Reagan ordered 4,370 pieces of Lenox china, enough place settings of 19 pieces for 220 people. This was nearly twice as many placesettings as other recent services. The Reagans wanted a design that would display a strong presence for the subtly colored State Dining Room, now painted white. Nancy Reagan worked closely with Lenox designers to create a pattern with bands in a striking scarlet red, which was her favorite color. The pattern was bordered on each side with etched gold, which created a sparkling contrast with the soft ivory china. The presidential seal was in raised gold in the center, partially overlaying the red border. Fine gold crosshatching overlays the red on pieces such as the service and dessert plates.

The Reagans were often criticized for the $209,508 cost. The china was not funded by taxpayers and was paid for by a J.P. Knapp Foundation donation.

=== Clinton service ===
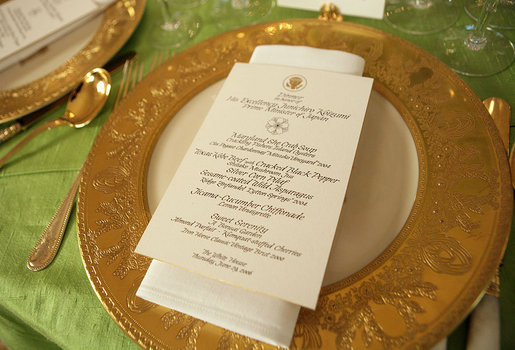
The Clinton china service being used for a state dinner. (Official visit of Junichiro Koizumi, June 2006)

To commemorate the bicentennial of the White House, the Clintons ordered 300 12-piece place settings in 2000. Unlike previous White House china services, the Clinton china included a border of pale, creamy yellow, rather than a brighter primary color, and images of the White House, instead of the customary presidential seal, in the center. Each piece in each place setting included a different pattern showing outstanding architectural elements found in the East Room, State Dining Room, and Diplomatic Reception Room. It was first used at a dinner function attended by Gerald Ford and Mrs. Ford, Jimmy Carter and Mrs. Carter, George H. W. Bush and Mrs. Bush, and Lady Bird Johnson.

=== Bush service ===
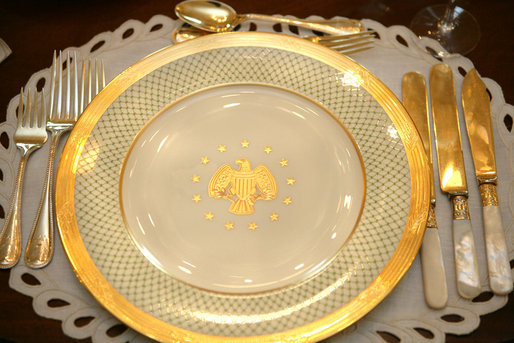
George W. Bush White House state china

The George W. Bush White House state china has a gold rim with a green basket-weave pattern and a historically-inspired gold eagle. Lenox manufactured it.

The Bush china was introduced on January 7, 2009, two weeks before President George W. Bush left office. Two service sets were introduced. The larger service set was the first full set since that of the Reagan china in 1982. The larger set, made by Lenox, is composed of roughly 4500 pieces to fill 320 14-piece place settings. First Lady Laura Bush chose a soft green pattern due to its versatility and ability to coordinate with flowers. The pattern was inspired by a coffee service belonging to President James and Dolley Madison.

The smaller White House Magnolia Pattern service set, made by Pickard China in Illinois and designed by Anna Weatherley, is composed of 75 place settings and was purchased for use in the private quarters of the White House.

=== Obama service ===
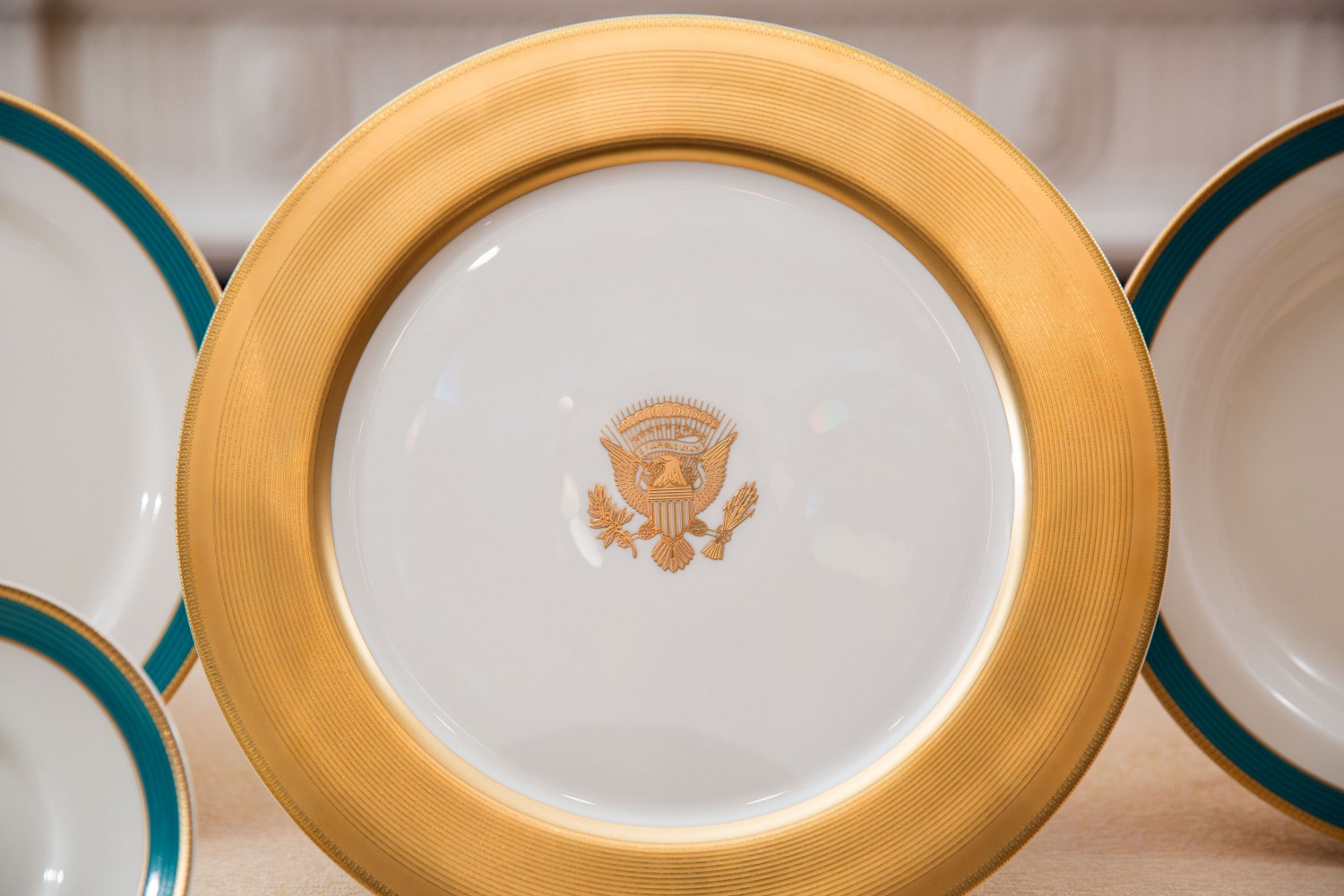
Obama state china service

The 3,520-piece Obama state china service was introduced on April 27, 2015, the day before it was to be used for the first time at the April 28 state dinner for Japanese Prime Minister Shinzo Abe. The rim of most pieces is decorated with textured gold. Inside the rim is a band in "Kailua Blue", a bright blue color inspired by the hue of the sea in President Barack Obama's birth state of Hawaii. A delicate inner line of gold completes the decoration. Dinner and serving plates are simpler in design. Each dinner plate has a simple, narrow band of gold on the edge and a broad, undecorated bas-relief pinwheels and fronds on the rim. The bas-relief design was taken from an Empire style china service purchased by then-Secretary of State James Madison in 1806. The bas-relief element, Andrew Pickard Morgan of Pickard China says, is unique to White House china. The service plates feature a broad, textured rim of gold, and the presidential coat of arms in gold in the center.

The service contains 320 settings, and each setting has 11 pieces. Each setting also contains (for the first time in the history of White House china services) an individual tureen. The tureen can be used for soups, small entrees, or desserts, and reflects a more modern dining style. Pickard workers spent more than a year, experimenting with numerous trial pieces, to produce the tureen.

In addition to the service plate, the teacup, and the dessert plate all feature the presidential coat of arms.

First Lady Michelle Obama was assisted in composing the china service pattern by designer Michael S. Smith. Planning began in the fall of 2011, and White House chefs, White House staff, and Pickard China of Illinois were consulted on the design. The set was manufactured by Pickard China at a cost of about $367,258. The White House Historical Association, a private foundation established by First Lady Jacqueline Kennedy to purchase furniture and decorative and fine arts for the Executive Residence, provided the funds for the purchase.

=== Trump service ===
Melania Trump worked on a china design, but the project was sidelined due to cost and time constraints.

== See also ==
- List of U.S. State Dinners

== General references ==
- Abbott James A., and Elaine M. Rice. Designing Camelot: The Kennedy White House Restoration. Van Nostrand Reinhold: 1998. ISBN 0-442-02532-7.
- Garrett, Wendell. Our Changing White House. Northeastern University Press: 1995. ISBN 1-55553-222-5.
- Klapthor, Margaret Bown. White House China: 1789 to the Present. The Barra Foundation and Harry N. Abrams: 1999. ISBN 0-8109-3993-2.
- Leish, Kenneth. The White House. Newsweek Book Division: 1972. ISBN 0-88225-020-5.
- McKellar, Kenneth, Douglas W. Orr, Edward Martin, et al. Report of the Commission on the Renovation of the Executive Mansion. Commission on the Renovation of the Executive Mansion, Government Printing Office: 1952.
- Monkman, Betty C. The White House: The Historic Furnishing & First Families. Abbeville Press: 2000. ISBN 0-7892-0624-2.
- Seale, William. The President's House. White House Historical Association and the National Geographic Society: 1986. ISBN 0-912308-28-1.
- Seale, William, The White House: The History of an American Idea. White House Historical Association: 1992, 2001. ISBN 0-912308-85-0.
- The White House: An Historic Guide. White House Historical Association and the National Geographic Society: 2001. ISBN 0-912308-79-6.
- The White House. The First Two Hundred Years, ed. by Frank Freidel/William Pencak, Boston 1994.
