= John McKenna (usher) =

Irish American civil servant

White House Chief Usher
- In office 1887–1889
- President: Grover Cleveland
- Preceded by: Edson S. Densmore
- Succeeded by: Edson S. Densmore

Personal details
- Born: 1841 Carrick-on-Suir, County Tipperary, Ireland
- Died: December 16, 1898 (aged 56–57) Boston, Massachusetts, U.S.

John Francis McKenna (1841 – December 16, 1898) was an Irish American civil servant who served as Chief Usher of the White House in Washington, D.C., from 1887 to 1889.

== Life and career ==
McKenna was born in the town of Carrick-on-Suir in County Tipperary in southern Ireland in 1841. He was the seventh of nine children born to Neal McKenna and his wife, and the second of three sons. He emigrated to the United States with his family in 1849, arriving in Boston, Massachusetts, on August 1. The McKennas settled in Troy, New York, where John grew up. McKenna was a strong Irish nationalist, and in the 1860s he was one of the most prominent Irish Nationalists in the United States. He married Bridget McIntyre, and they had five children: James (1863), John Jr. (1866), Alice (1871), Mary (1875), and Charles (1877). James later became a noted physician. Little else is known about his family, upbringing, education, or early life.

McKenna became a businessman in Troy, although the nature of his business is not clear. On November 23, 1870, McKenna was appointed Superintendent of Police of the city of Troy. He held this office for the next 12 years, until December 1, 1882. The outgoing mayor of Troy reappointed McKenna to yet another term as Superintendent on his last day in office. The new mayor appointed local man John Quigley the following day. McKenna continued to hold the office, however, and Quigley contested McKenna's reappointment. On March 16, 1883, the New York Court of Appeals—the highest court in the state of New York—ruled that McKenna's reappointment was not legal. As superintendent, McKenna likely was appointed to the rank of police colonel (a title he used for the rest of his life). McKenna was also a member of the New York State Militia, where he reached the rank of lieutenant. From January 22, 1874, to at least 1875 McKenna also served as a porter for the Port of New York.

For reasons of ill health, White House Chief Usher Edson S. Densmore resigned from his post in late July 1887. President Grover Cleveland, a former Governor of New York, appointed McKenna the Chief Usher on July 31, 1887. McKenna's tenure did not last long. Cleveland lost re-election in November 1888. Densmore was asked to rejoin the White House in February 1889 in order to oversee preparations for the inauguration of President-elect Benjamin Harrison. President Harrison asked Densmore to stay on as chief usher on his very first day in office. Densmore agreed, and according to the Fitchburg Sentinel he was the first official of the Harrison administration to be sworn in.

McKenna was not unemployed long, for that same year he was appointed an Internal Revenue agent in Boston in 1889. It is unclear how long he held this position.

John McKenna died of stomach cancer at his home in Boston on December 16, 1898, at the age of 57. He was survived by his five children (his wife preceded him in death).
