= Raymond Muir =

American civil servant

Raymond D. Muir
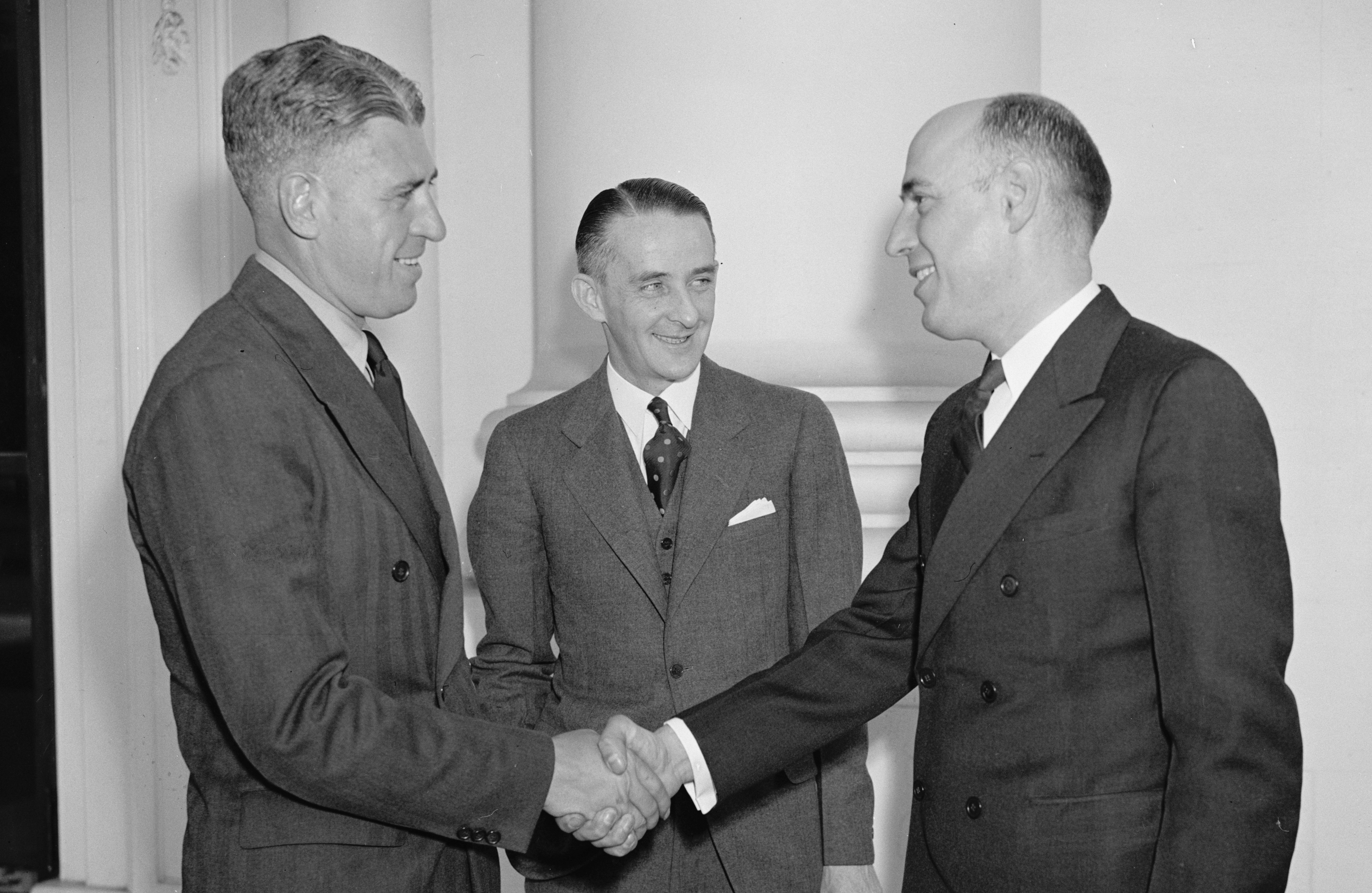
- Muir (left) shakes hands with successor Howell Crim (right). Charles Claunch, a newly appointed usher, looks on.

4th White House Chief Usher
- In office 1933–1938
- President: Franklin D. Roosevelt
- Preceded by: Irwin "Ike" H. Hoover
- Succeeded by: Howell G. Crim

Personal details
- Born: June 5, 1897; Somerville, Massachusetts, U.S.
- Died: June 23, 1954 (aged 57); Washington, D.C., U.S.

Raymond Douglas Muir (June 5, 1897 – June 23, 1954) was an American civil servant who served as Chief Usher in the White House from 1933 to 1938, and Deputy Chief of Protocol for the United States Department of State from 1951 until his death in 1954.

== Early life ==
Raymond Douglas Muir was born on June 5, 1897, in Somerville, Massachusetts. (Note: Muir's tombstone at Arlington National Cemetery lists his date of birth as 1898, but every published source lists it as 1897.) He attended the public schools in Boston, Massachusetts. After graduating from high school, he spent three or four years traveling and working in Nova Scotia, Canada.

When the United States entered World War I, Muir was one of the earliest enlistees. He was just 17 years old. From April 1917 to January 1919, he served in the United States Navy. After the end of hostilities, he joined the Graves Registration Service as a civilian, helping to locate the bodies of U.S. servicemen and either record their burial place or have the remains moved to a U.S. military cemetery. In 1920, Muir left the Navy and joined the United States Army, where he served as a port officer in France until 1922. While in France, Muir met and married a local French girl, Pauline Geugan. They had a single child, Collete Dona Muir, born in 1942.

Muir returned to the United States in 1922, and joined the Veterans' Bureau (the forerunner to the United States Department of Veterans Affairs) as a liaison officer. He joined the United States Army Reserve, where he rose to the rank of captain.

== White House ==
Muir left the Veterans' Bureau in 1930 and joined the staff of the White House as an assistant chief usher under the supervision of Chief Usher Irwin "Ike" H. Hoover. His appointment came about after the White House asked for someone with military experience to work as an assistant to Hoover. Muir enrolled at the Washington College of Law (the law school of American University in Washington, D.C.) in 1930, and graduated with a JD degree in the summer of 1933. On the platform with him was First Lady Eleanor Roosevelt, who received an honorary degree from the law school that year.

Ike Hoover died suddenly at his home in Washington, D.C., of a heart attack on the evening of September 14, 1933. His death was reported on the front page of the next day's The Washington Post. On September 18, President Franklin D. Roosevelt appointed Muir to be Chief Usher of the White House. As Chief Usher, Muir oversaw the operation of the White House and its staff. He had intimate daily contact with the President and First Family, oversaw all White House social affairs (formal and informal), and oversaw the reception and housing of heads of state, heads of government, diplomats, and other guests, important and not, at the White House. Muir left the White House in April 1938 to join the State Department. Howell G. Crim, Muir's longtime assistant chief usher, was named his replacement on April 4, 1938.

== State Department ==
In spring 1938, George T. Summerlin, the Chief of Protocol at the State Department, asked Muir to become his assistant. Muir joined the State Department on April 16, 1938, as an assistant to Richard Southgate, chief of the International Conference Division. In July 1941, Muir was appointed the State Department's representative aboard the USS West Point. The ship carried 464 Nazi German and Italian Fascist diplomatic officials, agents, and their families to Lisbon, Portugal, where they were exchanged for American diplomatic personnel, civilians, and their families. In 1942, he again served as the State Department representative aboard the MS Gripsholm, a Swedish ocean liner chartered by the U.S. government which exchanged more than 1,500 Japanese diplomatic, commercial, and other personnel and their families for 1,300 Americans.

Muir was named Acting Ceremonial Officer in the State Department's Division of Protocol on July 27, 1943, and was promoted permanently into the position on March 20, 1944. On December 1, 1946, Muir was appointed Chief Ceremonial Officer and Assistant Chief of the Division of Protocol.

Muir was promoted to Deputy Chief of Protocol on April 29, 1951. In this position, Muir introduced new ambassadors and their credentials to the President of the United States, and handled any instance where someone with diplomatic immunity ran afoul of U.S. law.

== Death and burial ==
Muir accompanied Paul I, King of Greece, during his trip across the United States in the fall of 1953. While crossing the Rocky Mountains at high altitude, Muir suffered from breathing problems, which were later diagnosed as lung cancer. Muir entered Georgetown University Hospital on November 26, 1953, and underwent surgery to remove the cancer. The surgery was not successful, and in March 1954 Muir returned to Georgetown and had a lung removed.

Muir's health began to fail suddenly in mid-June 1954. He died of lung cancer at Georgetown University Hospital on June 23, 1954.

== Bibliography ==
- Brown, J. Robert Jr. (2002). Opening Japan's Financial Markets. New York: Routledge. ISBN 9781134839766.
- Department of State (1938). Biographic Register. Washington, D.C.: U.S. Government Printing Office.
- Department of State (1950). Biographic Register. Washington, D.C.: U.S. Government Printing Office. hdl:2027/mdp.35112103564300.
- Department of State (April 1, 1953). Supplement to 1951 Biographic Register of the Department of State. Washington, D.C.: U.S. Government Printing Office. hdl:2027/uc1.b3763447.
