= William Dubois (usher) =

American civil servant

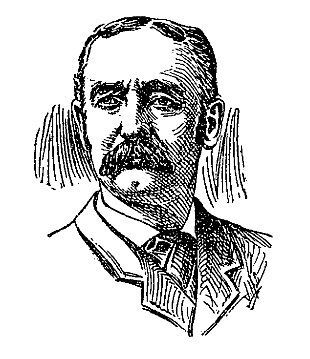
- Dubois about 1897

1st White House Chief Usher
- In office June 1896 – January 1902
- President: Grover Cleveland; William McKinley
- Preceded by: Carlos E. Dexter
- Succeeded by: Thomas E. Stone

Personal details
- Born: 1841
- Died: April 29, 1910 (aged 68–69) Washington, D.C., U.S.

William Dubois (1841 – April 29, 1910) was an American civil servant who served as Chief Usher of the White House in Washington, D.C., from June 1896 to January 1901. He was the first person to formally receive the title Chief Usher, although in previous years it had been used unofficially and in press reports.

== Life and career ==
The exact date of William Dubois' birth is unclear. His headstone lists 1831, but obituaries at the time of his death claimed he was only about 70 years old (which puts the date of his birth about 1840 or 1841). (Note: Since Dubois was still working near the end of his life, the latter date seems more reasonable and is the one used in this article.) Little is known about Dubois' early life, except that he had a brother, Isaac, and a sister, Mary. He served as a foot soldier in the Union Army during the American Civil War under the command of General William Tecumseh Sherman, but which specific unit, division, corps, or army is not known.

After the Civil War, Dubois settled in Washington, D.C., where he joined the Metropolitan Police Department (MPD). He was assigned as a guard at the White House in 1880. In 1881, Dubois was sued in local court for arresting a man without a warrant. The news made local headlines, and Dubois was acquitted.

Dubois was appointed an usher at the White House on April 29, 1881, although he continued to hold his job on the police force. He retired from the MPD in 1892, with the local press reporting that he reached the rank of captain. Dubois was appointed chief usher at the White House on June 3, 1896. He succeeded Carlos E. Dexter, a United States Army officer who had served as chief usher from March 1893 to December 1895. The term "chief usher" had been used by press as early as August 1887, indicating that one of the ushers was considered the "chief" or supervisory usher. The official title, "Chief Usher", was not created until 1897. Dubois was the first to use the title, but it applied only for the last four of his five years in the role. As Chief Usher, Dubois oversaw a staff of 10 and had supervisory control over the police and guards who served inside the White House (but not outside on its grounds). As Chief Usher, Dubois also controlled access to the White House. More than 500 people per day passed through the building on tours and official business, and Dubois personally oversaw the hundreds of items turned into the Executive Mansion's lost-and-found department.

Dubois' health was never good, and it eventually led to his resignation. He first fell ill with malaria for two weeks in November 1892. He fell ill with an unspecified disease in mid-September 1899, and by early November there were fears he would not survive. But Dubois did live, and returned to his duties on December 20, 1899. Dubois' health remained fragile, however, and on January 2, 1902, he asked to be transferred to less onerous duties at another executive branch agency. President Theodore Roosevelt granted his request, and Dubois went to work for the Bureau of Pensions.

== Retirement and death ==
It's unclear how long Dubois worked for the Bureau of Pensions. His wife, Mary Ellen (née Talbert) DuBois, died about December 7 or 8, 1907.

Dubois moved away from Washington, D.C., some time in 1909, but after an absence of eight months returned to live in the city again in 1910. He died at his home of unspecified causes on April 29, 1910. Although he was a member of the city's Metropolitan Presbyterian Church, he was buried in Congressional Cemetery.
