= Ike Hoover =

American cabinet administrator (1871–1933)

Irwin Hood Hoover
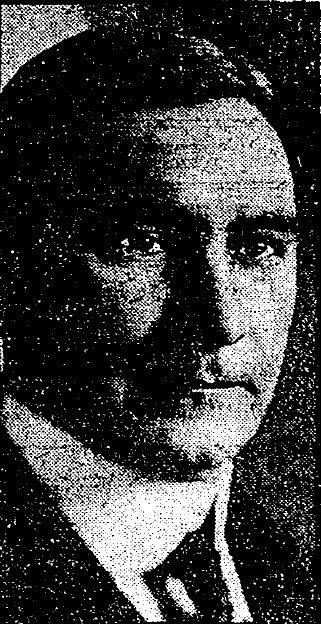
- Ike Hoover in 1922

3rd White House Chief Usher
- In office 1904–1933
- President: Benjamin Harrison; Grover Cleveland; William McKinley; Theodore Roosevelt; William Howard Taft; Woodrow Wilson; Warren G. Harding; Calvin Coolidge; Herbert Hoover; Franklin Delano Roosevelt
- Preceded by: Thomas E. Stone
- Succeeded by: Raymond Muir

Personal details
- Born: October 24, 1871 Washington, D.C., U.S.
- Died: September 14, 1933 (aged 61) Washington, D.C., U.S.

Irwin Hood "Ike" Hoover (October 24, 1871 – September 14, 1933) served as the White House Chief Usher from 1904 to 1933, his death. He served in the White House for 42 years and as Usher for 29 years, and both records remain unbroken as of 2025.

== Career ==
Irwin "Ike" Hoover was born in Washington, D.C., the son of a grocer.

His first job was as a telephone operator, but he later became an electrician. He became an employee of the Edison Electric Company, and was sent to the White House on May 6, 1891, to install the first electric lights and an electric bell system in the executive mansion. At the time, no private building in the city had electricity, and the only government-owned building which did was the Bureau of Engraving and Printing. President Benjamin Harrison and his family considered electricity dangerous, and no one in the Harrison family would even turn a light switch for fear of electrocution. On May 15, when Hoover finished the installation, he was asked by President Harrison to leave Edison Electric and join the White House staff as an electrician. Hoover agreed. For the next several years, Hoover's job was to turn lights on and off throughout the day, and to assist the family in using the bell system (which they were also afraid of). As the Harrisons and other presidential families became less fearful of electricity, Hoover's job was to keep the system working and to install new electrical wiring and appliances as needed.

In 1904, Hoover accepted a position as an usher at the White House. The White House had asked him to act as temporary usher on several previous occasions, so the promotion was not as unusual as it might seem. Hoover was appointed Chief Usher by President Theodore Roosevelt in 1909. (Note: Some sources, such as Levin and Pohl, claim Hoover was appointed Chief Usher immediately in 1891. A large number of sources—including Brinkley; Graham; McClure; Morison, Blum, and Buckley; Ragland; and Truman—claim that his appointment as Chief Usher was made in the William Howard Taft administration (March 4, 1909, to March 4, 1913). These sources are clearly contradicted by the official White House papers and the concurrent press report.) (Hoover and Roosevelt were already well-acquainted with each other, as Roosevelt had served on the United States Civil Service Commission during the Harrison administration and had been Assistant Secretary of the Navy under President William McKinley.)

Hoover served as Chief Usher until his death in 1933. From 1891 until 1909, his daily uniform was a tailcoat (which hung to below the knees), waistcoat, formal trousers, and dress shirt with tie. This changed when President William Howard Taft allowed staff to wear business suits. During these 42 years of service, Hoover had intimate daily contact with ten Presidents (including the unrelated Herbert Hoover) and their families. As Chief Usher, he was the executive head of the household, in charge of all social affairs and entrusted with confidential matters of every description regarding the household and First Family. It was also his duty to welcome guests of the President, to arrange the details of their visits, and to make them feel at home in the White House.

During his tenure at the White House, Hoover oversaw the preparations for the funerals of President McKinley and President Warren G. Harding. He also oversaw the planning for the weddings of Alice Roosevelt, Eleanor Wilson, and Jessie Wilson, presidential daughters who were all married at the White House. When President Woodrow Wilson traveled to France for peace negotiations at the end of World War I, Hoover traveled with him and controlled the staff and household operations in the palaces where Wilson stayed.

== Death ==
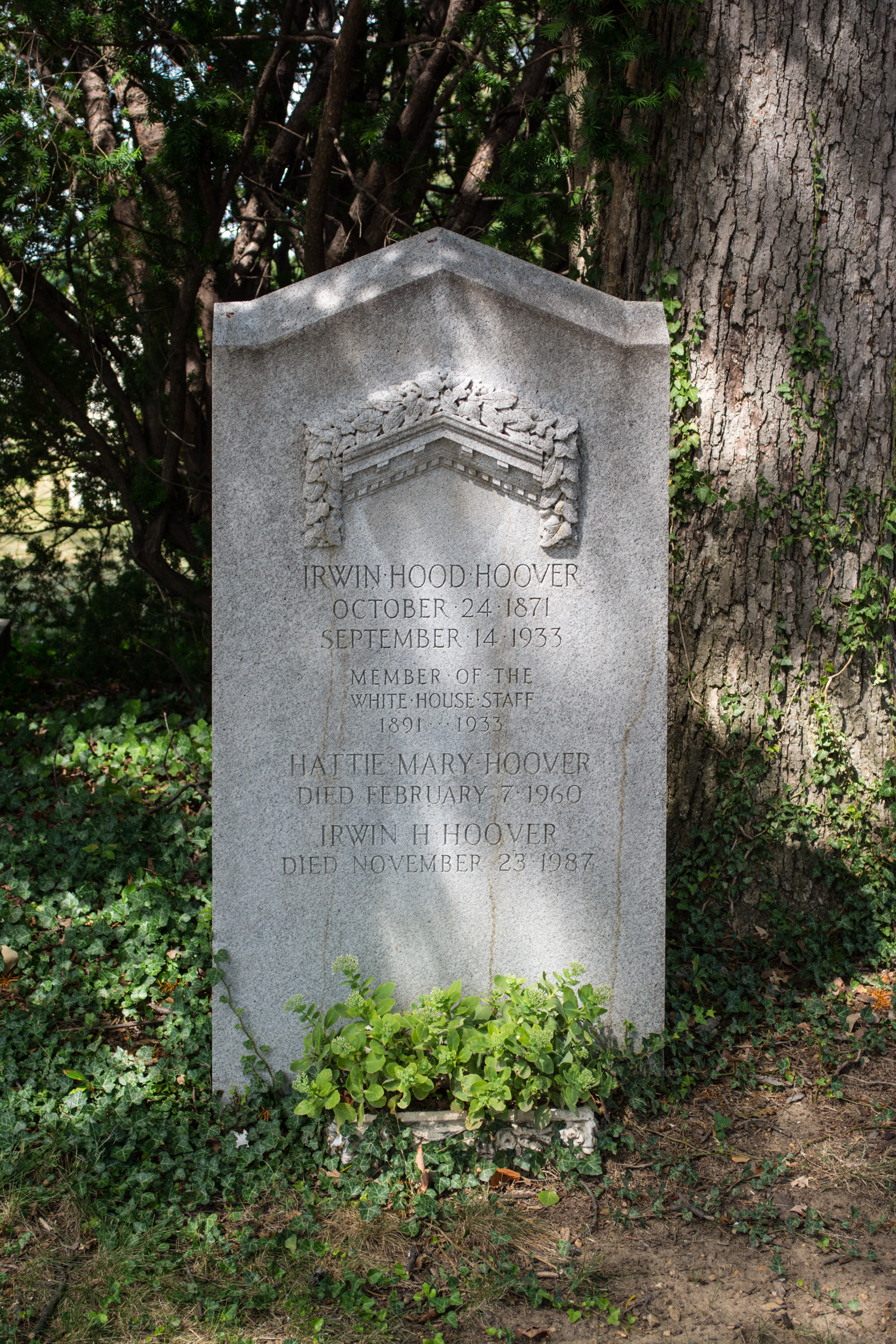
Grave of Ike Hoover at Glenwood Cemetery in Washington, D.C.

Ike Hoover died suddenly at his home in Washington, D.C., of a heart attack on the evening of September 14, 1933. His death was reported on the front page of The Washington Post the next day.

President Franklin D. Roosevelt offered the use of the White House for Hoover's funeral, but the Hoover family declined the offer. Hoover's funeral was held at the Glenwood Cemetery Mortuary Chapel at Glenwood Cemetery in Washington, D.C. Colonel Julien E. Yates, chief of all United States Army chaplains, officiated. President Roosevelt, members of his Cabinet, and Roosevelt's personal secretary Louis Howe served as honorary pallbearers. The entire White House staff attended the funeral.

Hoover was buried at Glenwood Cemetery. He was survived by his wife, Hattie Mary Hoover, and his son and daughter.

== Screen portrayals ==
Roy Roberts portrayed Ike Hoover in Wilson (1944)

Colin Hamilton portrayed Ike Hoover in Eleanor and Franklin: The White House Years (1977)

Leslie Nielsen portrayed Ike Hoover in Backstairs at the White House (1979)

== Sources ==
- Brinkley, Howard (2013). White House Butlers: A History of White House Chief Ushers and Butlers. Hustonville, Ky.: Golgotha Press. ISBN 9781621076315.
- Butturff, Dorothy Dow (1984). McClure, Ruth K. (ed.). Eleanor Roosevelt, An Eager Spirit: Selected Letters of Dorothy Dow, 1933-1945. South Yarmouth, Mass.: J. Curley. ISBN 9780893409173.
- Graham, Katharine (2002). Katharine Graham's Washington. New York: Knopf. ISBN 0375414711.
- Hoover, Herbert (1971). Rice, Arnold S. (ed.). Herbert Hoover, 1874-1964: Chronology-Documents-Bibliographical Aids. Dobbs Ferry, N.Y.: Oceana Publications. ISBN 0379120712.
- Hoover, Irwin Hood (1934). Forty-Two Years in the White House. New York: Houghton Mifflin Company.
- Levin, Phyllis Lee (2002). Edith and Woodrow: The Wilson White House. New York: Simon and Schuster. ISBN 9780743217569.
- Library of Congress (1965). The National Union Catalog of Manuscript Collections. Hamden, Conn.: Shoe String Press.
- Moore, Anne Chieko (2005). Caroline Lavinia Scott Harrison. New York: Nova History Publication. ISBN 1594540993.
- Pohl, Robert S. (2013). Urban Legends and Historic Lore of Washington, D.C. Charleston, S.C.: History Press. ISBN 9781626191969.
- Ragland, James Franklin (1954). Franklin D. Roosevelt and Public Opinion, 1933-1940. Palo Alto, Calif.: Stanford University Press.
- Roosevelt, Theodore (1952). Morison, Elting Elore; Blum, John Morton; Buckley, John J. (eds.). The Letters of Theodore Roosevelt: The Big Stick, 1905-1909. Volumes 5 and 6. Cambridge, Mass.: Harvard University Press.
- Truman, Margaret (2003). The President's House: A First Daughter Shares the History and Secrets of the World's Most Famous Home. New York: Ballantine Books. ISBN 0345444523.
