= Félix Vallotton =

Swiss painter and printmaker (1865–1925)

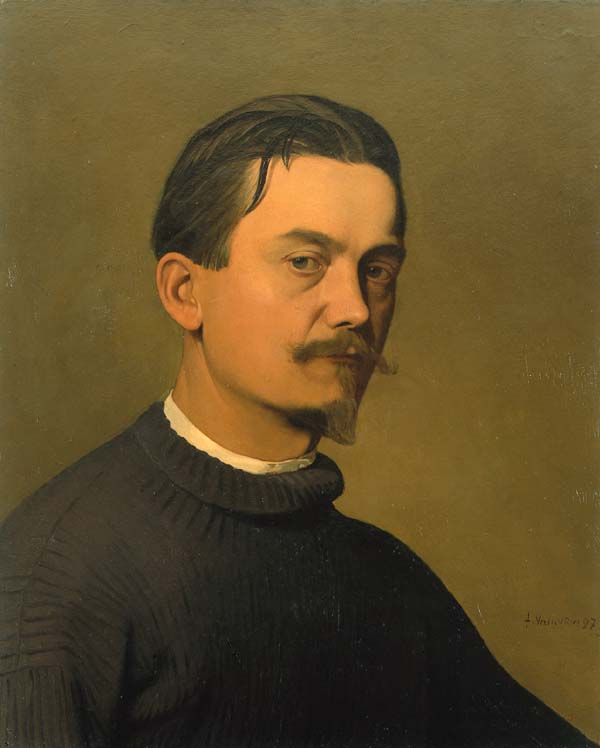
- Self-portrait (1897)
- Born: Félix Édouard Vallotton; December 28, 1865; Lausanne, Switzerland
- Died: December 29, 1925 (aged 60); Neuilly-sur-Seine, Paris
- Education: École des Beaux-Arts, Académie Julian
- Known for: Painting, woodcuts

Félix Édouard Vallotton (French: [feliks edwaʁ valɔtɔ̃]; December 28, 1865 – December 29, 1925) was a Swiss and French painter and printmaker associated with the group of artists known as Les Nabis. He was an important figure in the development of the modern woodcut. He painted portraits, landscapes, nudes, still lifes, and other subjects in an unemotional, realistic style.

His earliest paintings were influenced by Holbein and Ingres. He developed a simpler style during his association with Les Nabis during the 1890s, and produced woodcuts which brought him international recognition. Characterized by broad masses of black and white with minimal detail, they include street scenes, bathers, portraits, and a series of ten interiors titled Intimités (Intimacies) that portray charged domestic encounters between men and women. He produced few prints after 1901, and concentrated instead on painting. His later paintings include highly finished portraits and nudes, and landscapes painted from memory.

He was also active as a writer. He published art criticism during the 1890s, and his novel La Vie meurtrière (The Murderous Life) was published posthumously.

== Early life ==
Vallotton was born into a conservative middle-class family in Lausanne, the third of four children. His father owned a pharmacy, and later purchased a chocolate factory. His mother, Emma, was the daughter of a furniture craftsman. His family environment was warm but strict, in the Swiss Protestant tradition. Beginning in 1875 he attended the Collège Cantonal, graduating with a degree in classical studies in 1882. He also began to attend the drawing classes of the painter Jean-Samson Guignard, normally reserved for the most advanced students, where he showed a particular skill in close observation and realism. When he completed the course, he persuaded his parents to let him go to Paris to study art seriously.

In January 1882 he settled in Rue Jacob in the neighborhood of Saint-Germain-des-Prés, and enrolled in Académie Julian, where he studied with the portrait painter Jules Joseph Lefebvre and the history painter Gustave Boulanger, and where he perfected his technical skills. He spent many hours in the Louvre, and he greatly admired the works of Leonardo da Vinci, Holbein, Dürer, and more modern painters, including Goya and Manet, and especially Ingres, whose works were models for Vallotton throughout his life.

In 1883, Vallotton's father wrote to Lefebvre, questioning whether his son could make a living as a painter. Lefebvre responded that the young Vallotton had the talent and ability to succeed. In the same year, Vallotton succeeded in the rigorous competition to enter the École des Beaux-Arts, but decided instead to remain at the Académie Julian, where his friends were. He also began to frequent the cafés and cabarets of Montmartre.

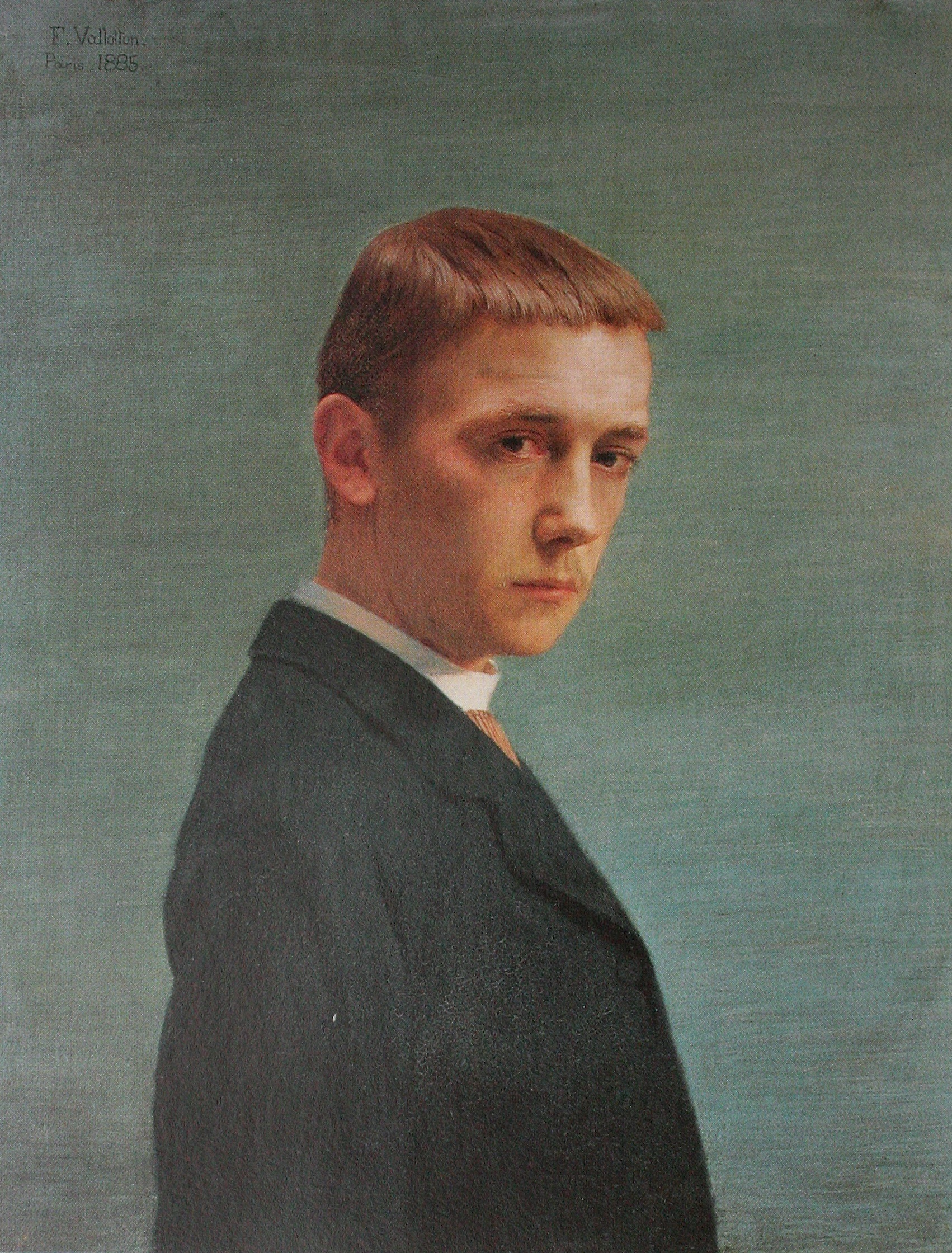
Self-portrait at 20 years old, oil on canvas (1885)

In 1885 the methodical Vallotton began keeping a notebook, called his Livre de Raison, in which he listed all of his paintings, drawings, sculptures and prints. He kept the log his entire life. When he died, it listed one thousand seven hundred works. In the same year he presented his first works at the Paris Salon, the Ingresque Portrait of Monsieur Ursenbach, as well as his first painted self-portrait, which received an honorable mention. That same year he also presented a painting at the Salon des beaux-arts in Geneva.

== Career ==
=== Early career (1887–1891) ===
In 1887 Vallotton presented two portraits at the Salon, the Portrait de Félix Jasinski and Les Parents de l'artiste, which demonstrated his skill but also, by their extreme realism, departed from the traditions of portrait painting. They were severely criticized by his professor, Jules Lefebvre. Vallotton increasingly began to work outside of the Académie Julien. He began to have financial difficulties; his father, whose firm was having its own financial problems, was unable to support him. His health also suffered, as he came down with typhoid fever and then a bout of depression. In 1889 he returned to Zermatt, Switzerland for several weeks to recover, and there painted several Alpine landscapes. In 1889 he also met Hélene Chatenay, an employee in a Swiss factory or shop, who became his companion for ten years.

He presented several paintings at the Paris Universal Exposition of 1889, and at the same exposition he saw the gallery of Japanese prints, particularly works by Hokusai, which were to greatly influence his work. To earn his living, Vallotton worked as an art restorer for the gallery owner Henri Haro. In 1890, he became an art critic for the Swiss newspaper La Gazette de Lausanne, writing some thirty articles about the Paris art world until 1897. In the same year he made a European tour, visiting Berlin, Prague, and Venice. He was particularly impressed by Italy, and returned there frequently in later years.

In 1891, he showed his canvases for the last time in the official Salon des Artistes, and for the first time participated in the more avant-garde Salon des Indépendants, displaying six paintings. He began to receive commissions from Swiss art patrons. He experimented more frequently with various ways of making prints, using a technique called xylographie, in which he became very adept. He executed his first woodcut, a portrait of Paul Verlaine. His method was to make a very precise and detailed drawing, and then to simplify and simplify. His work was noticed by the writer and journalist Octave Uzanne, who published an article describing his work as "The renaissance of the woodcut".

The meticulous style of painting seen in the works of Vallotton's early period reached its zenith in The Patient, a canvas in which his companion, Hélene Chatenay, portrays an invalid. Completed in 1892, it was Vallotton's last major painting before he began to introduce into his painted works the simplifying style he was developing in his woodcuts.

=== With the Nabis (1892–1900) ===
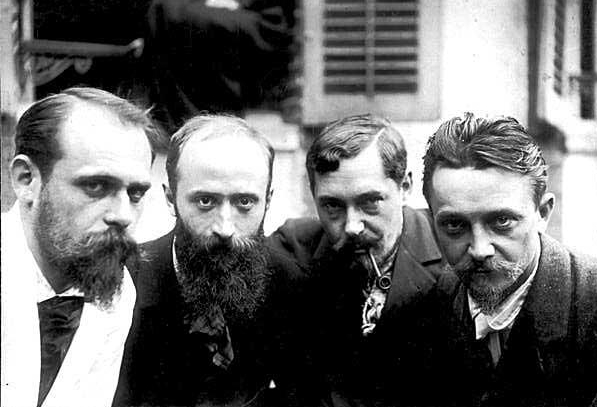
Ker-Xavier Roussel, Édouard Vuillard, Romain Coolus, and Félix Vallotton in 1899

In 1892, he became a member of Les Nabis, a semi-secret, semi-mystical group of young artists, mostly from the Académie Julian, which included Pierre Bonnard, Ker-Xavier Roussel, Maurice Denis, and Édouard Vuillard, with whom Vallotton was to form a lifelong friendship. While the Nabis shared certain common ideas and goals, their styles were quite different and personal. He kept himself somewhat apart from the others, earning his jocular title among the Nabis as "The Foreign Nabi". Vallotton's paintings in this period reflected the style of his woodcuts, with flat areas of color, hard edges, and simplification of detail. His subjects included genre scenes, portraits and nudes. Examples of his Nabi style are the deliberately awkward Bathers on a Summer Evening (1892–93), now in the Kunsthaus Zürich, and the symbolist Moonlight (1895), in the Musée d'Orsay.

His paintings began to be noticed by the public and critics; Bathers on a Summer Evening, presented at the Salon des Indépendants, was met with harsh criticism and laughter. But his woodcuts attracted attention and clients, and he became financially secure. Between 1893 and 1897, he received many commissions for illustrations from notable French newspapers and magazines, including La Revue Blanche, and from foreign art publications, including The Chap-Book of Chicago. He also made woodcuts for the covers of theater programs and book illustrations. One of his prominent patrons was Thadée Natanson, the publisher of the Revue Blanche, and his wife Misia, who commissioned many important decorative works from the Nabis. Through the Natansons, Vallotton was introduced to the avant-garde elite of Paris, including Stéphane Mallarmé, Marcel Proust, Eric Satie, and Claude Debussy.

His woodcut subjects included domestic scenes, bathing women, portrait heads, and several images of street crowds and demonstrations—notably, several scenes of police attacking anarchists. He usually depicted types rather than individuals, eschewed the expression of strong emotion, and "fuse[d] a graphic wit with an acerbic if not ironic humor". Vallotton's graphic art reached its highest development in Intimités (Intimacies), a series of ten interiors published in 1898 by the Revue Blanche, which deal with tension between men and women. Vallotton's woodcuts were widely disseminated in periodicals and books in Europe as well as in the United States, and have been suggested as a significant influence on the graphic art of Edvard Munch, Aubrey Beardsley, and Ernst Ludwig Kirchner.

In 1898 he bought a Kodak no.2 'Bullet' and experimented with it as a basis for at least five interior paintings. His first photos were taken in: Chateau d'Etretat, Chateau de la Naz, the Natansons' summer house above Cannes, and the Villa Beaulieu in Honfleur. Art historian Anca I Lasc suggests Woman in Blue Rummaging Through a Cupboard (1903) was based on a photograph taken in Vallotton's own Paris home on Rue Milan or rue de Belles Feuilles. Therefore, his paintings were most likely based on real interiors.

By 1900, the Nabis had drifted apart. One source of the division was the Dreyfus affair, the case of a Jewish army officer falsely accused of aiding the Germans. The Nabis were divided, with Vallotton passionately defending Dreyfus. He produced a series of satirical woodcuts on the affair, including The Age of the Newspaper, which were published on the frontpage of Le Cri de Paris on January 23, 1898, at the height of the affair.

Another major event during this period was his marriage in 1899 to Gabrielle Rodrigues-Hénriques, the widowed daughter of Alexandre Bernheim, one of the most successful art dealers in Europe and founder of the Galerie Bernheim-Jeune. The union brought to his household three children from her previous marriage.

There are few interiors by Vallotton that show children except for Dinner by Lamplight showing his stepson Max, stepdaughter Madeline, with Gabrielle on his right with the back of the own artist's head.

After a brief honeymoon in Switzerland, they moved to a large apartment on near the Gare Saint-Lazare train station. The marriage brought him financial security, and he gradually abandoned woodcuts as his main source of income. He also established a solid relationship with the Bernheim family and their gallery, which presented a special exhibition devoted to the Nabis, including ten of his works. Thereafter he devoted his attention almost entirely to painting.

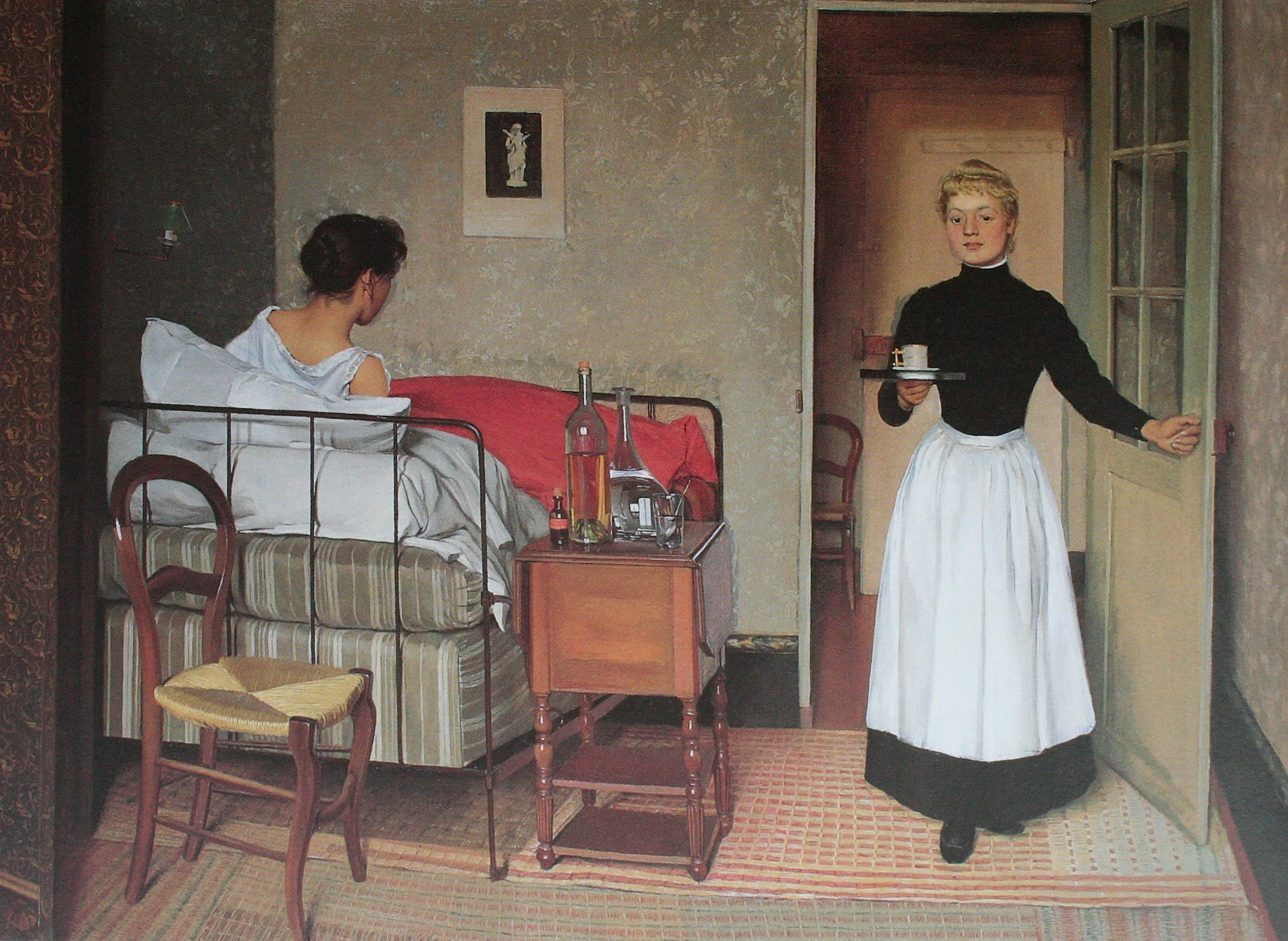
The Patient (1892), private collection

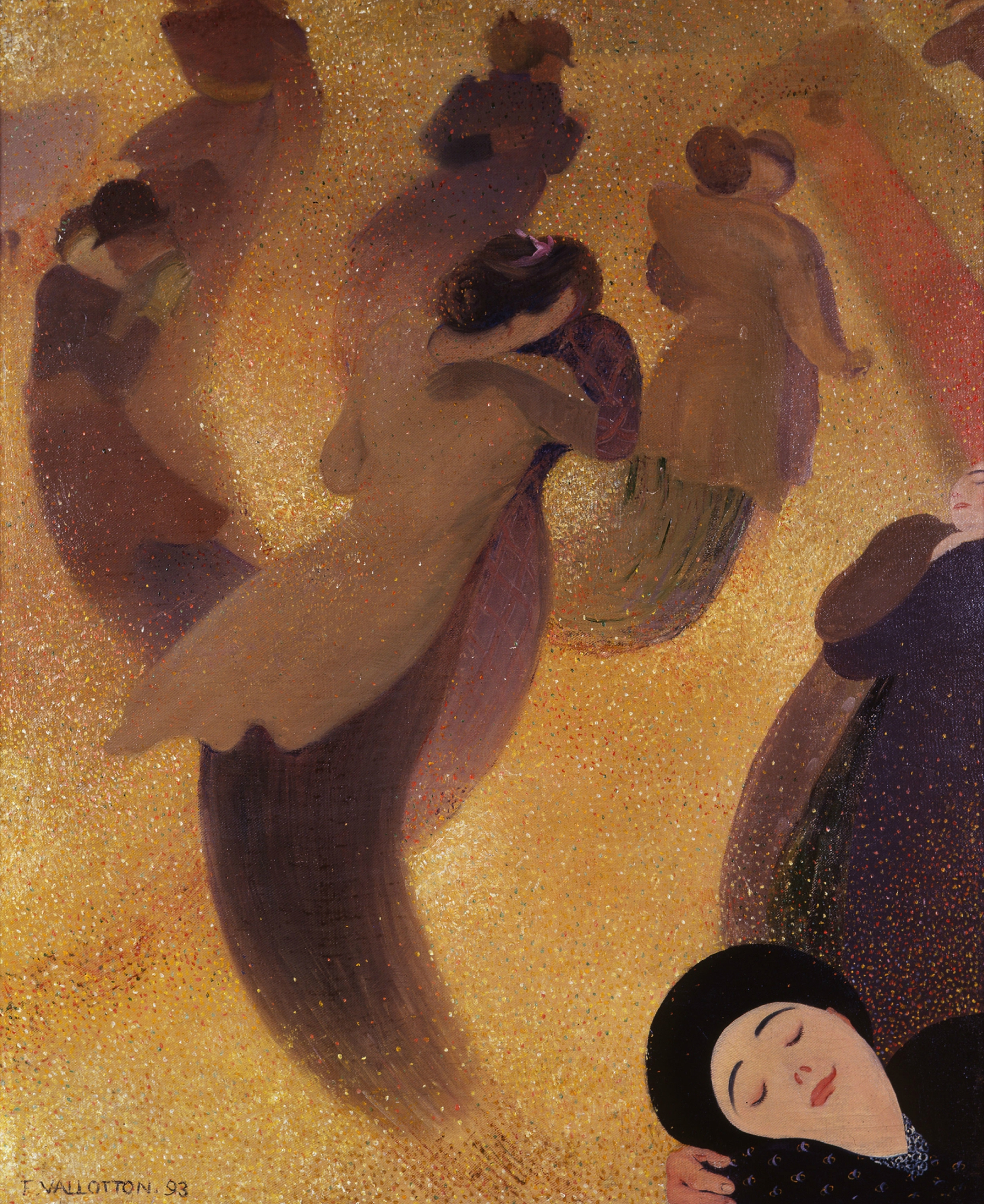
Waltz (1893), Museum of modern art André Malraux - MuMa, Le Havre

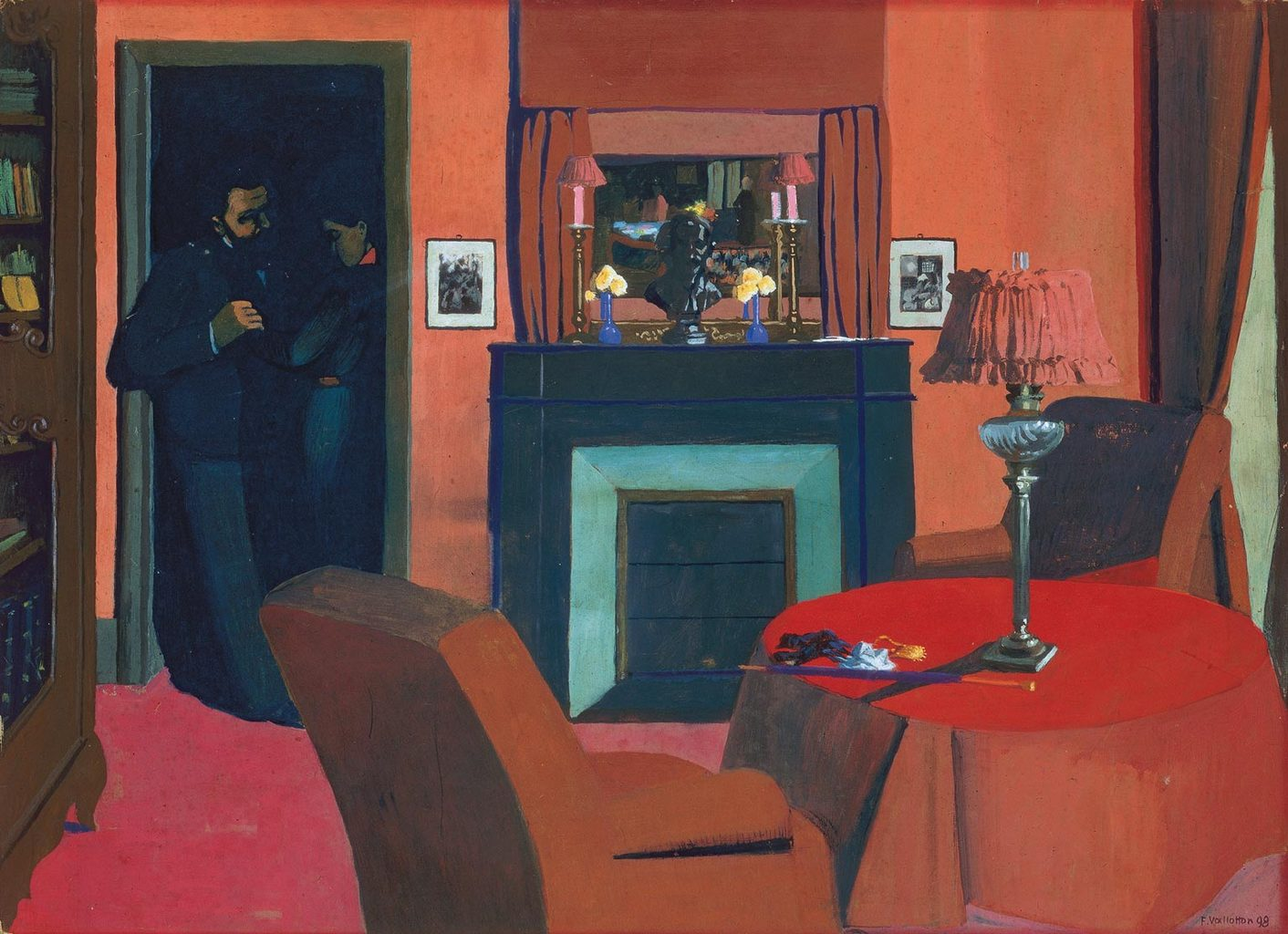
La Chambre rouge (1898), tempera on board

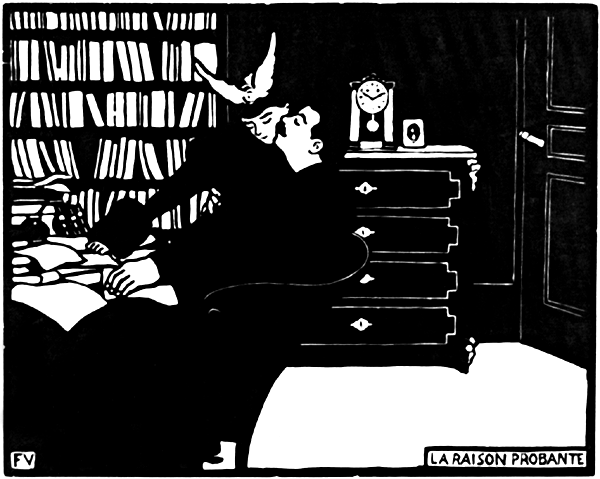
La raison probante (The Cogent Reason), a woodcut from the series Intimités (1898)

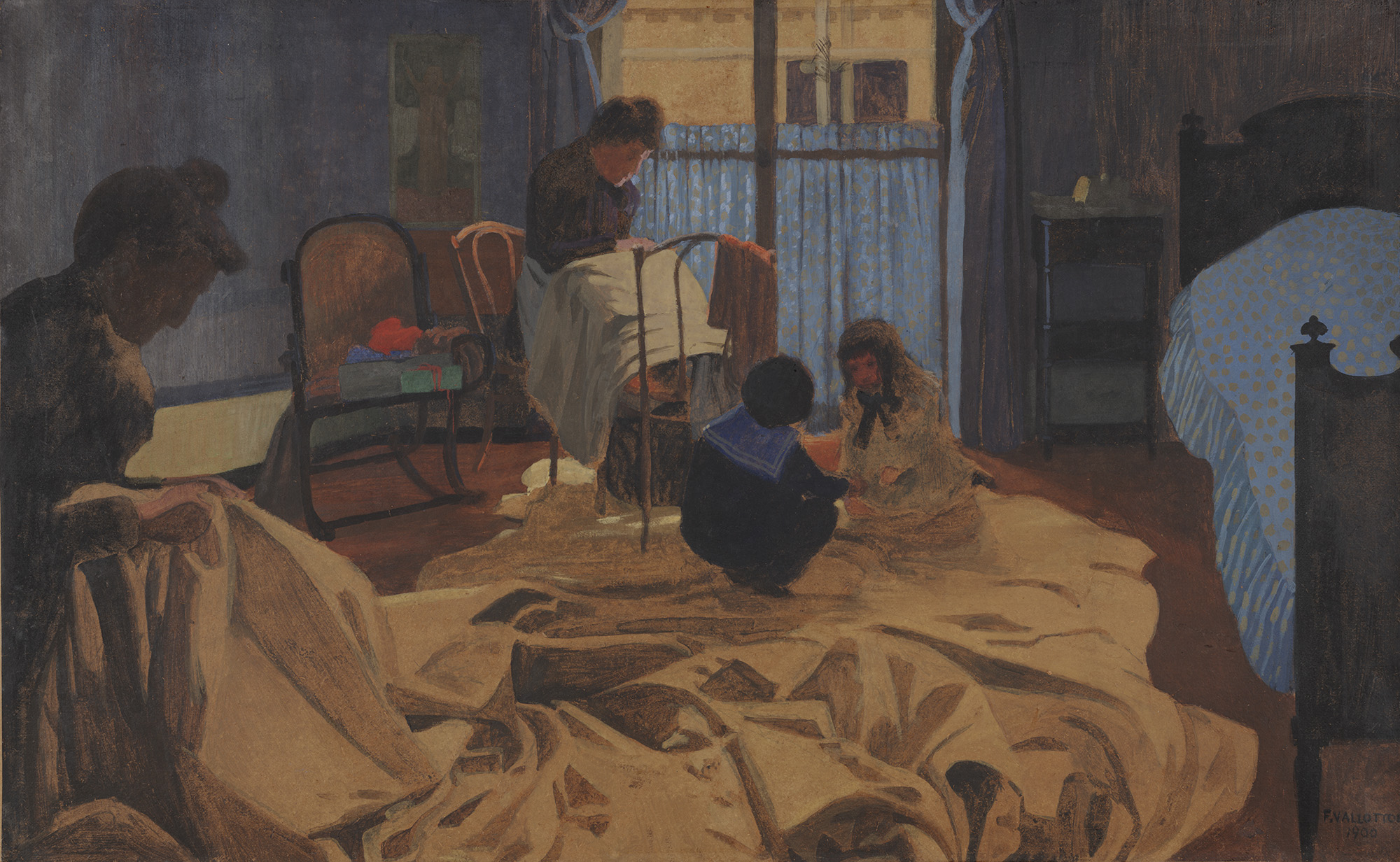
The Laundress, Blue Room (1900)

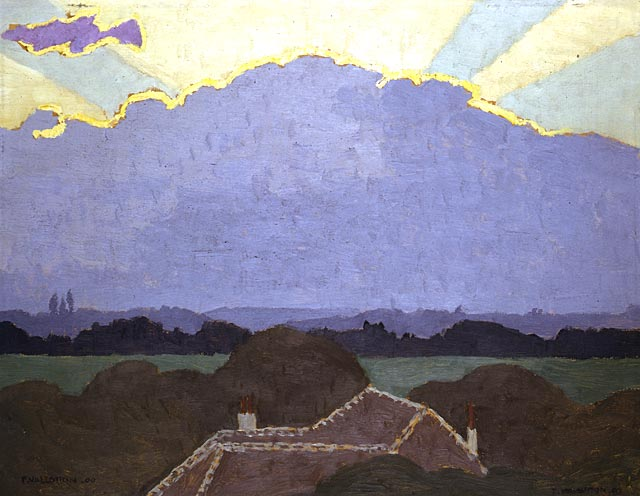
Cloud in Romanel (1900)

=== After the Nabis (1901–1914) ===
In the years after the Nabis, the reputation of Vallotton grew. In January 1903, he presented a selection of his works at exposition of painters of the Vienna Secession, and sold several works. In May 1903, the Bernheim gallery gave him a one-man show, which brought him good reviews. At the end of the year, the French government made its first purchase of one of his paintings for the Luxembourg Museum, then Paris's leading museum of modern art.

Despite his successes, his financial situation was still precarious. He experimented for a time with sculpture. He continued to publish occasional art criticism, in addition to other writings. He wrote eight plays, some of which received performances (in 1904 and 1907), although their reviews appear to have been unfavorable. He also wrote three novels, including the semi-autobiographical La Vie meurtrière (The Murderous Life), begun in 1907 and published posthumously.

His fortunes changed for the better at the beginning of 1907, with a show at the Bernheim-Jeune Gallery and the sale of thirteen paintings. He also presented a painting, Three women and a girl playing in the water, at the Salon of the Société des Artistes Indépendants, which received good reviews. He made a trip to Italy with Gabrielle, and on his return painted The Turkish Bath, which was praised by among others the poet and critic Guillaume Apollinaire.

Vallotton's paintings of the post-Nabi period had admirers, and were generally respected for their truthfulness and their technical qualities, but the severity of his style was frequently criticized. Typical is the reaction of the critic who, writing in the March 23, 1910 issue of Neue Zürcher Zeitung, complained that Vallotton "paints like a policeman, like someone whose job it is to catch forms and colors. Everything creaks with an intolerable dryness ... the colors lack all joyfulness." In its uncompromising character his art prefigured the New Objectivity that flourished in Germany during the 1920s, and has a further parallel in the work of Edward Hopper.

In 1912 the French government offered him the Legion of Honour, but like his fellow Nabis Pierre Bonnard and Édouard Vuillard, he declined.

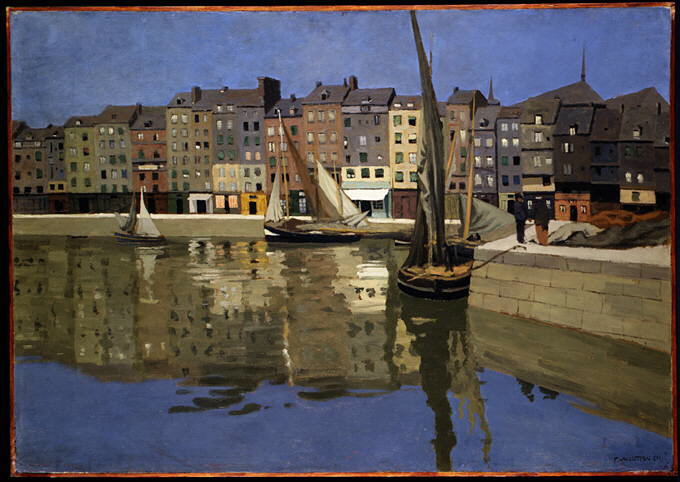
The Port of Honfleur at Night (1901) Metropolitan Museum of Art

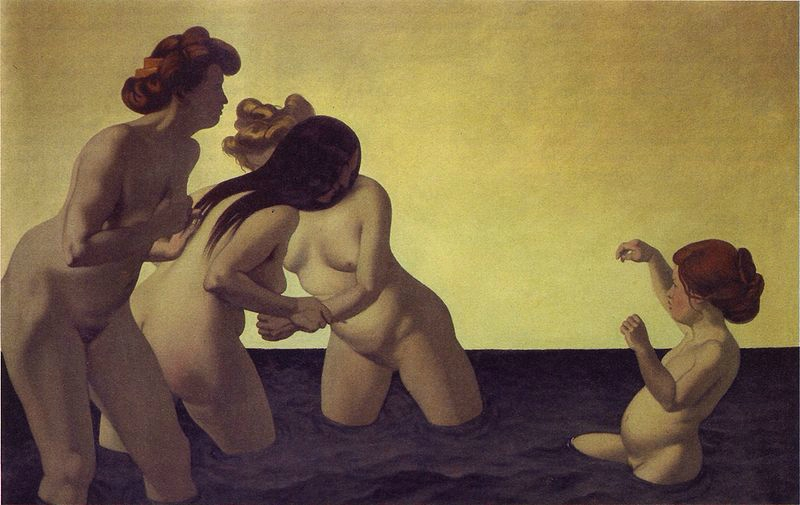
Three Women and a Little Girl Playing in the Water (1907)

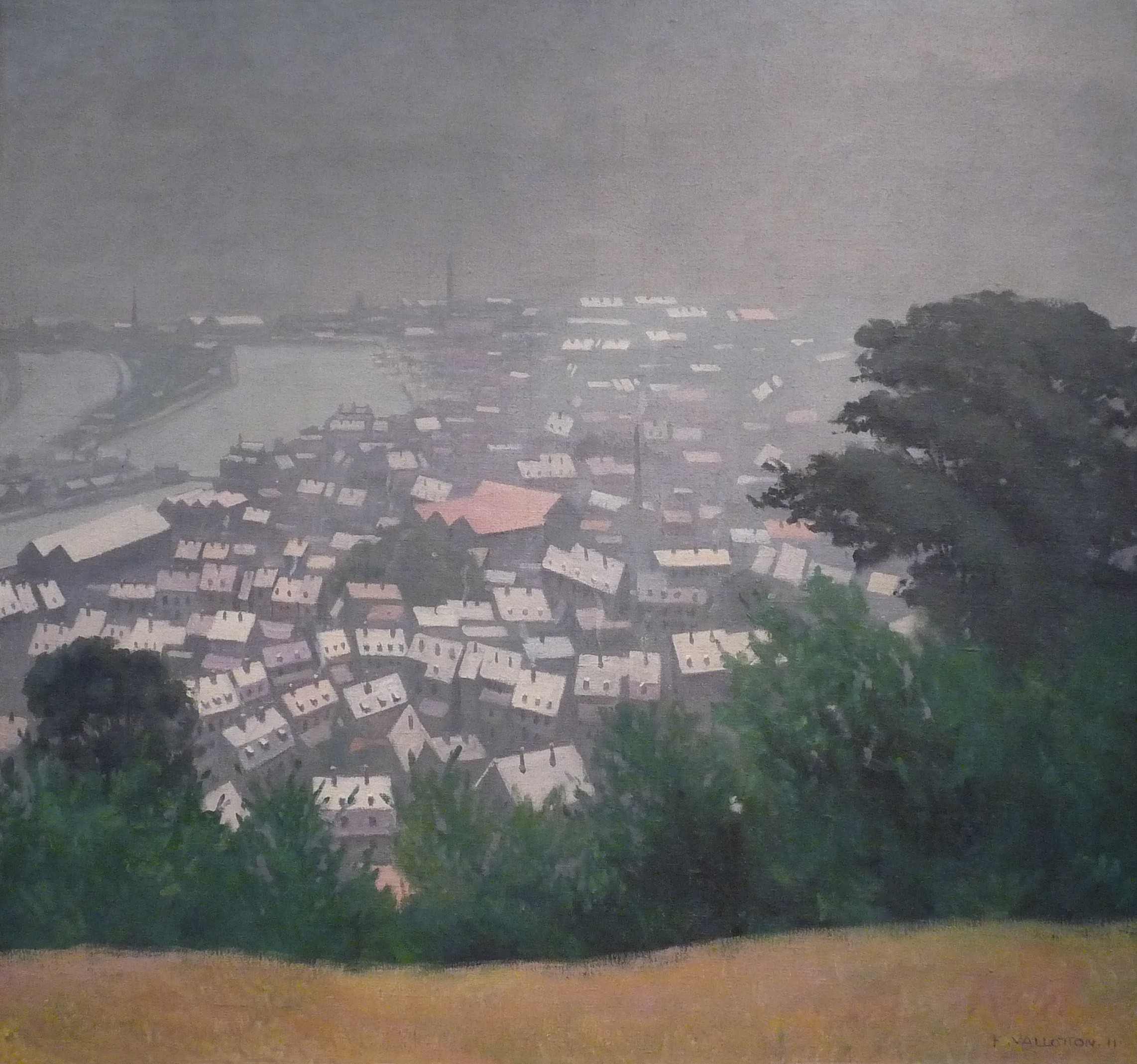
Honfleur dans la brume (Honfleur in the Mist), 1911

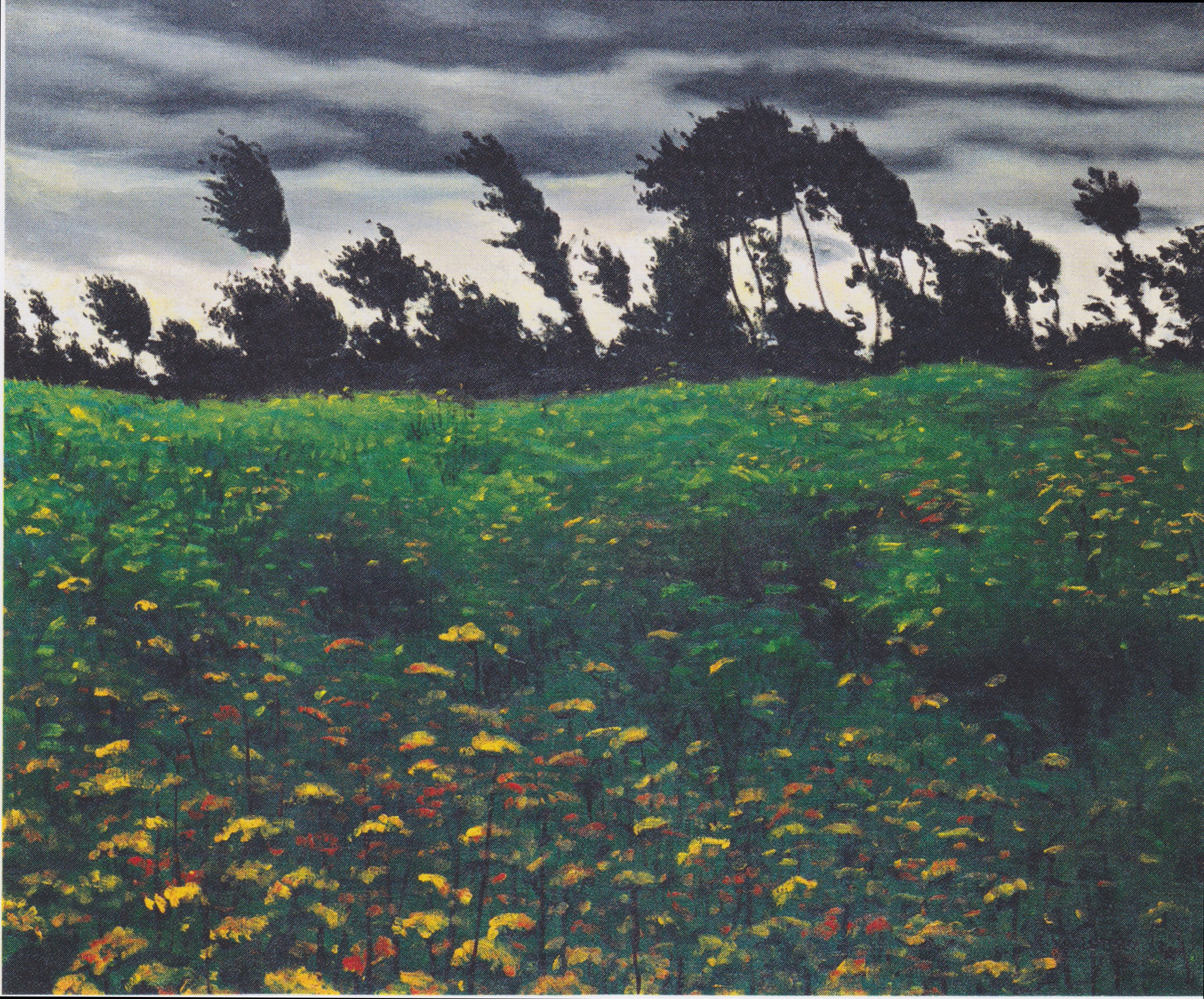
Blooming Fields (1912)

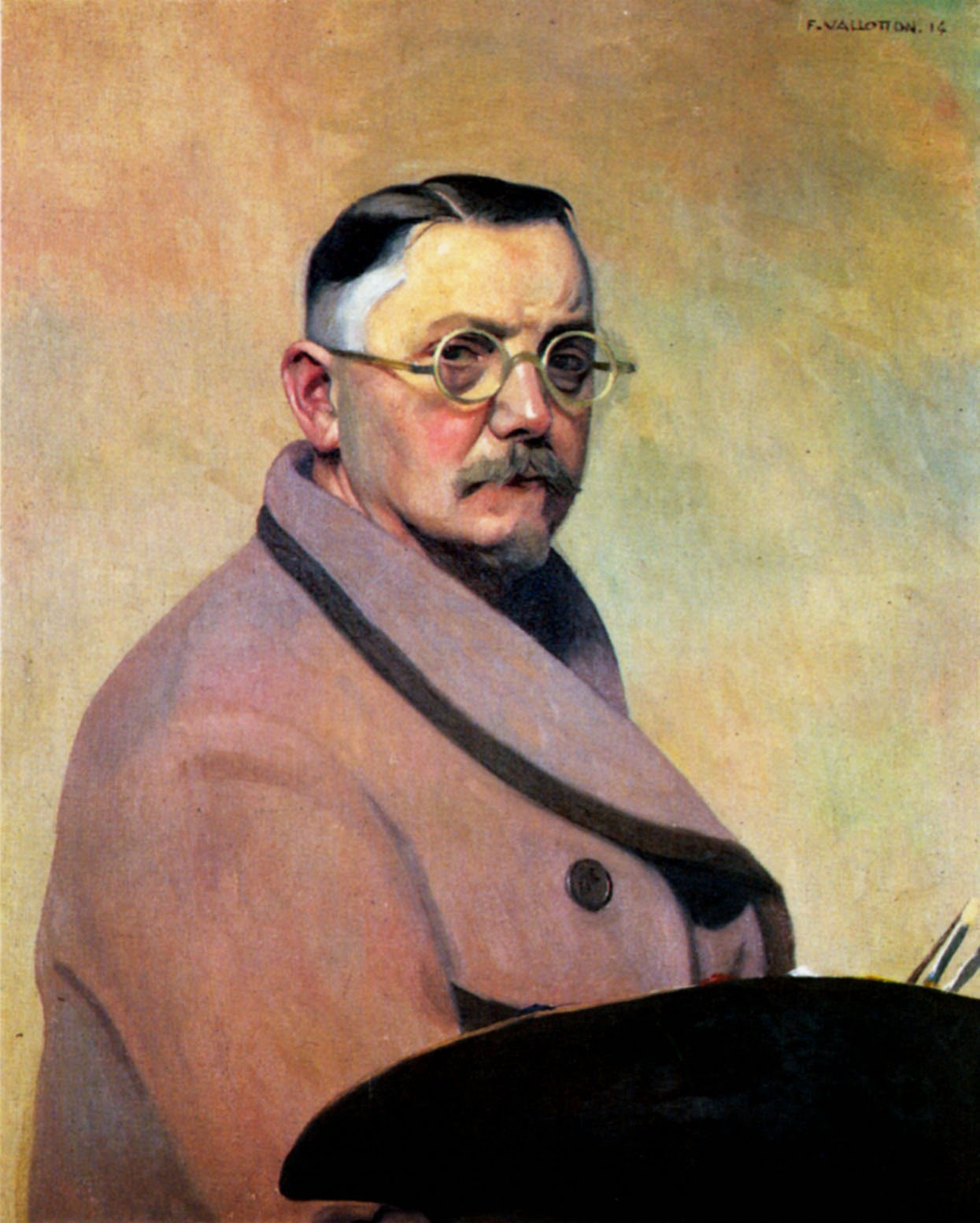
Self-portrait (1914)

=== The First World War and final years (1915–1925) ===
The Swiss Vallotton had been naturalized as a French citizen in 1900. When World War I began in August 1914, he volunteered for the army. He was rejected because of his age (forty-eight), but did what he could do for the war effort. In 1915–16, he returned to the medium of woodcut for the first time since 1901 to express his feelings for his adopted country in the series, This is War, his last prints. In June 1917, the Ministry of Fine Arts sent him, along with two other artists, for a three-week tour of the front lines. The sketches he produced became the basis for a group of paintings, The Church of Souain in Silhouette among them, in which he recorded with cool detachment the ruined landscape. The works made by the three artists were presented at the Musée du Luxembourg.

After the end of the war, Vallotton concentrated especially on still lifes and on "composite landscapes", landscapes composed in the studio from memory and imagination, and on flamboyantly erotic nudes. He had persistent health problems, and he and his wife passed the winters in Cagnes-sur-Mer in Provence, where they bought a small house, and Honfleur in Normandy, where they had a summer house. By the end of his life he had completed over 1700 paintings and about 200 prints, in addition to hundreds of drawings and several sculptures. He died in 1925 on the day after his 60th birthday, following cancer surgery in Paris.

A retrospective exhibition by the Salon des Indépendants took place in 1926. Some of Vallotton's works were exhibited at the Grand Palais, along with works by van Gogh, Modigliani, Seurat, Toulouse-Lautrec, Schützenberger and others.

Vallotton's brother Paul was an art dealer and founded the Galerie Paul Vallotton in Lausanne in 1922, which continued operation for many years under the control of his descendants. Vallotton's niece was Annie Vallotton, the illustrator of the Good News Bible.

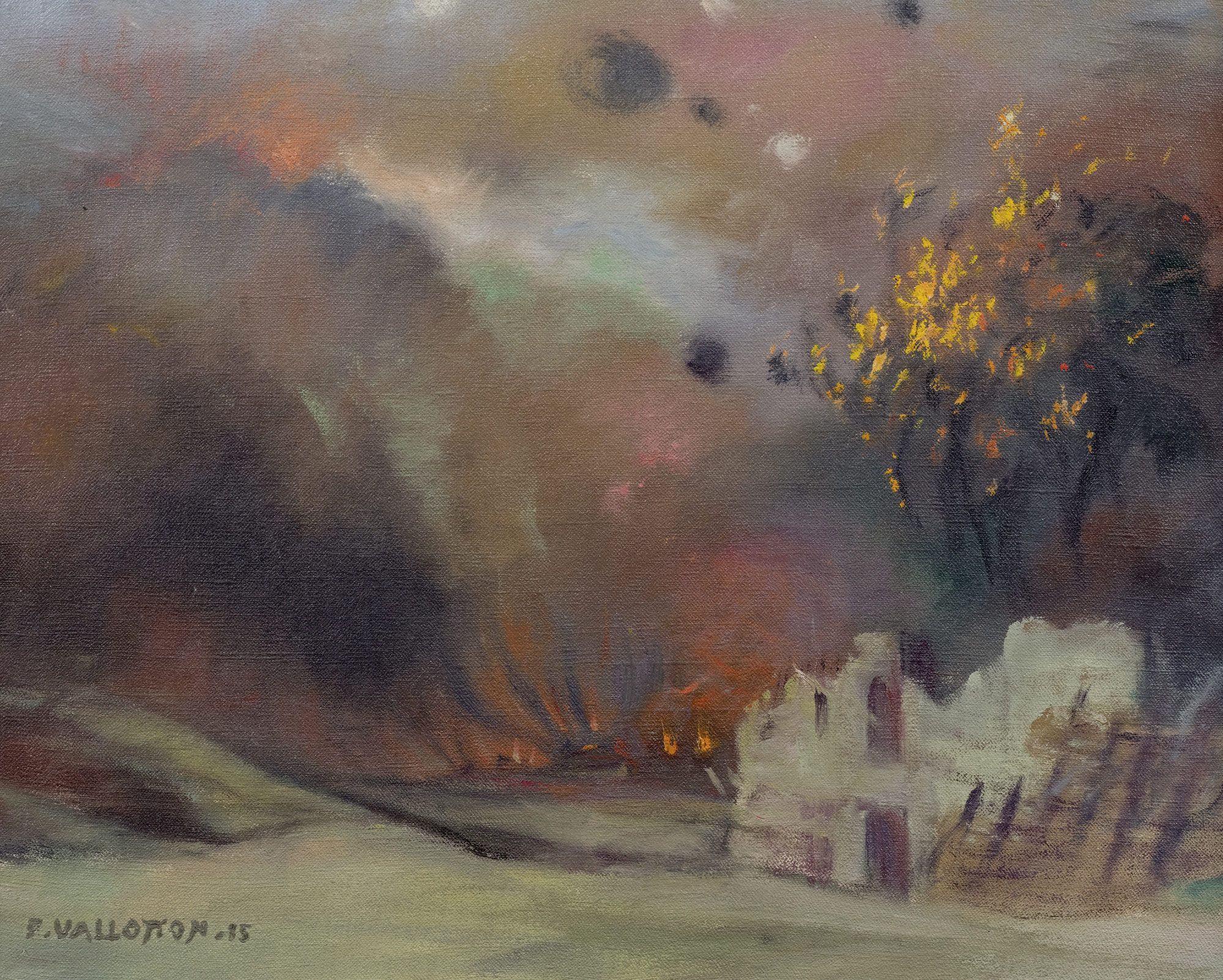
War (Study), 1915

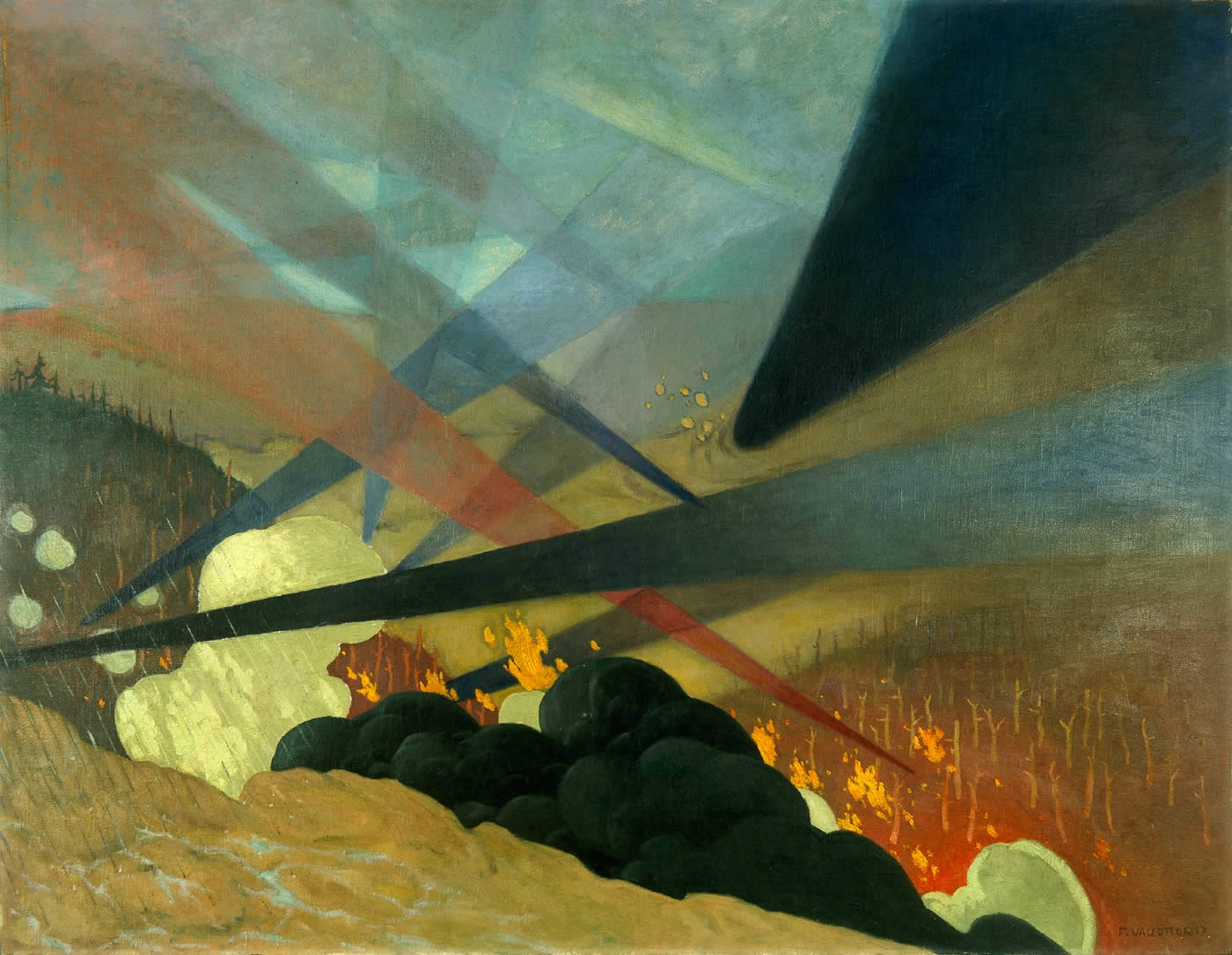
Verdun (1917), The Army Museum (Paris)

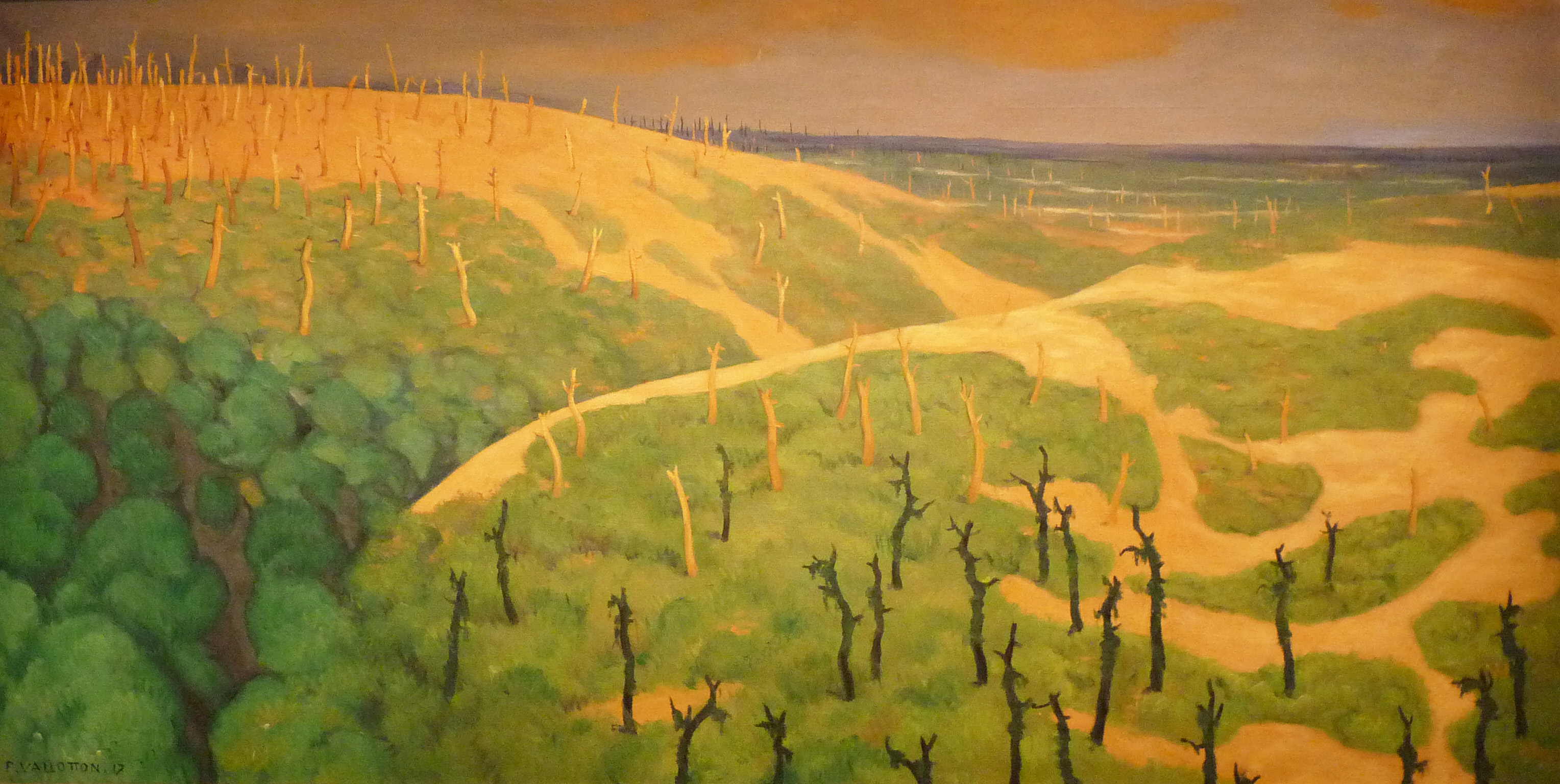
Le Bois de la Gruerie et le ravin des Meurissons (1917)

Landscape (1918)

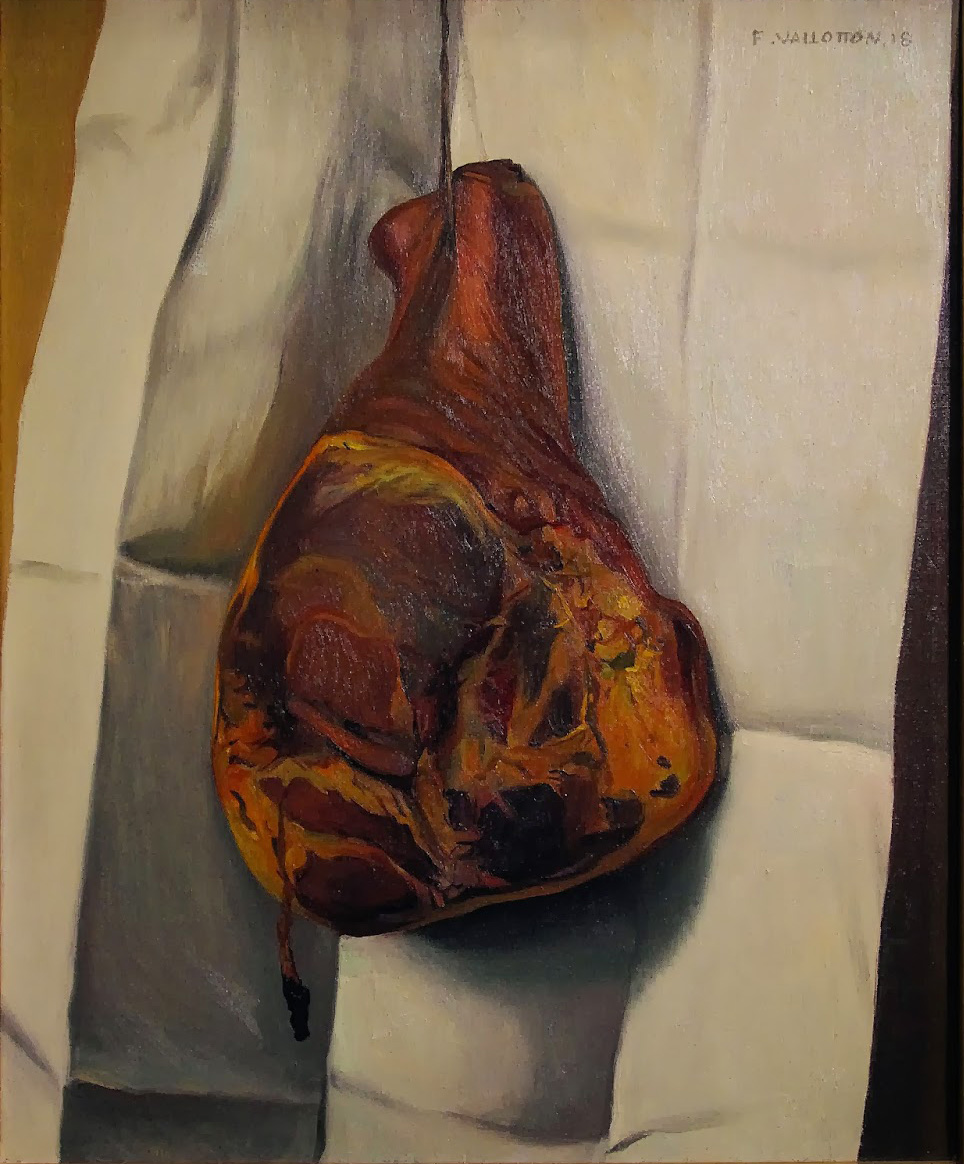
The Ham (1918)

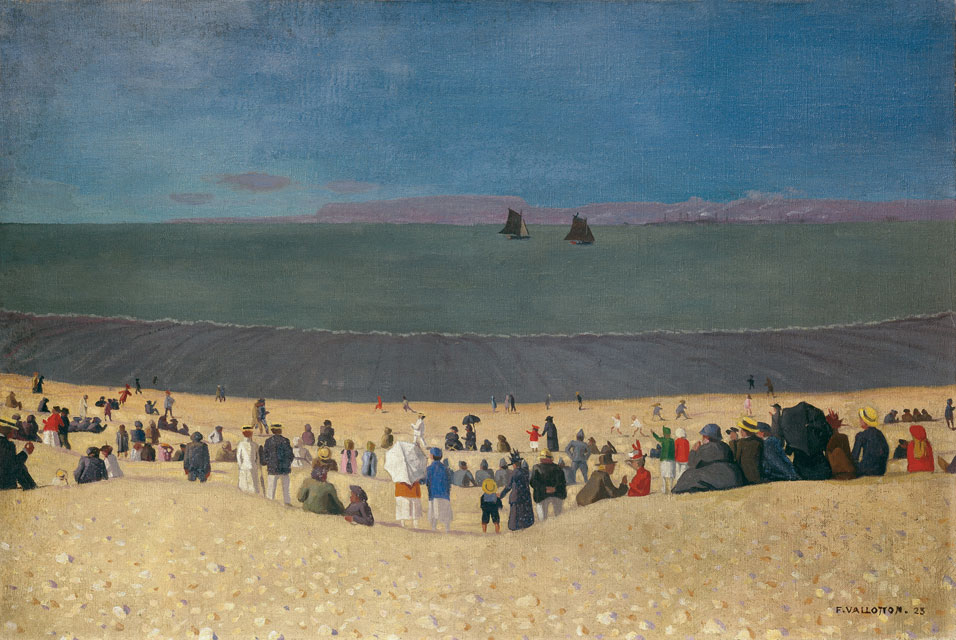
La plage à Honfleur (1919)

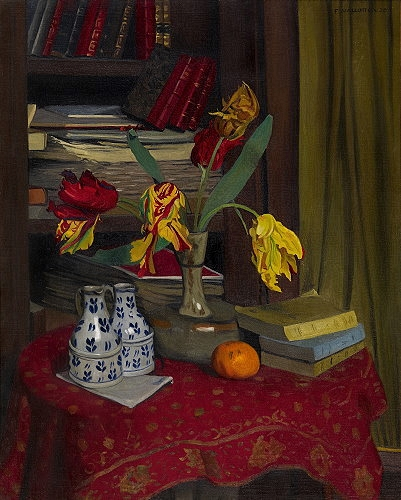
Tulips (1920)

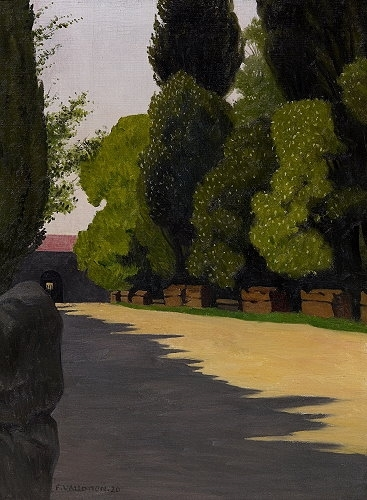
Alyscamps Morning Sun (1920)

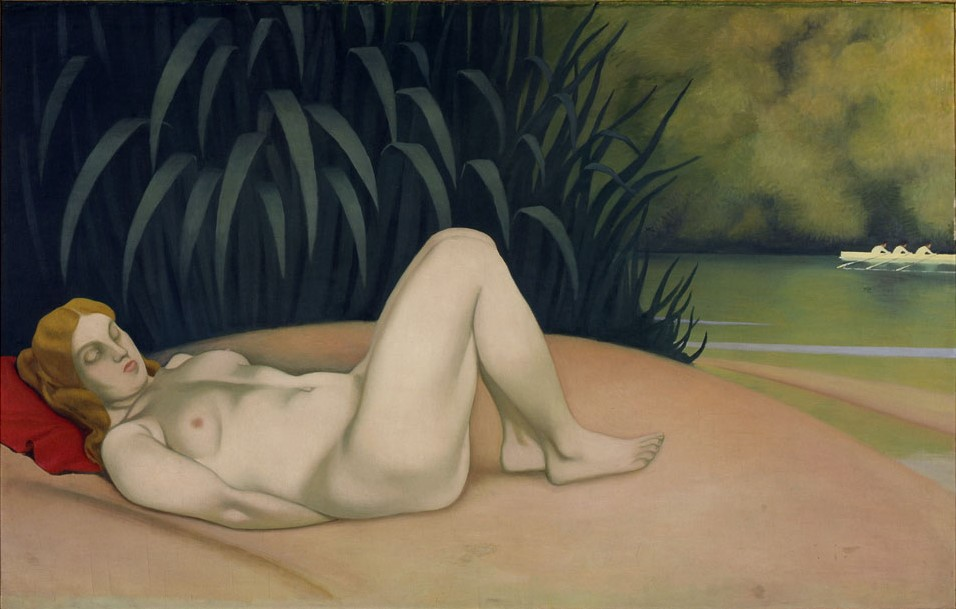
Femme nue dormant au bord de l'eau, 1921

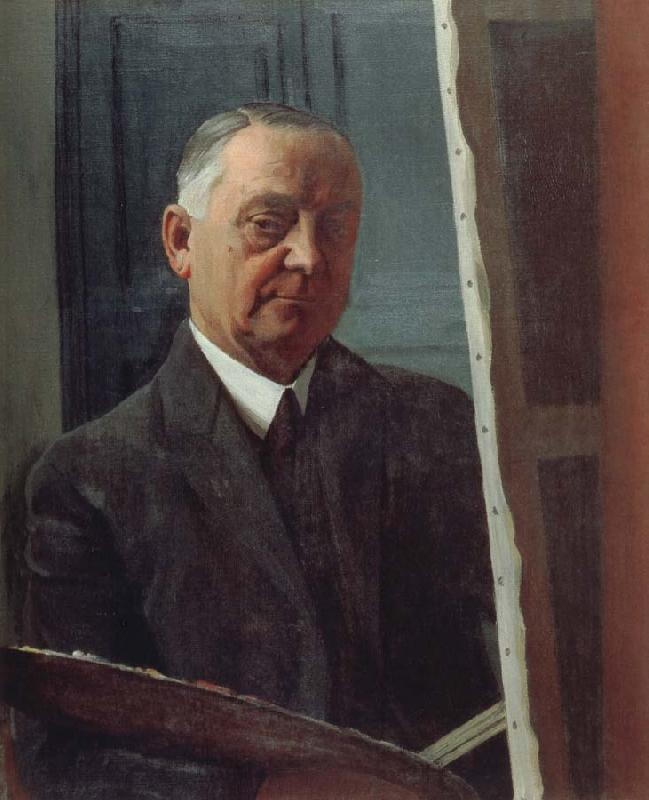
Self-portrait (1923)

== Paintings ==
=== Paris scenes ===
During his Nabi period in the 1890s, Vallotton was living largely from the income he made making illustrations for fashion magazines and popular novels, He created a series of paintings called Scenes of the Paris streets, probably for a novel by Octave Uzanne called Les Rassemblements. The paintings, using tempera on cardboard, used the Nabi trademark method of flat areas of color, and the Nabi-influenced use of aerial and other unusual perspectives taken from Japanese prints. These works also expressed his social and political attitudes, contrasting the workers struggling to carry heavy sacks with the fashionable women in bright colors carrying wrapped packages from the new Paris department stores. He captured the activity and color inside Bon Marché and the other new Paris department stores. His street scenes were filled with activity and movement, capturing small scenes that appealed to his sense of humor or irony.

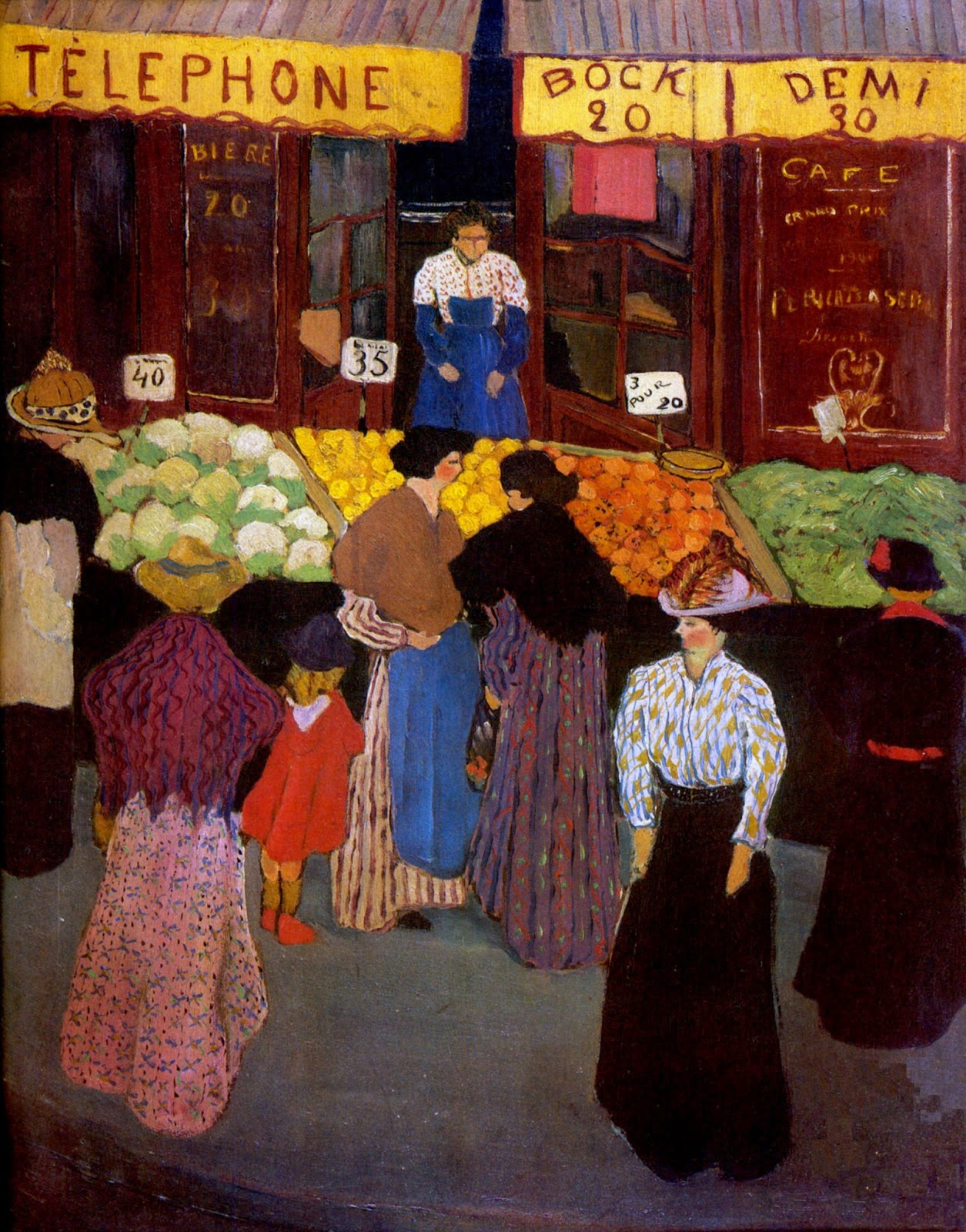
At the Market (1887)

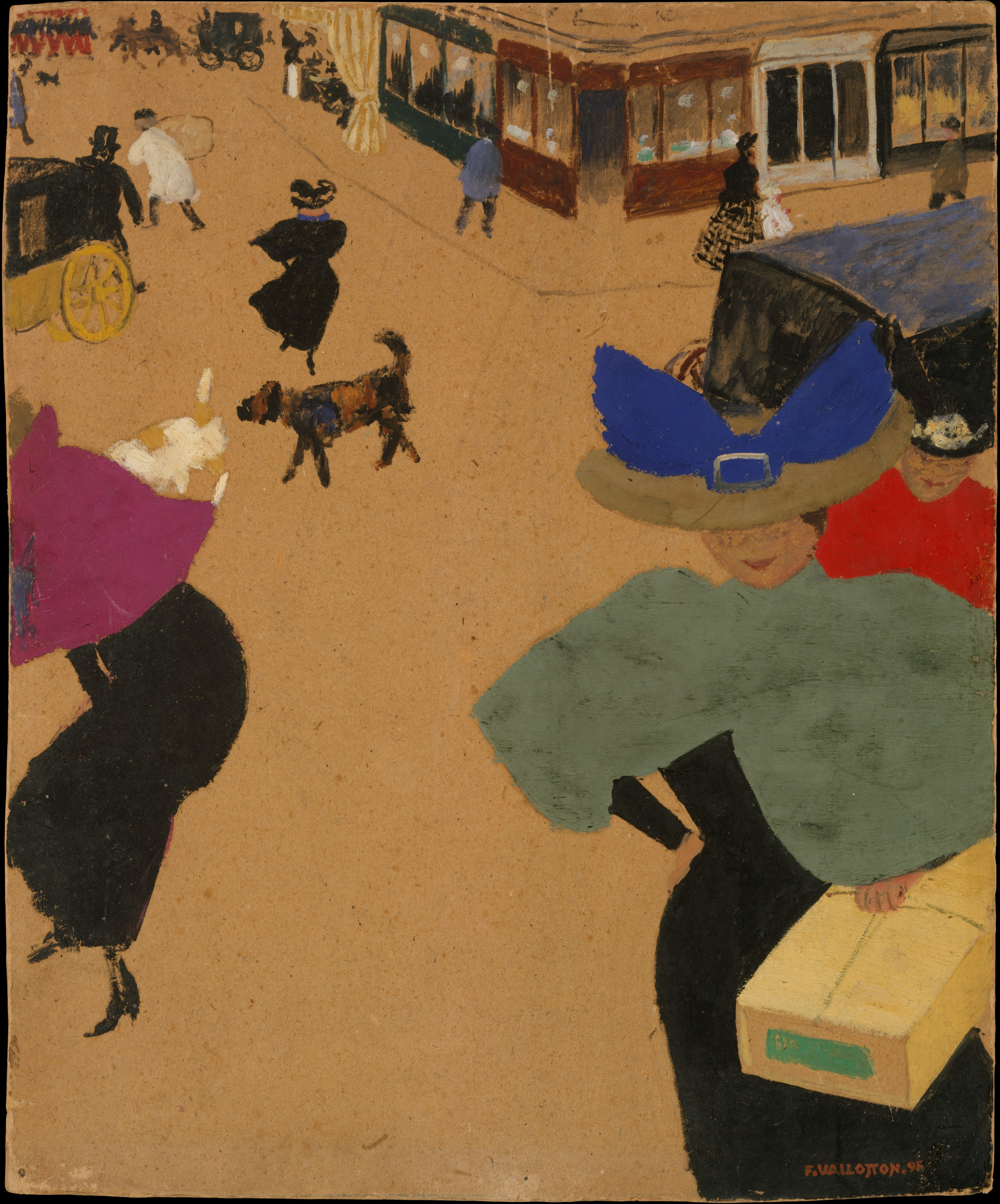
Street Scene in Paris (1895), tempera on board, Metropolitan Museum of Art

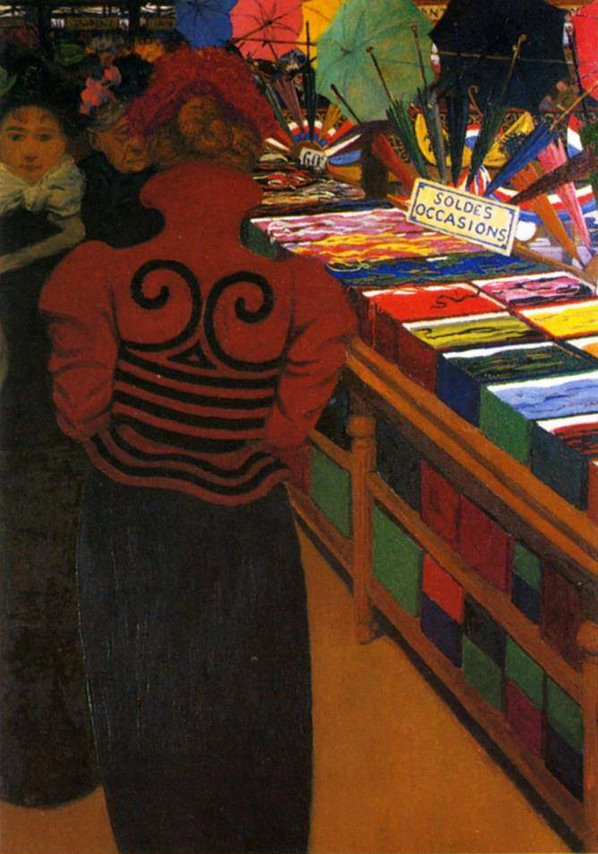
Bon Marché (1898), right panel of a triptych showing shoppers in a department store

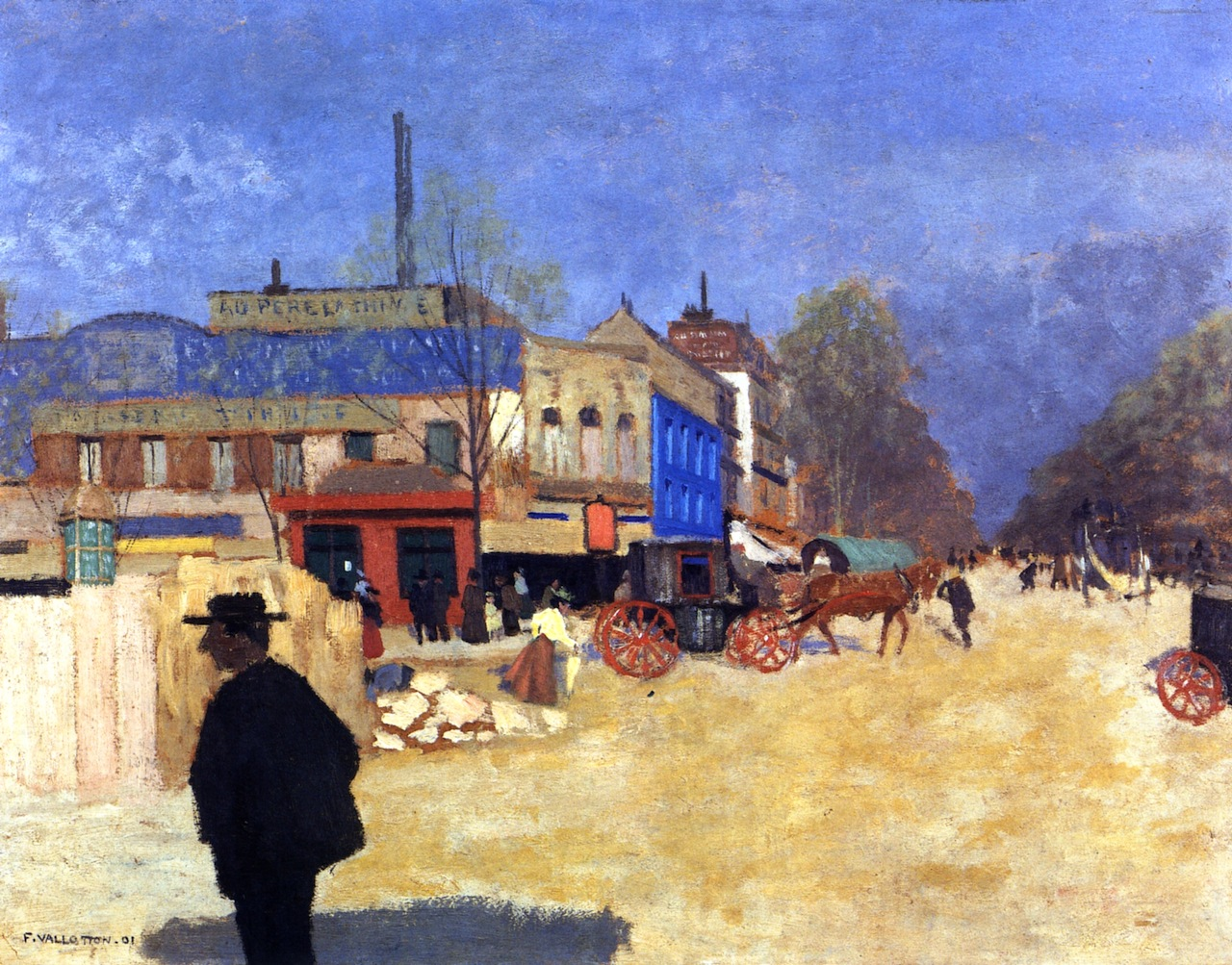
Place Clichy (1901)

=== Landscapes and seascapes ===
Vallotton's landscapes and seascapes avoided conventional views and techniques, and presented unusual viewpoints and perspectives. The scene is sometimes seen from above, with the horizon very high in the picture, or without the sky being visible at all. The forms are simplified, and the figures are often small and almost unrecognizable. In his famous The Ball of 1899 (Musée d'Orsay), the scene is viewed from above, with three tiny figures: a girl chasing a ball and two mysterious figures in the distance having a conversation. The drama in the picture is the contrast between the sunlight and the shade. In his 1899 painting of laundresses drying clothes on the beach of Étretat, the women are almost unrecognizable as such until the picture is examined closely. He wrote in his journal, "I dream of a painting entirely disengaged from any literal concern about nature. I want to construct landscapes entirely based on the emotions that they have created in me, a few evocative lines, one or two details, chosen, without a superstition of the exactitude of the hour or the lighting."

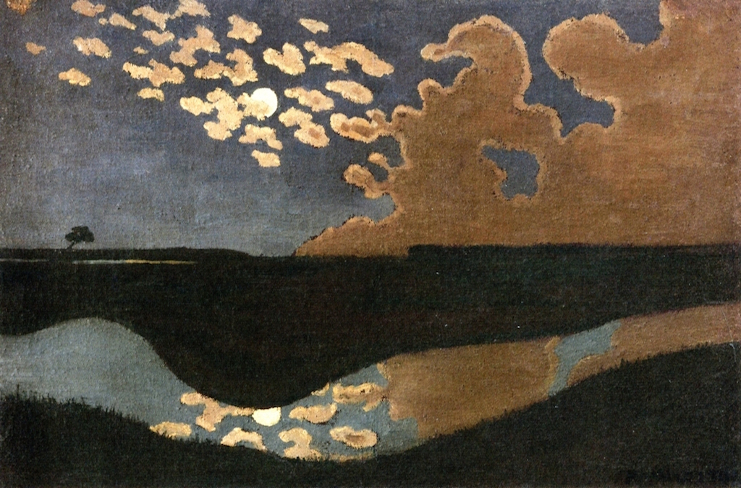
Moonlight (ca. 1894), Musée d'Orsay, Paris

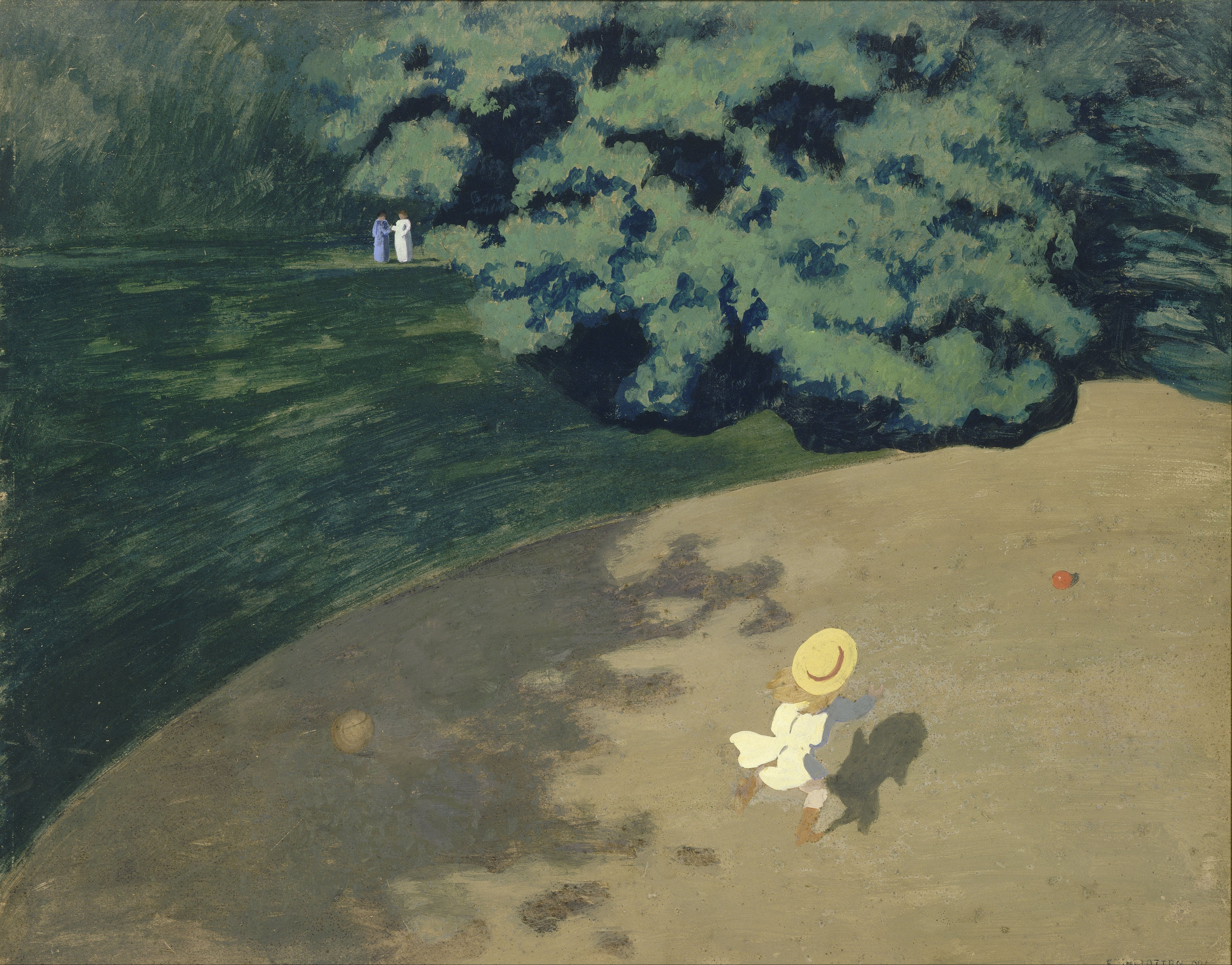
The Ball (1899), Musée d'Orsay, Paris

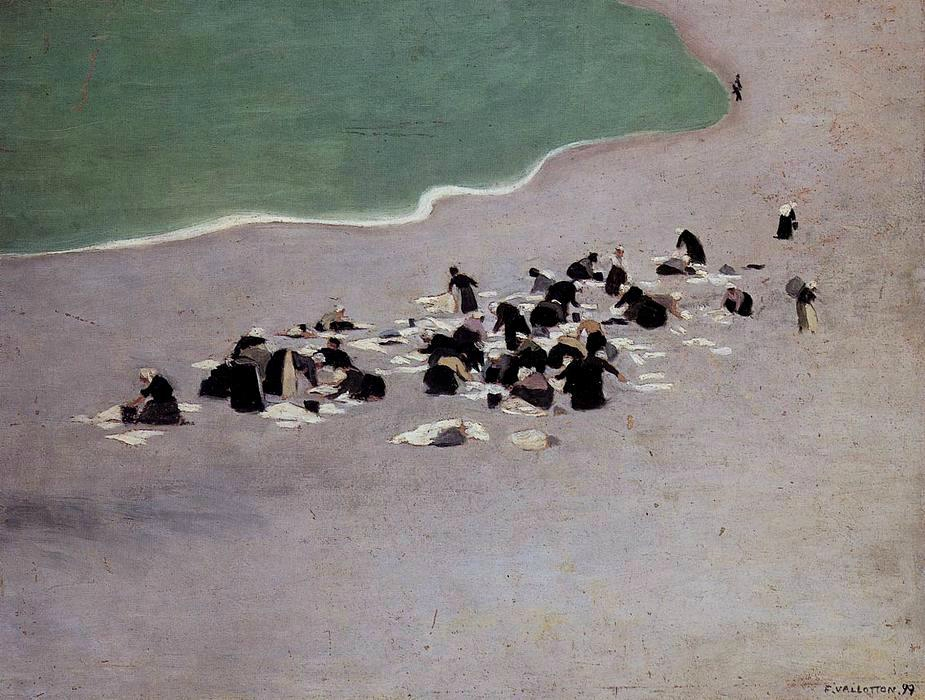
Laundresses at Étretat (1899)

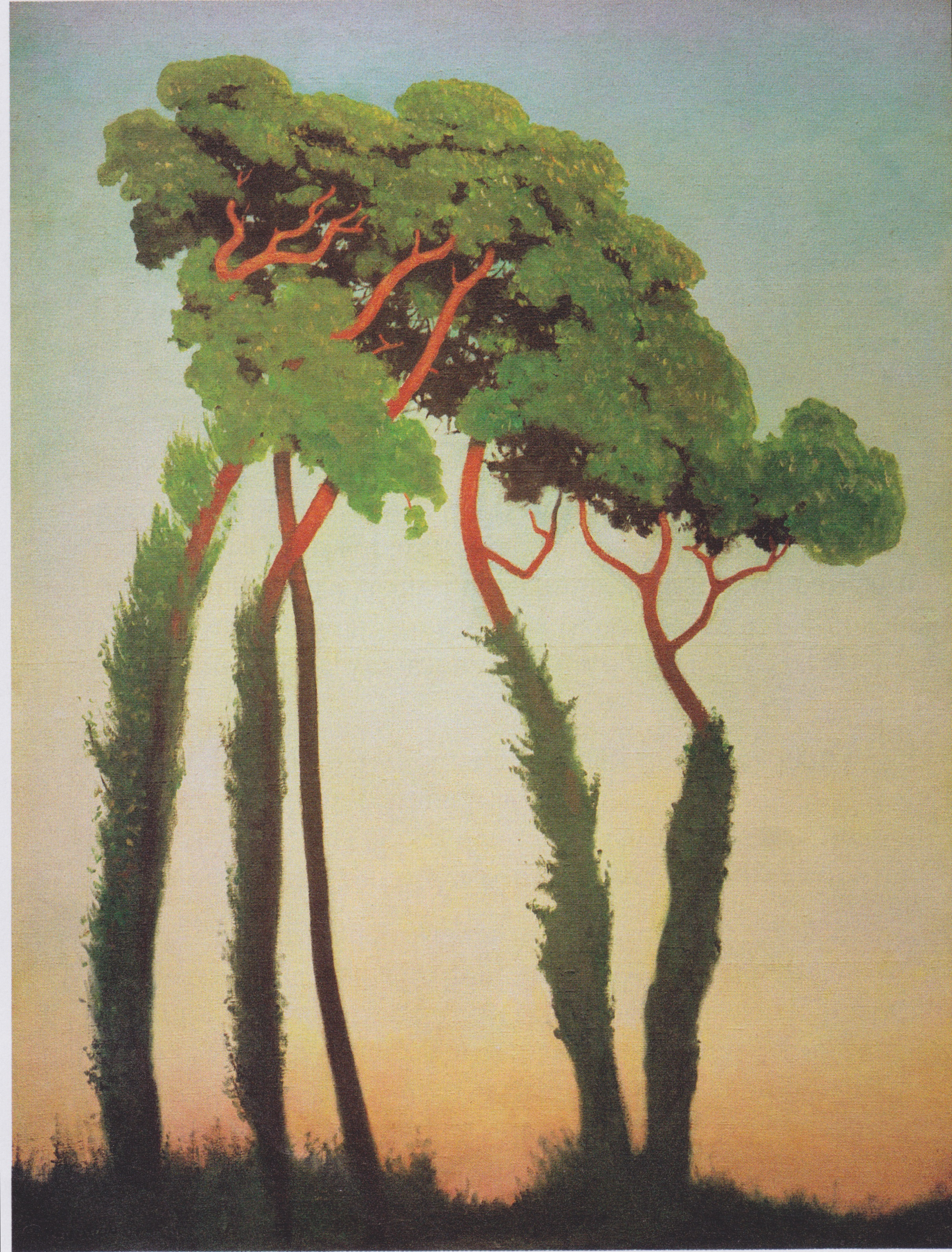
Last rays of Sunshine (1911)

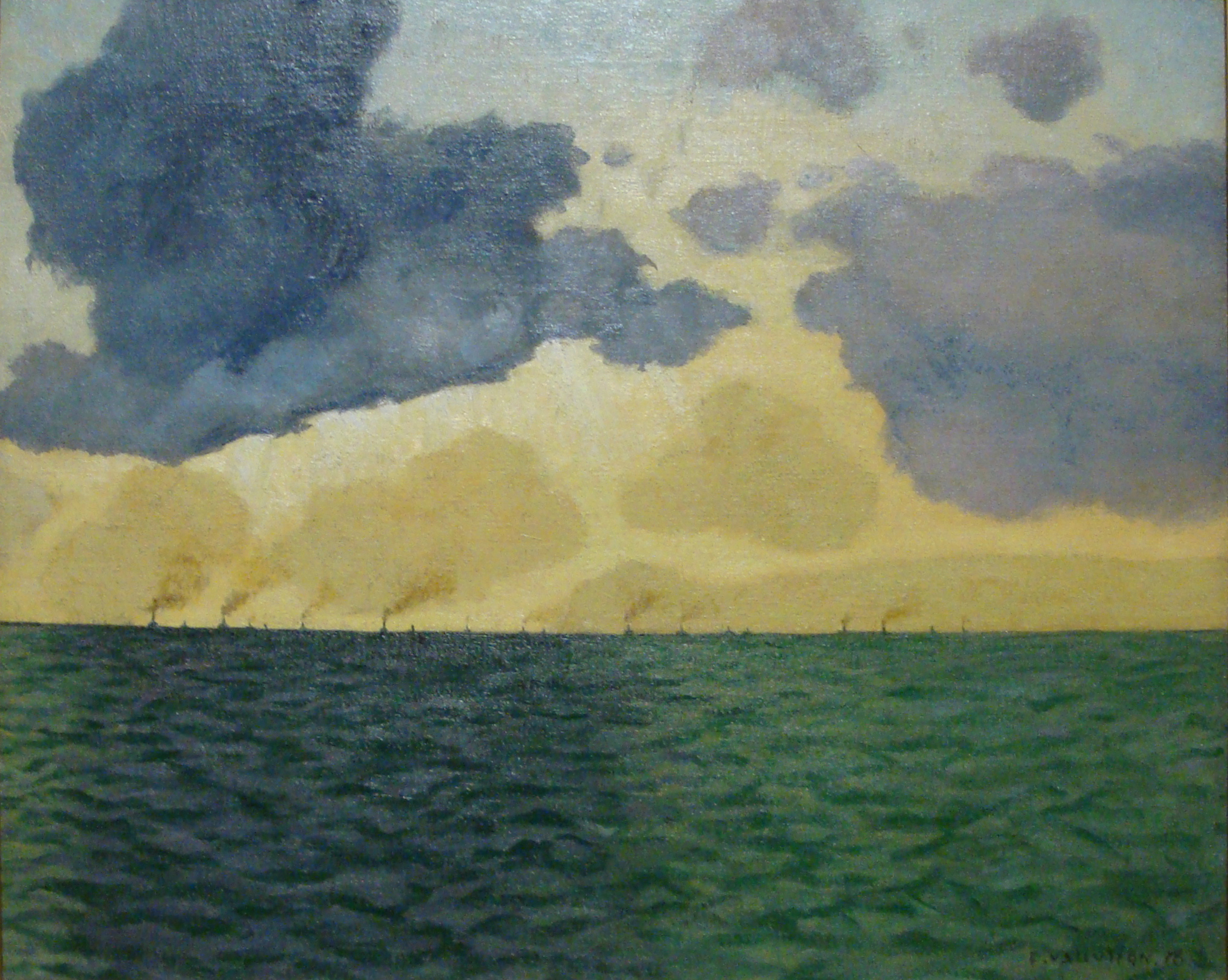
The Bay of Le Havre (1918)

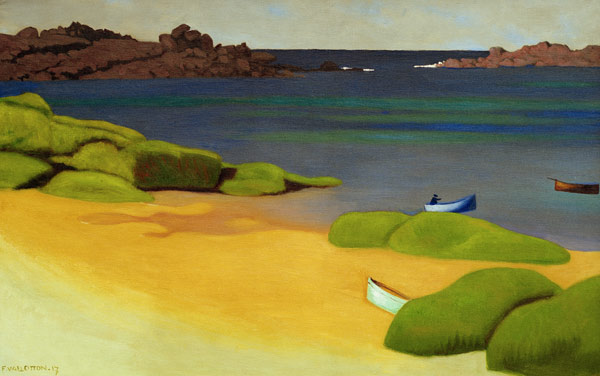
The Bay of Trégastel (1917)

=== Interiors ===
Many of Vallotton's paintings depicted interior apartment scenes, usually with men and women, sometimes hinting at scandal or adultery, sometimes simple scenes such as taking sheets out of a linen closet. The paintings often depicted open doorways or open doors leading to bedrooms. His wife, Gabrielle, appeared in many of the paintings, and the apartments resembled his own on rue des Belles-Feuilles. This theme is exemplified by his painting Haut de Forme (1887), and was most frequent in his work between 1898 and about 1904.

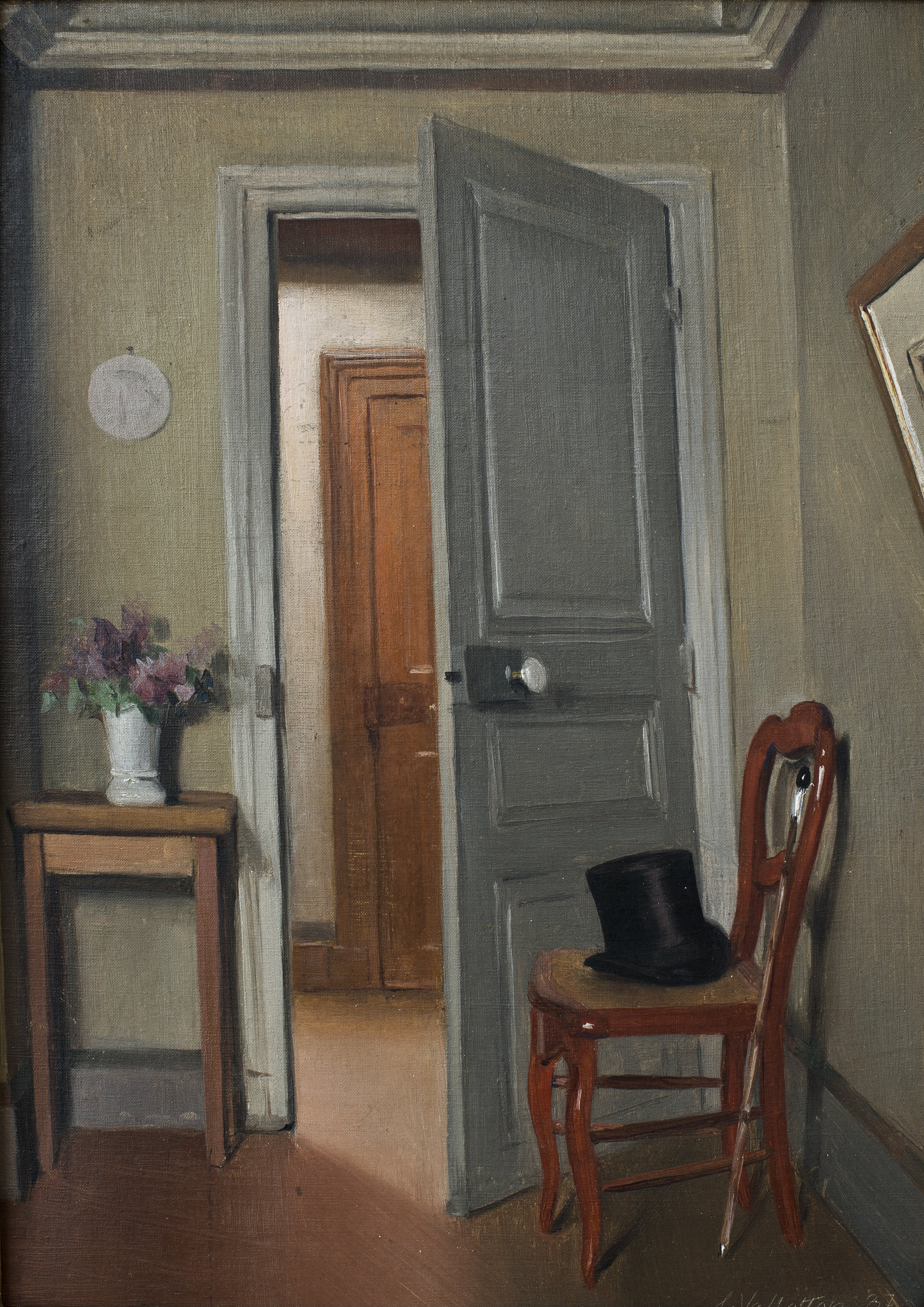
Haut de Forme (The visit), 1887, Museum of Modern Art

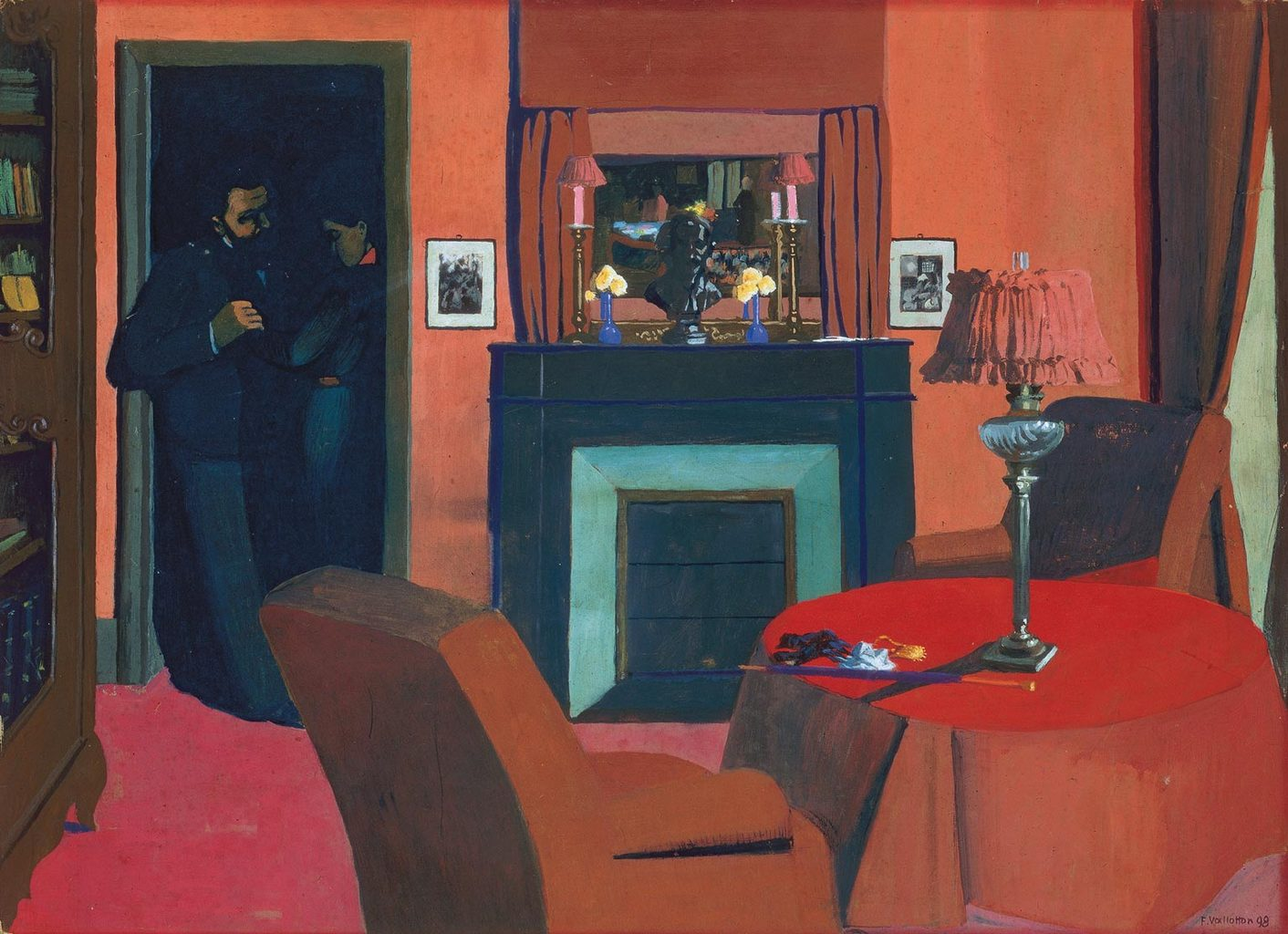
The Red Chamber (1898), tempera on board

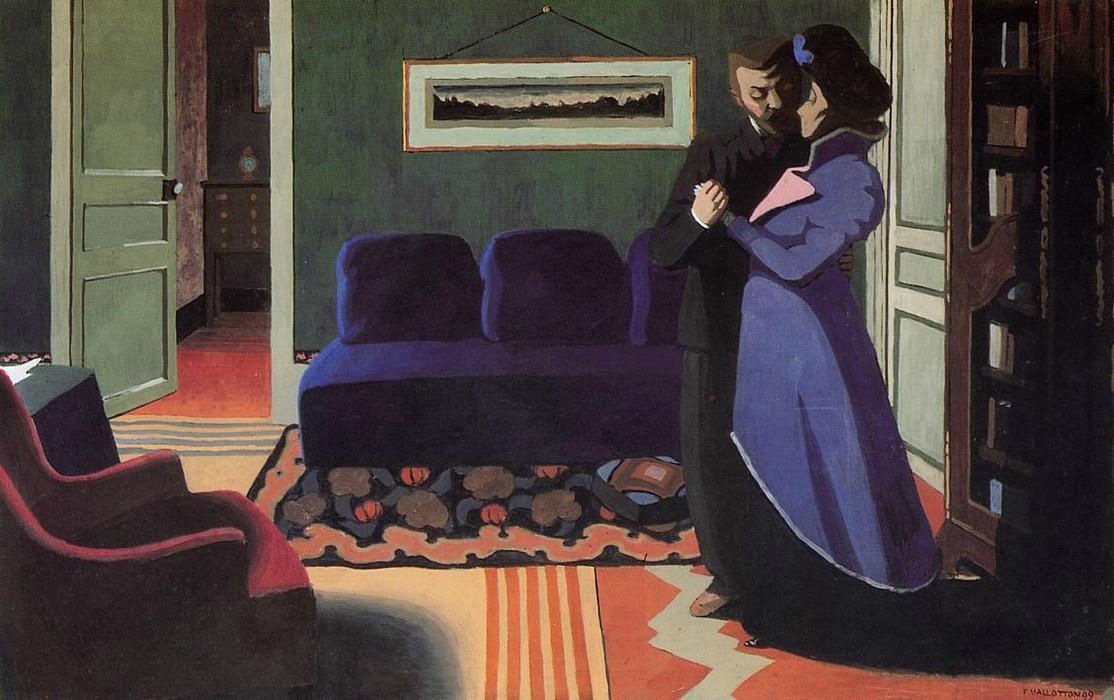
The Visit (1899), gouache on board, Kunsthaus Zürich

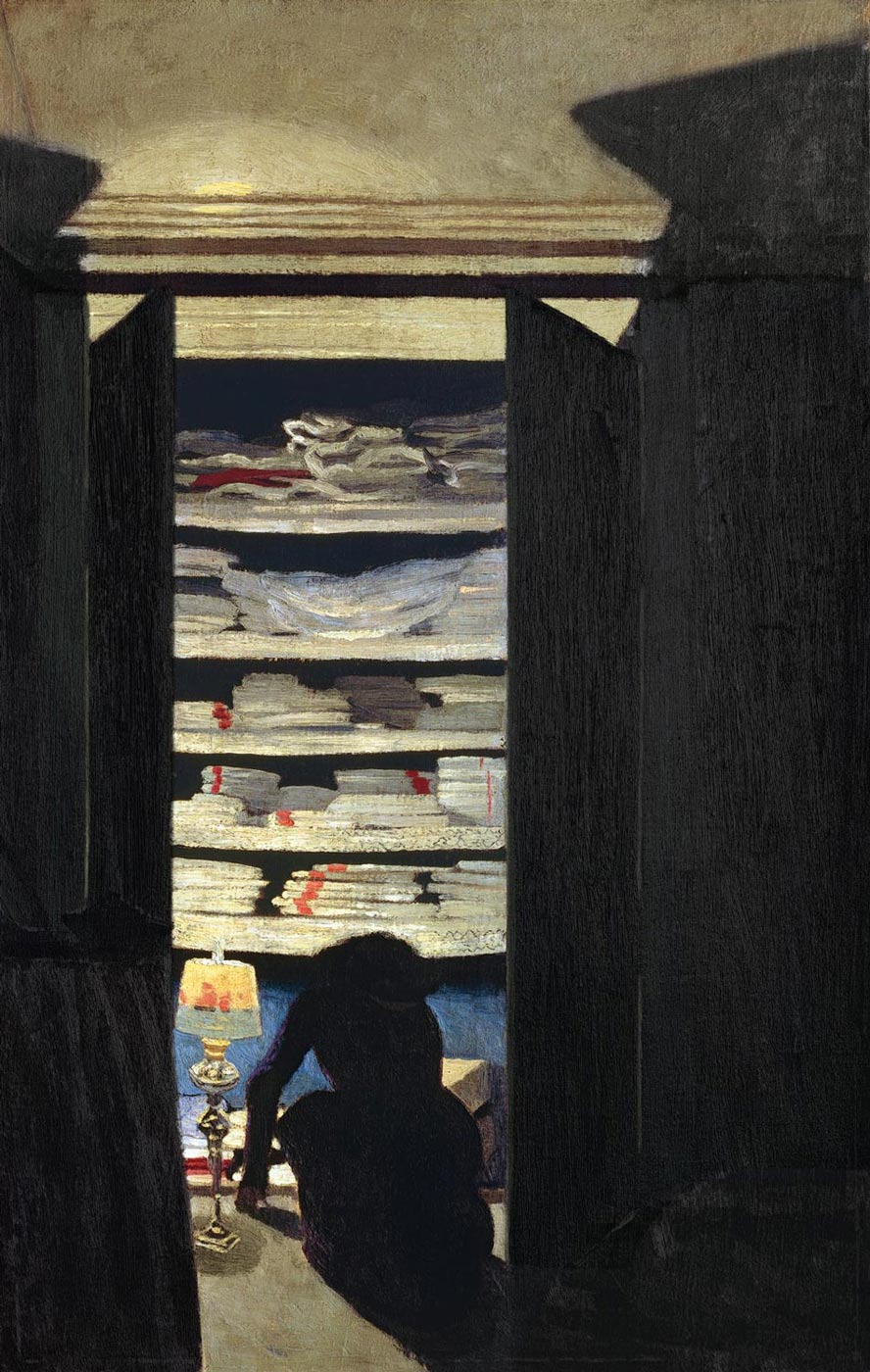
Woman searching in a wardrobe (1901)

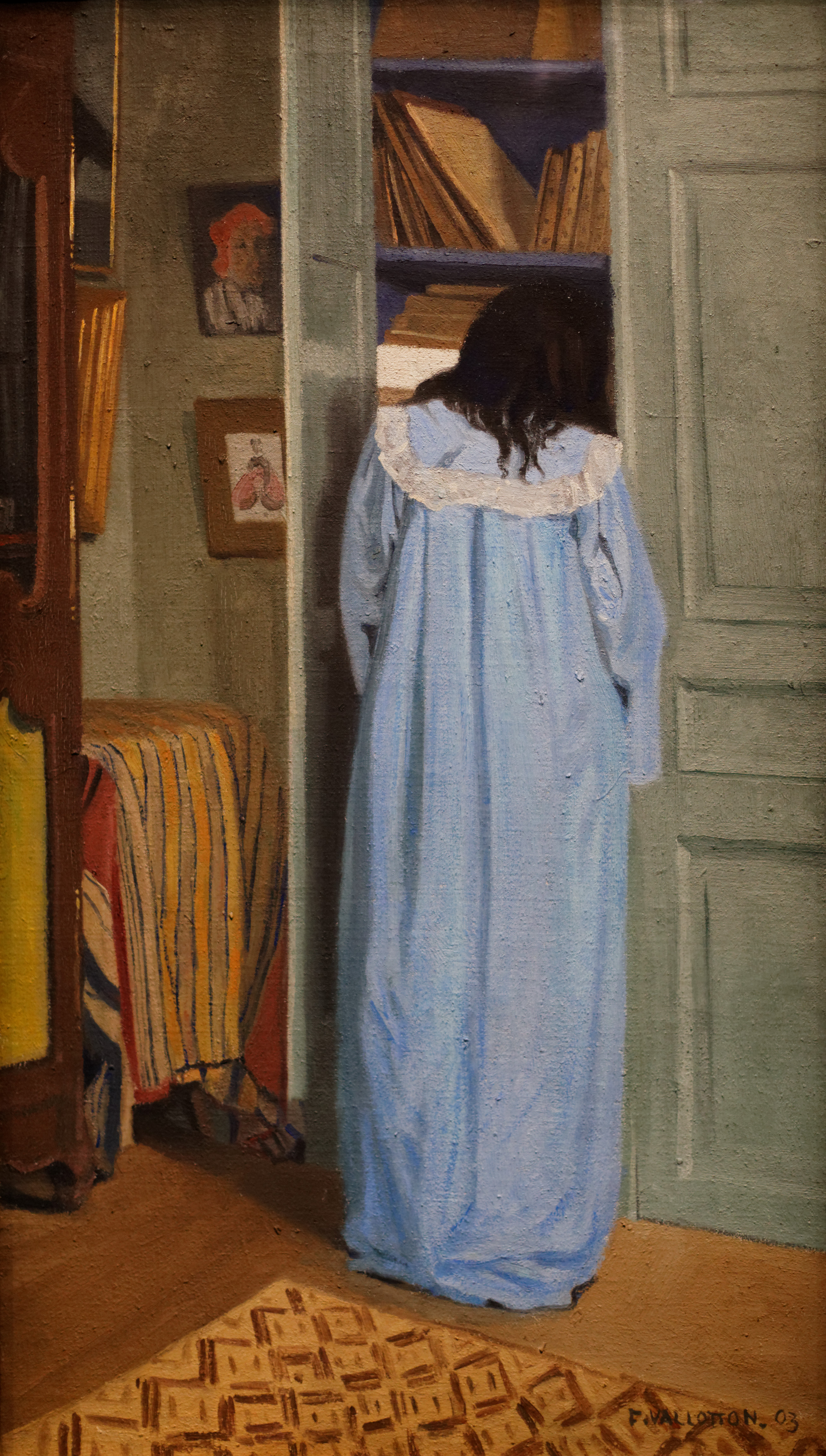
Woman in blue looking in a closet (1903)

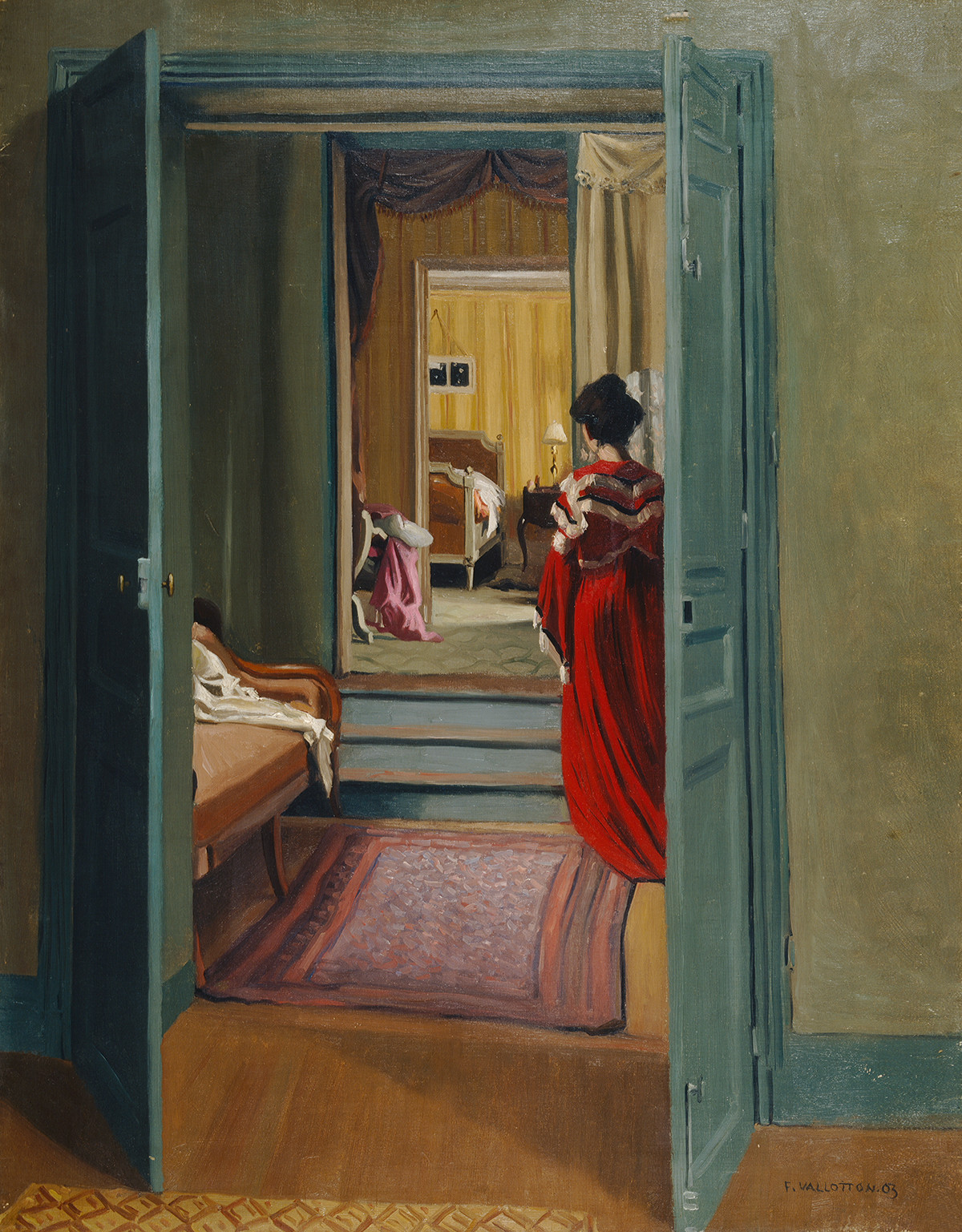
Interior with women in red robe (1904)

=== The female nude ===
The female nude was a very common subject for Vallotton; his journal records about five hundred paintings in this genre. The early nudes, when he was with the Nabis, were stylized and simplified. Later, the paintings became more detailed and realistic. The decor in the paintings was minimal. The choice of colors—particularly the use of complementary red and green—emphasizes the paleness of the model's skin. There is no effort to make the models romantic or beautiful, and they never smile.

The Mistress and the Servant (1896), oil on board, 52 x 66 cm, private collection

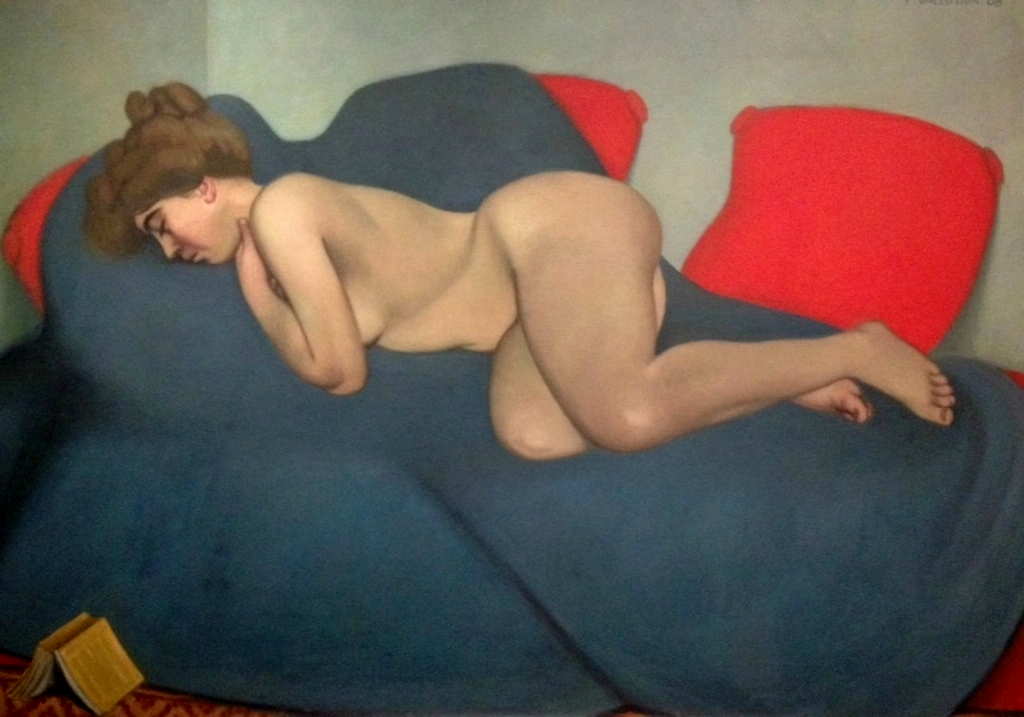
Sleep (1908)

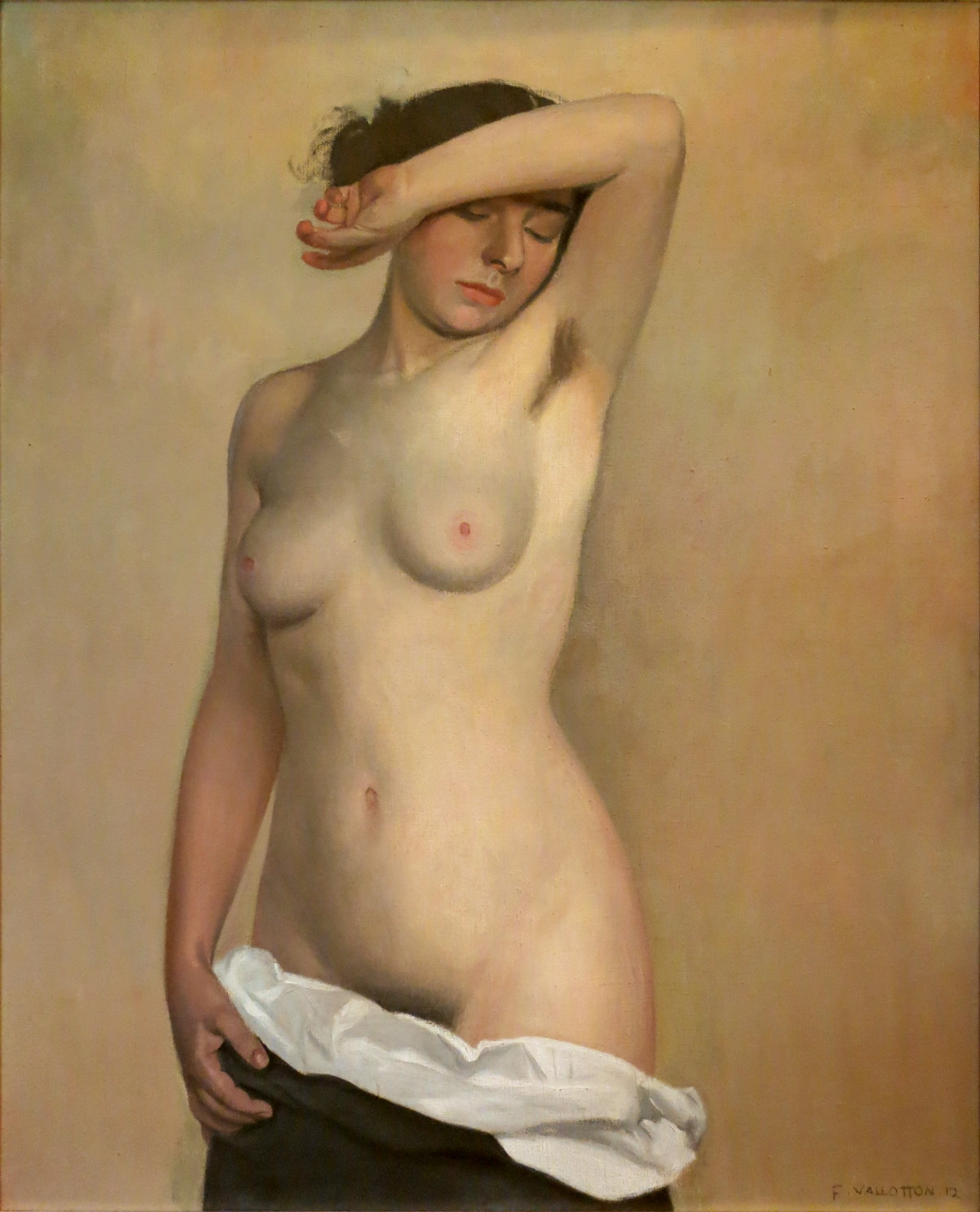
Nude, (1912), Kunstmuseum Winterthur

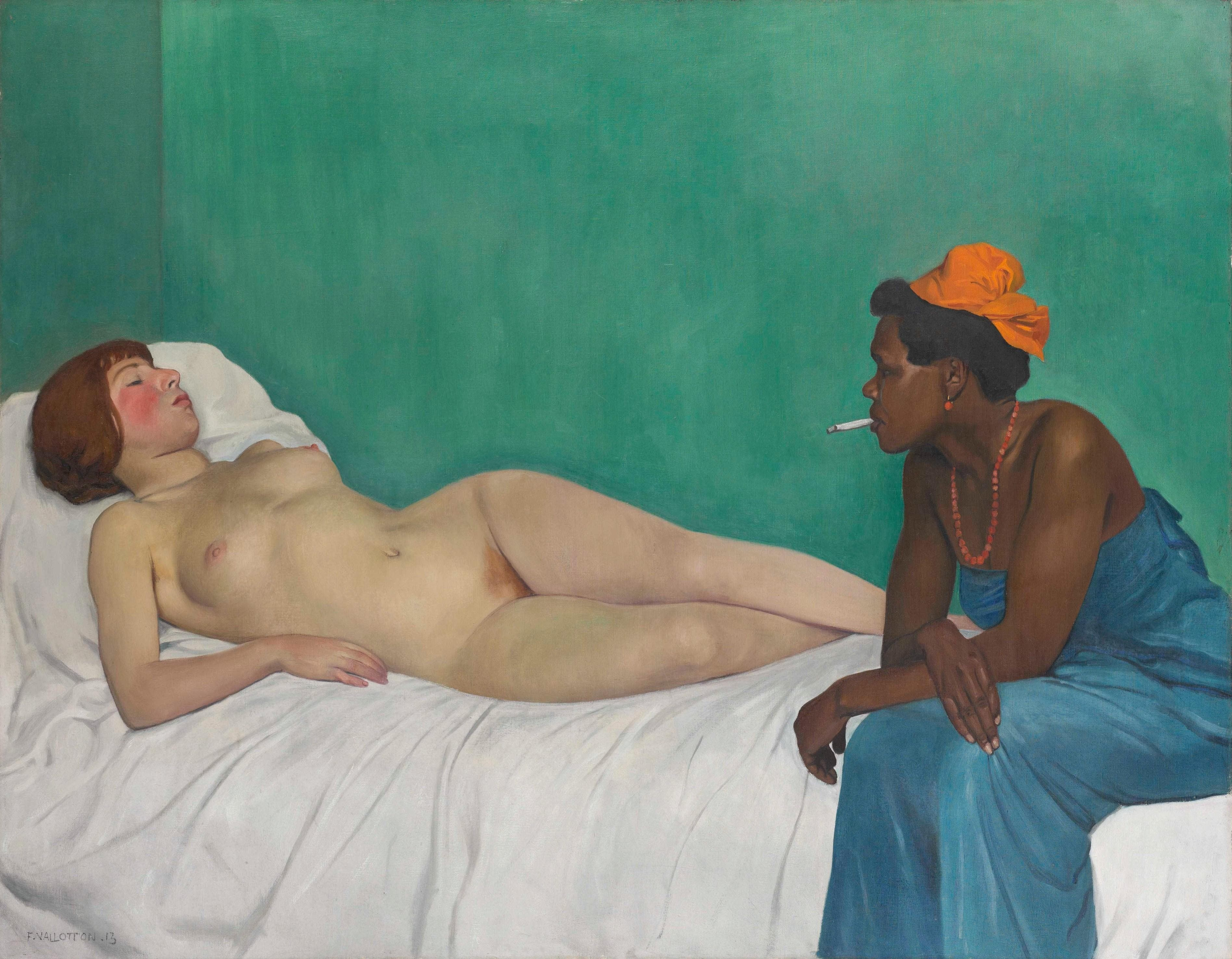
La Blanche et la Noire (1913)

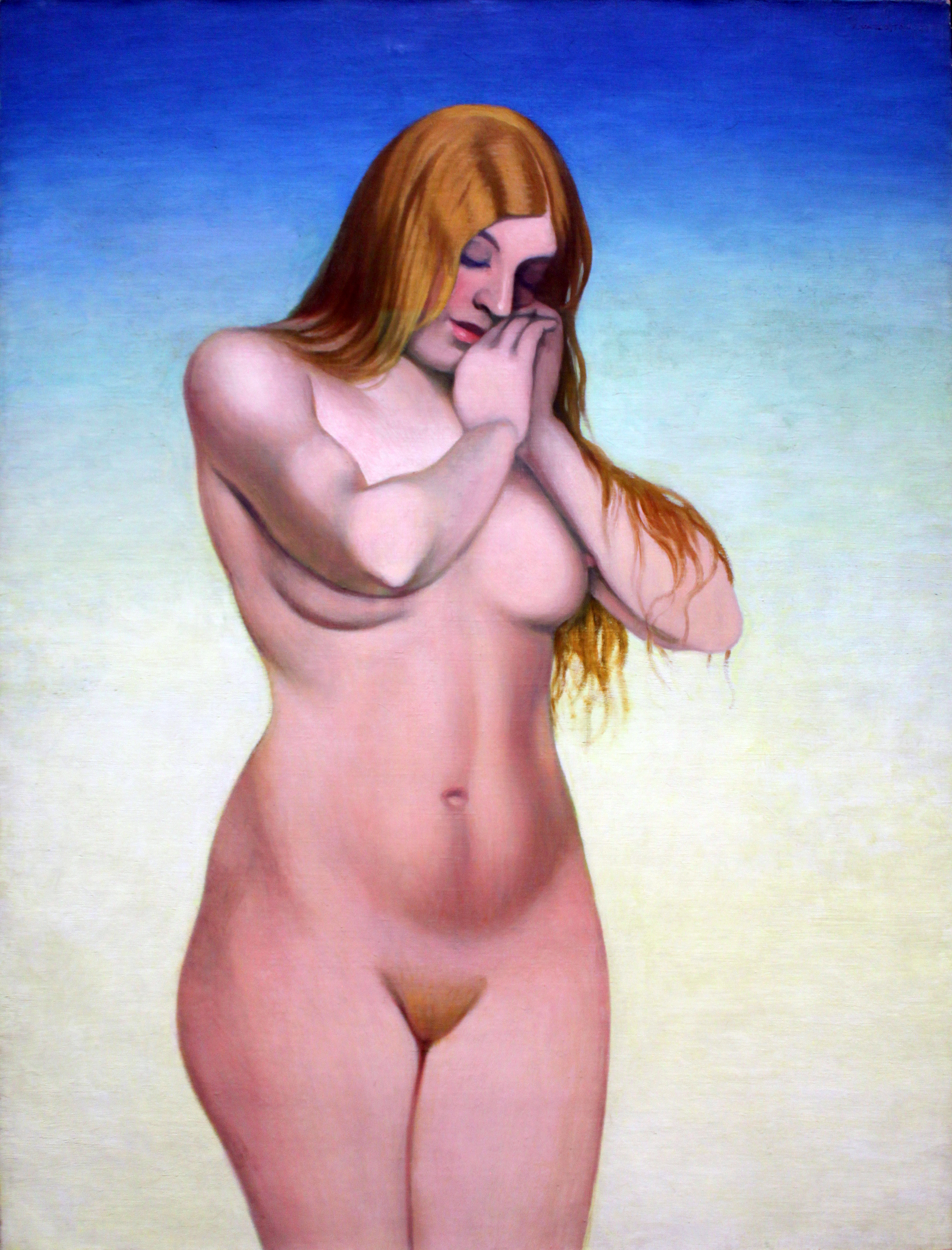
Blonde Nude (1921)

=== Encounters and conversations ===
Sympathetic to the anarchist movement in his youth, Vallotton was an intense critic of Parisian life and values of the Paris upper class in the Belle Époque. In the 1890s as a Nabi, he contributed many satirical illustrations to radical revues such as Assiette au beurre and Le Cri de Paris. His political attitudes changed somewhat in 1899 when he married Gabrielle Rodrigues-Hénriques, a member of a wealthy family, and he found himself a member of the class he was accustomed to condemn.

Despite Vallotton's new position, he continued his social criticism. He painted numerous scenes of intimate conversations between men and women, sometimes in restaurants, sometimes at the theater—often scenes suggesting seduction, rarely scenes suggesting romance or love. They expressed his satirical view of life in Paris at the time. The critic Octave Mirbeau described the figures in this particular genre of Vallotton's paintings in 1910: "[T]he figures don't just smile and cry, they speak ...they express strongly, with the most moving eloquence, when it is Monsieur Vallotton who hears them speak, their humanity and the character of their humanity." The Provincial (1909) depicts a woman in a bar seducing a provincial visitor to Paris.

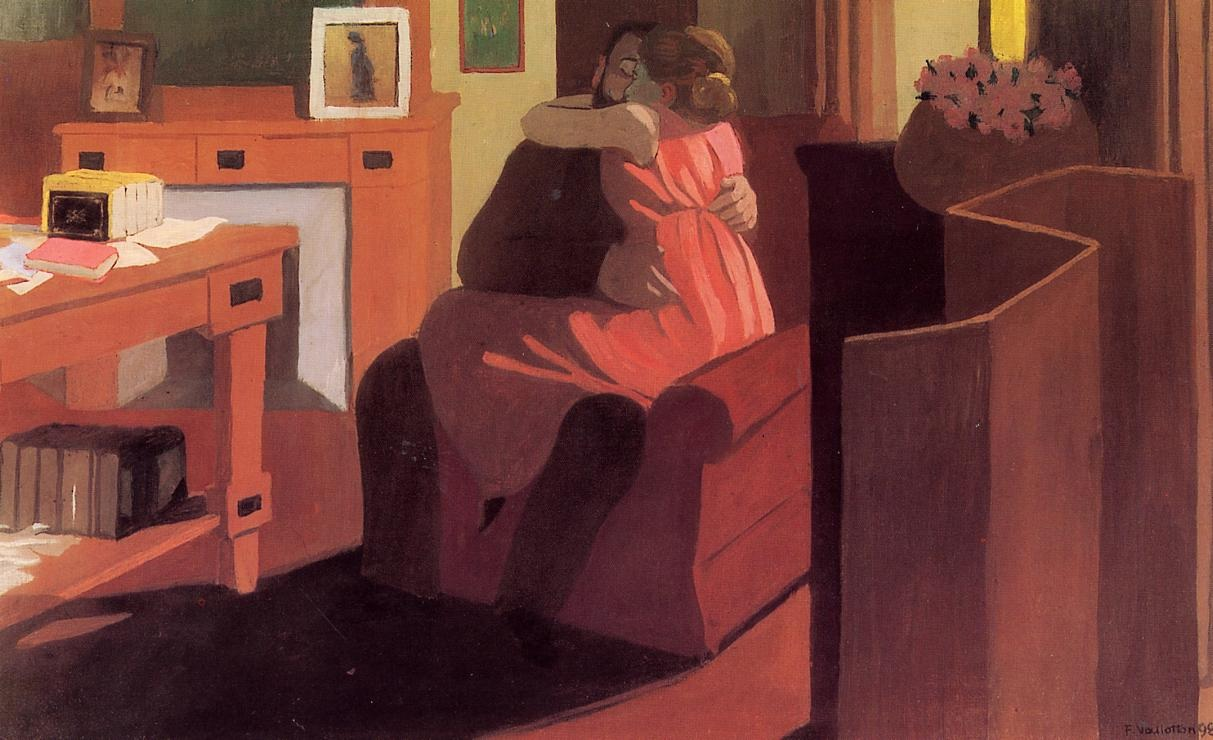
Interior with Couple and Screen (Intimacy), 1898, tempera on board

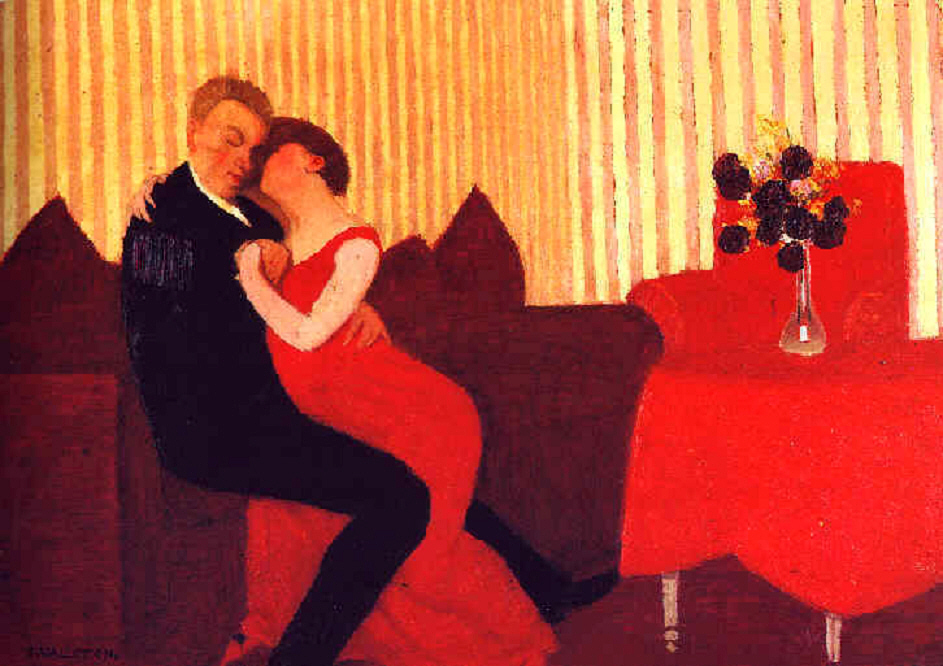
The lie (1898), oil on board, Baltimore Museum of Art

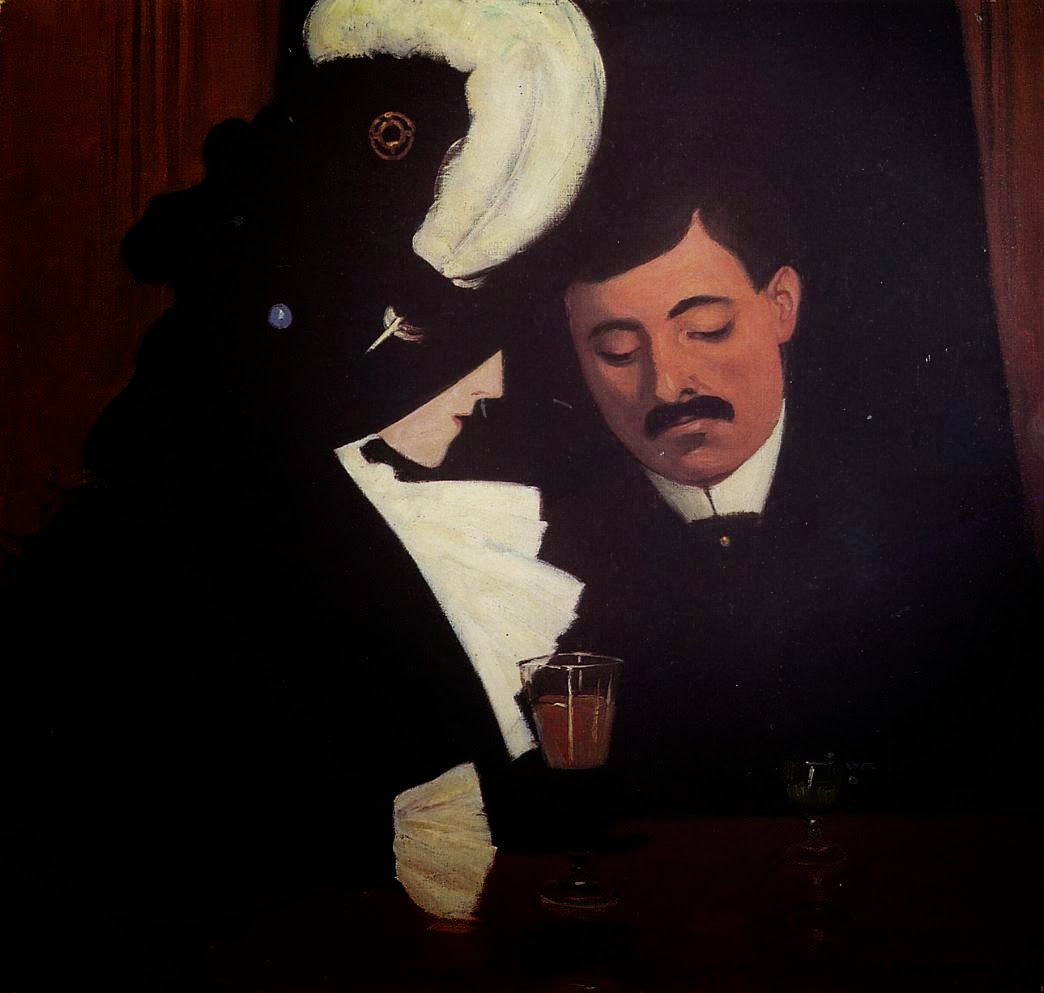
The Provincial (1909)

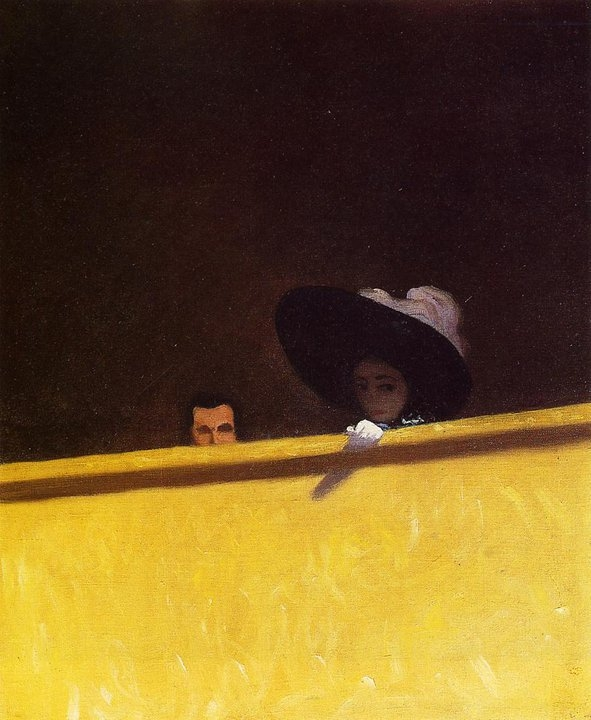
Box Seats at the Theatre, the Gentleman and the Lady (1909)

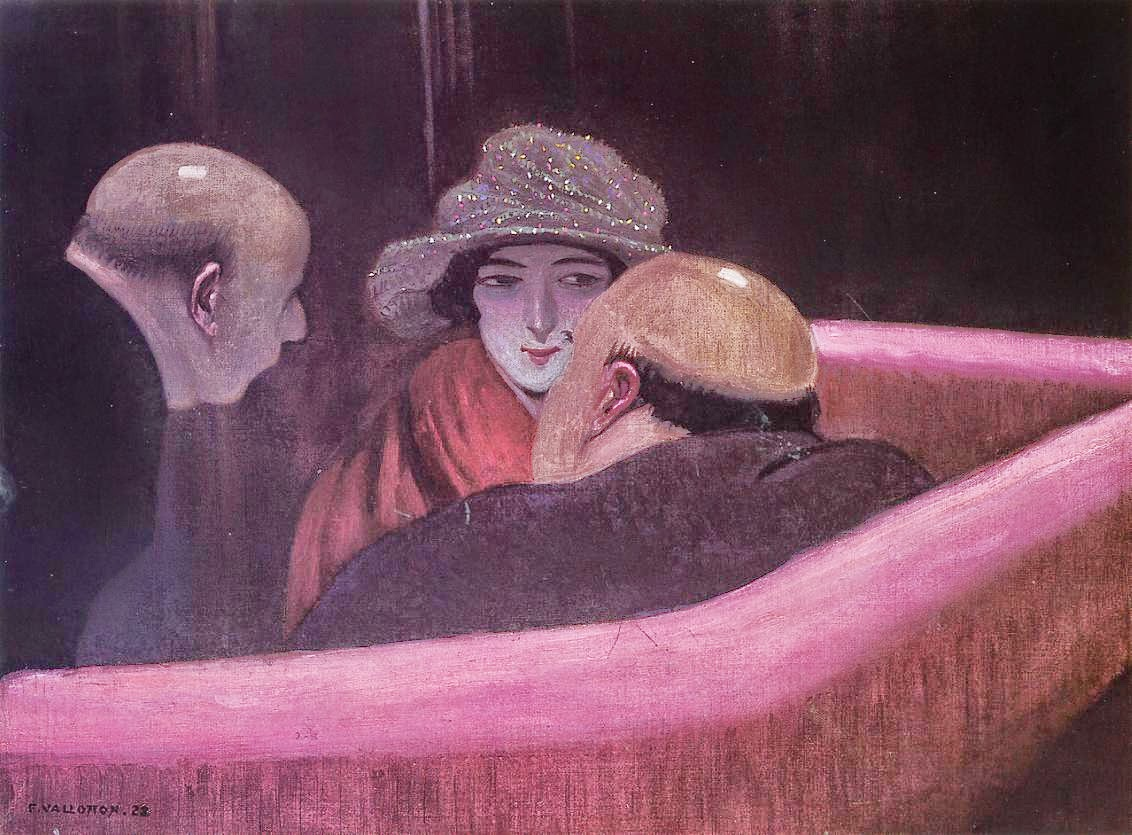
Chaste Suzanne (1922)

=== Still lifes ===
In his later years, painting in his studio in Honfleur, he concentrated particularly on still lifes, particularly flowers, fruits and vegetables, very carefully arranged and painted with extreme precision. He used very vivid colors and was especially meticulous in painting the reflections of light on the fruits, vegetables, and ceramic vases. He wrote in his journal on August 13, 1919: "More than ever the object amuses me; the perfection of an egg; the moisture on a tomato; the striking (martelage) of a hortensia flower; these are the problems for me to resolve."

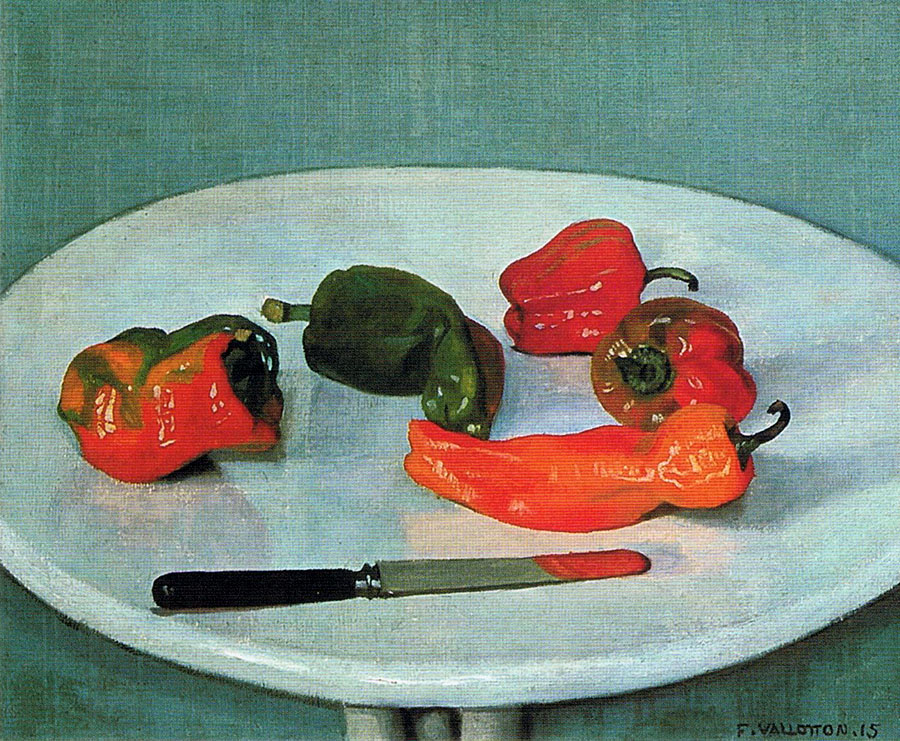
Red peppers (1915), Kunstmuseum Solothurn, Switzerland

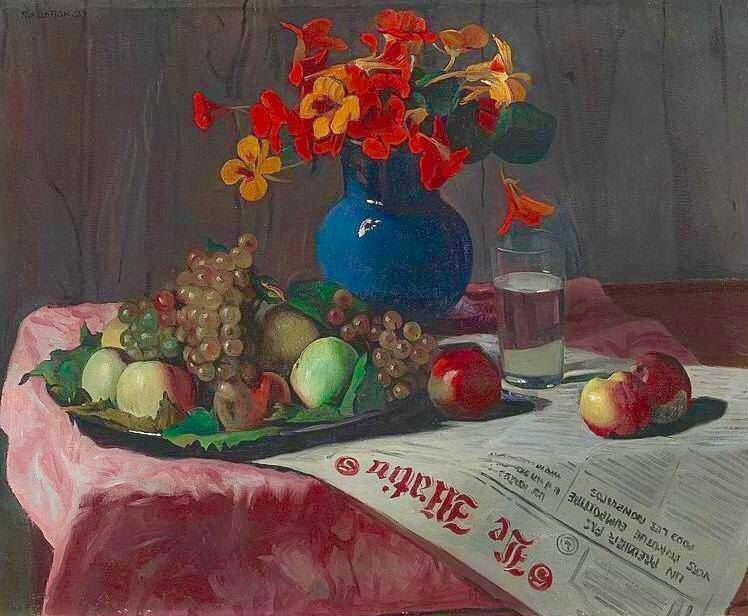
Still life with capucines (1923)

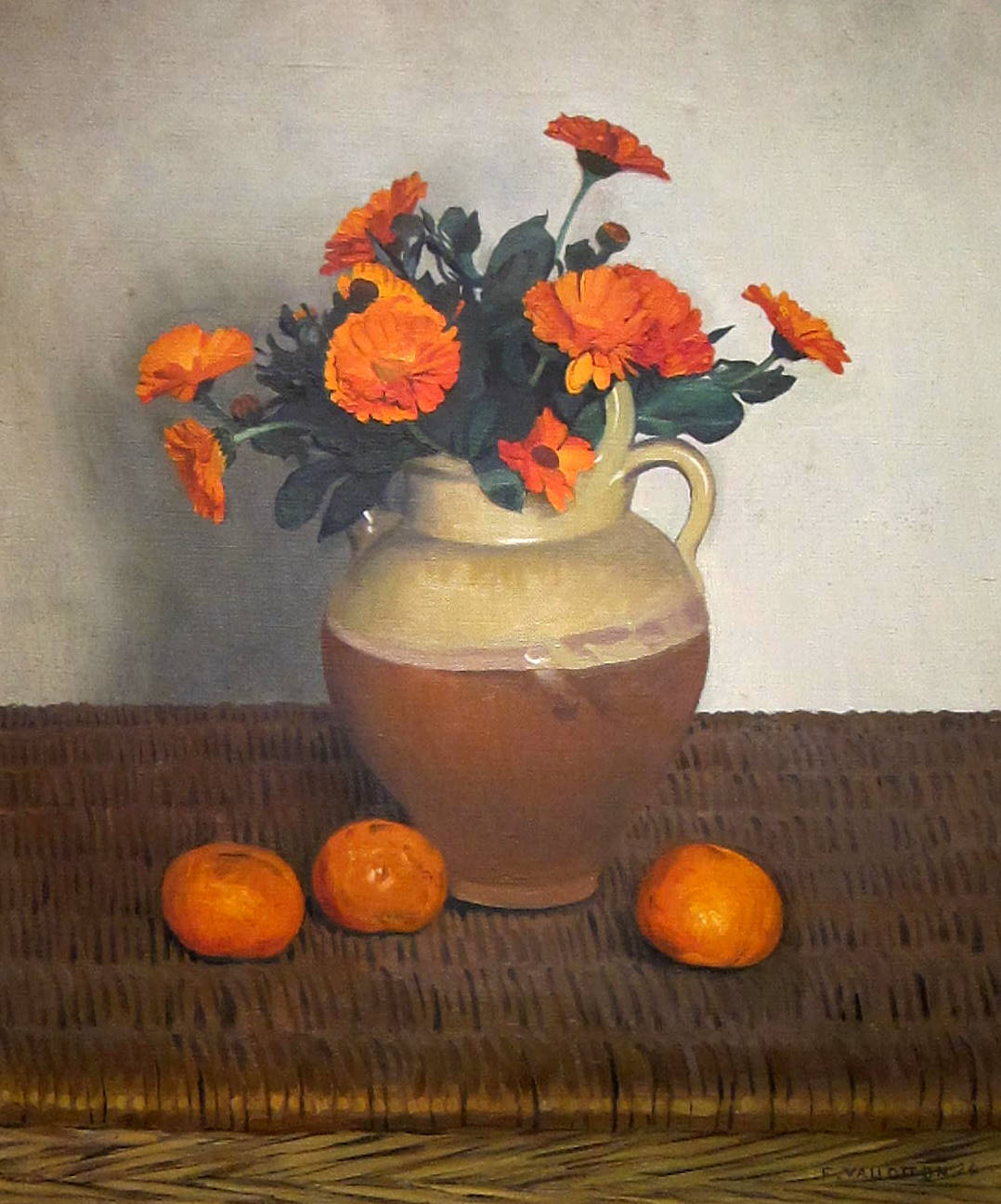
Marigolds and Tangerines (1924), oil on canvas, National Gallery of Art

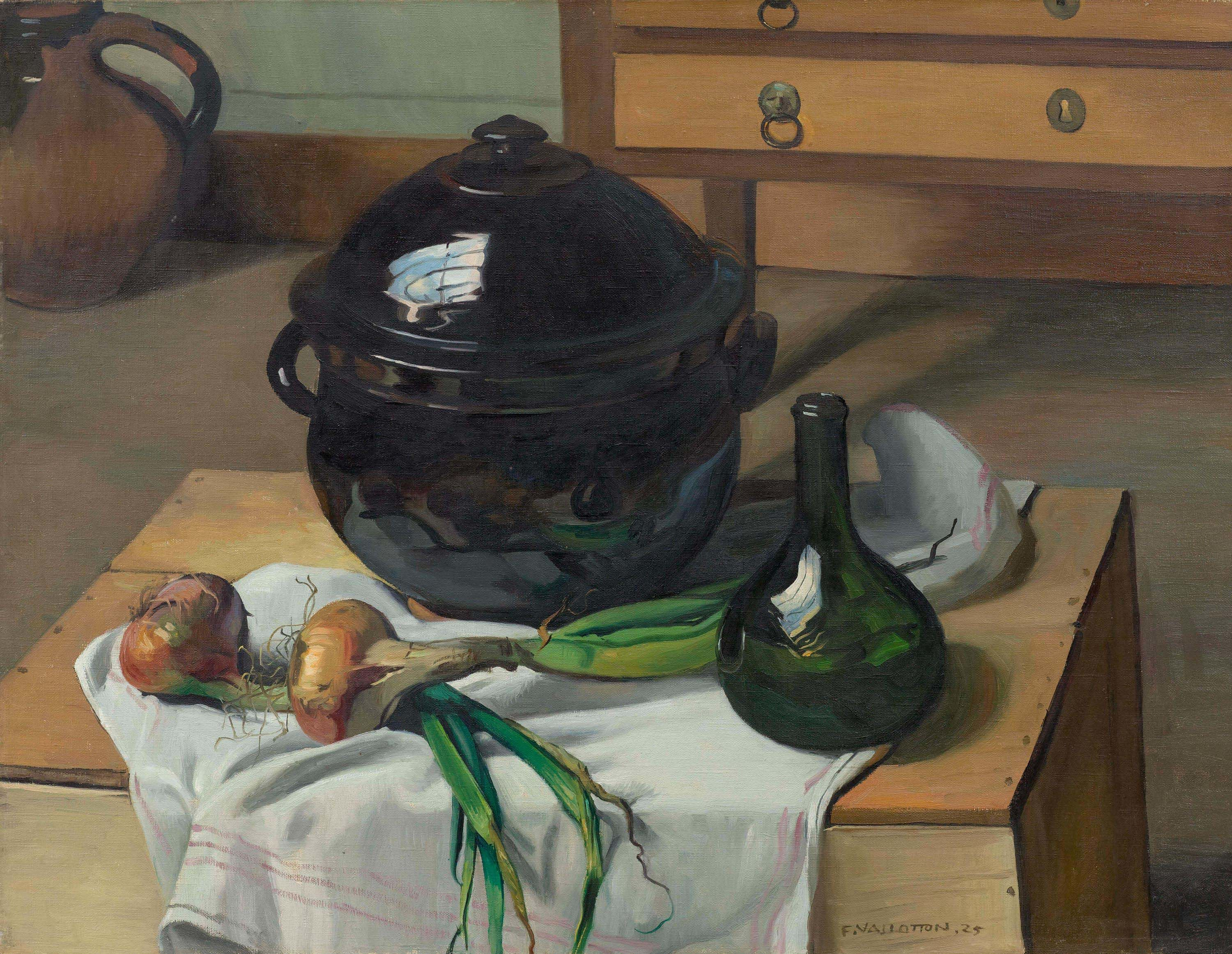
Onions and a soup tureen (1925)

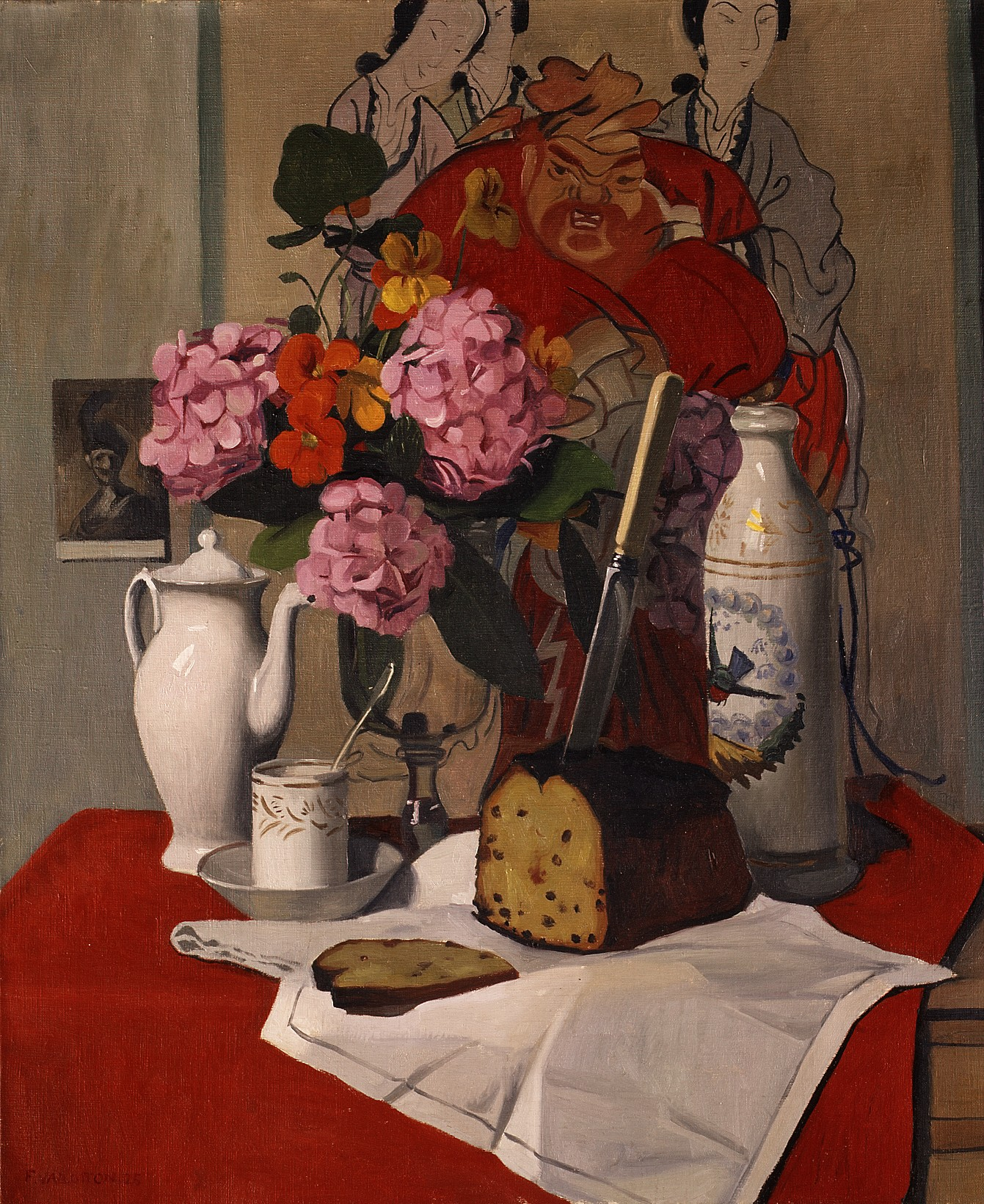
Still life with flowers (1925), Metropolitan Museum of Art

=== Portraits ===
Vallotton was recognized as a very accomplished portrait painter, and painted portraits of many of the leading figures in the arts of his time. His early work included a portrait of his fellow Nabi Édouard Vuillard. The portraits of Vallotton featured both precision and a certain cold realism. He painted the celebrated American writer and art patron Gertrude Stein the year after Pablo Picasso made his Portrait of Gertrude Stein, and depicted her as seemingly without emotion.

One of his late portraits, The Roumanian in a Red Dress (1925) caused a minor scandal. The portrait of Mado Leviseano, a Paris prostitute, shows her slumped in her chair, with a nonchalant and provocative expression. Speaking of portraits in general, Vallotton wrote: "Human bodies, like faces, have their own individual expressions, which reveal, by their angles, their folds, their wrinkles, the joy, the pain, the boredom, the worries, the appetites, and the physical decay imposed by work, and the corrosive bitterness of voluptuousness." After the death of Vallotton, the work was donated by his family to the Luxembourg Museum, the most important museum of modern art in Paris at the time. But visitors to the museum complained about the woman's posture and facial expression, and after three years it was taken down. His widow battled to have it restored to view, and the Paris museums took it back. It now is in the collection of the Musée d'Orsay.

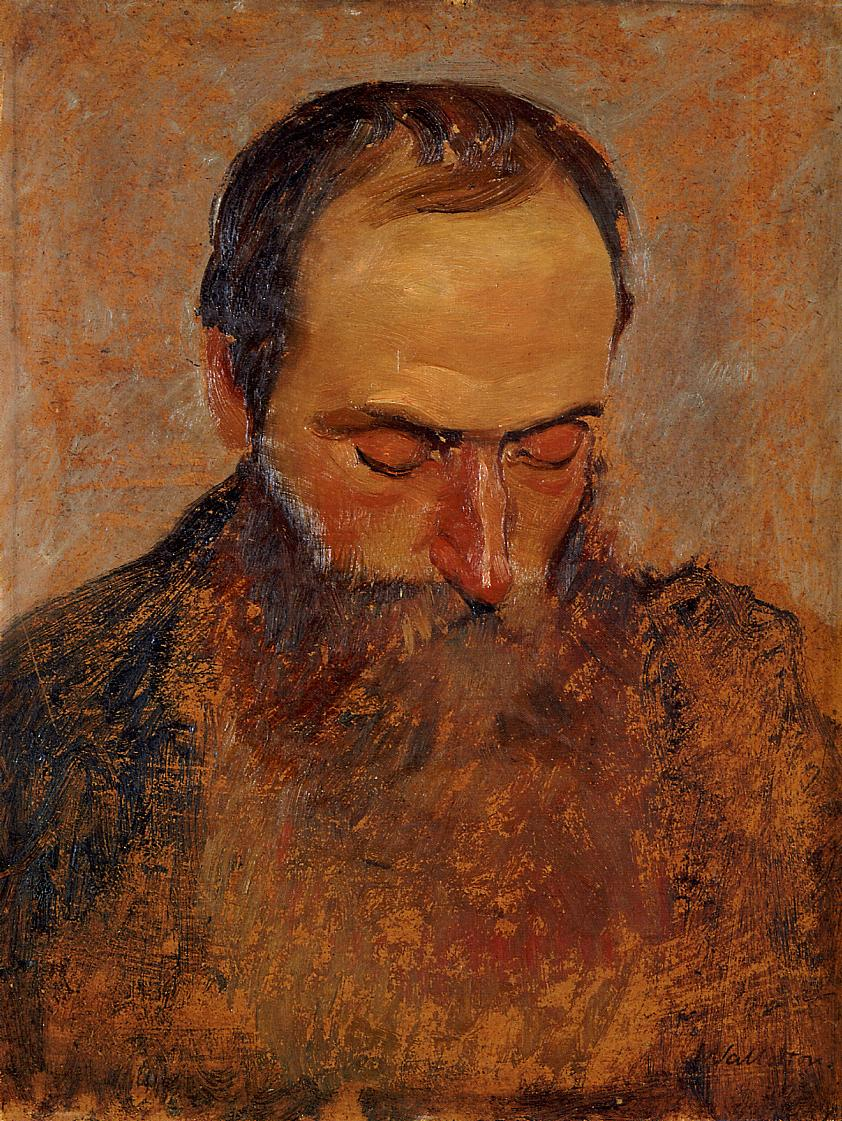
Portrait of Édouard Vuillard (1893)

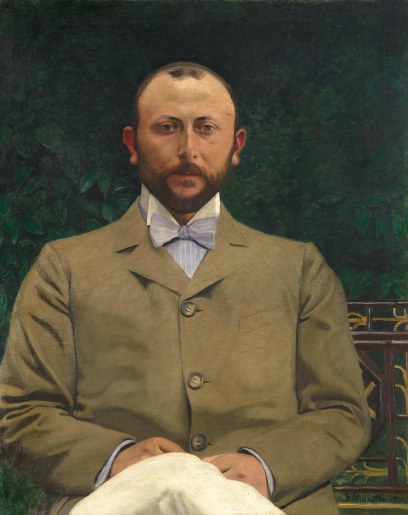
Portrait of Alexandre Natanson (1899), Musée d'Orsay

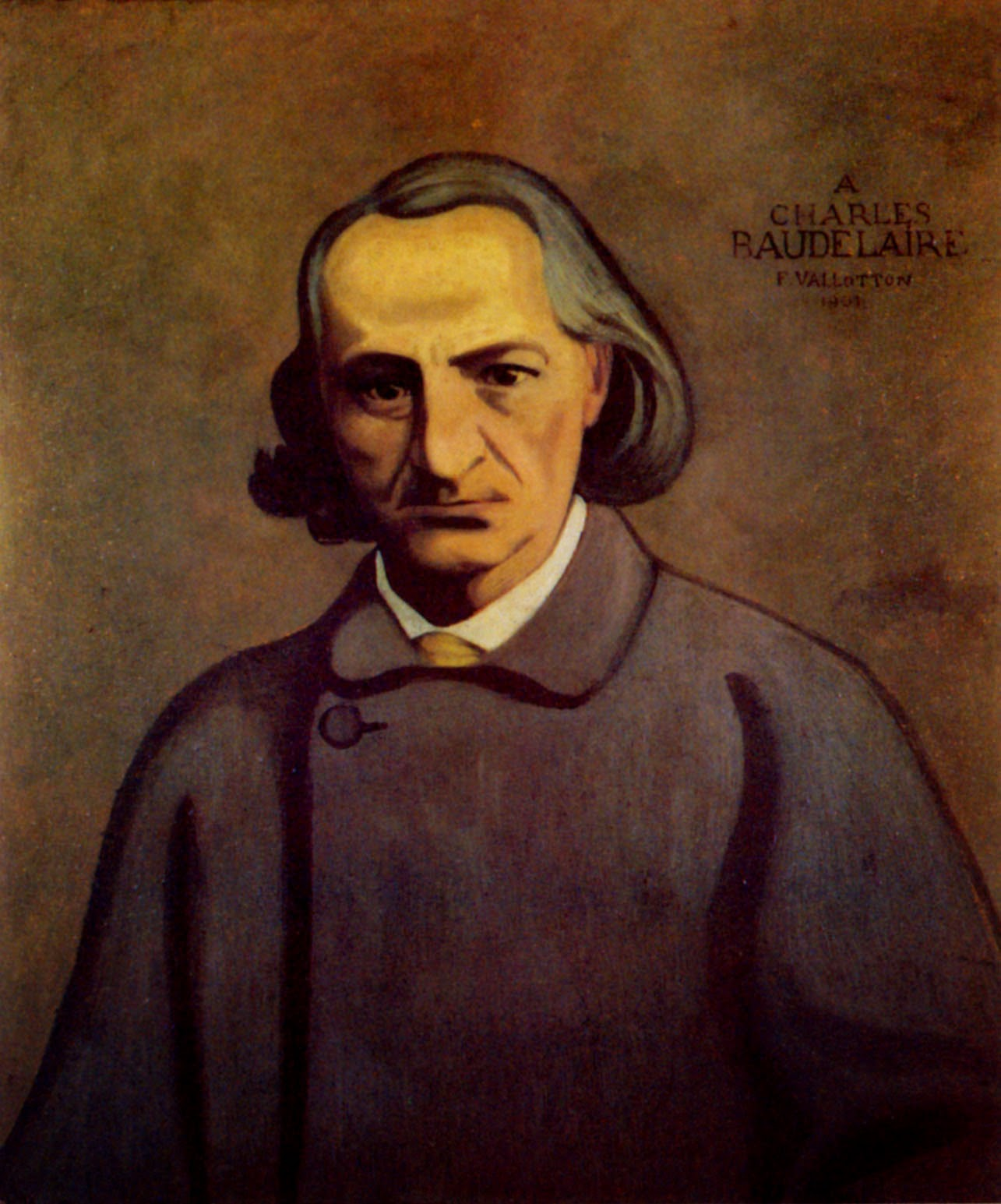
Portrait of Charles Baudelaire (1901)

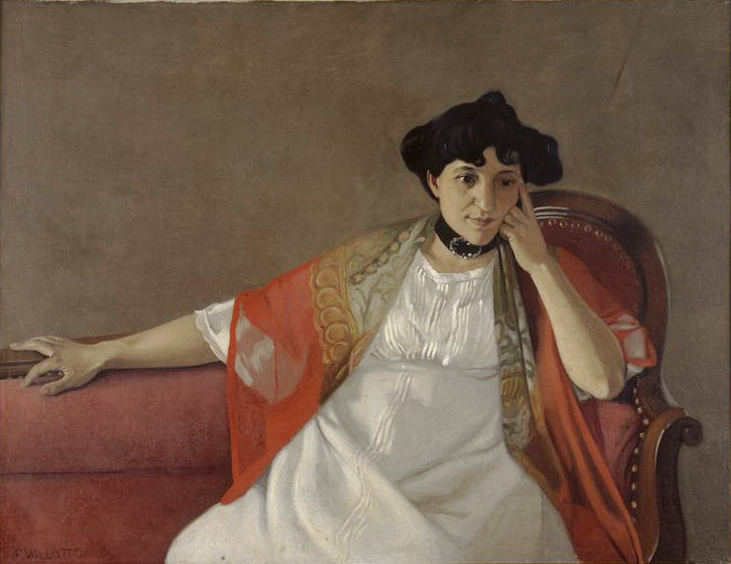
Portrait of Gabrielle Vallotton (1905), Musée des Beaux-Arts de Bordeaux

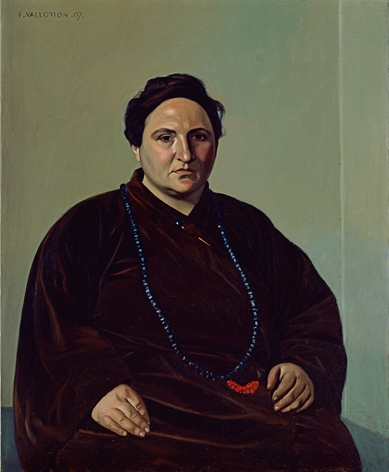
Portrait of Gertrude Stein (1907), Baltimore Museum of Art

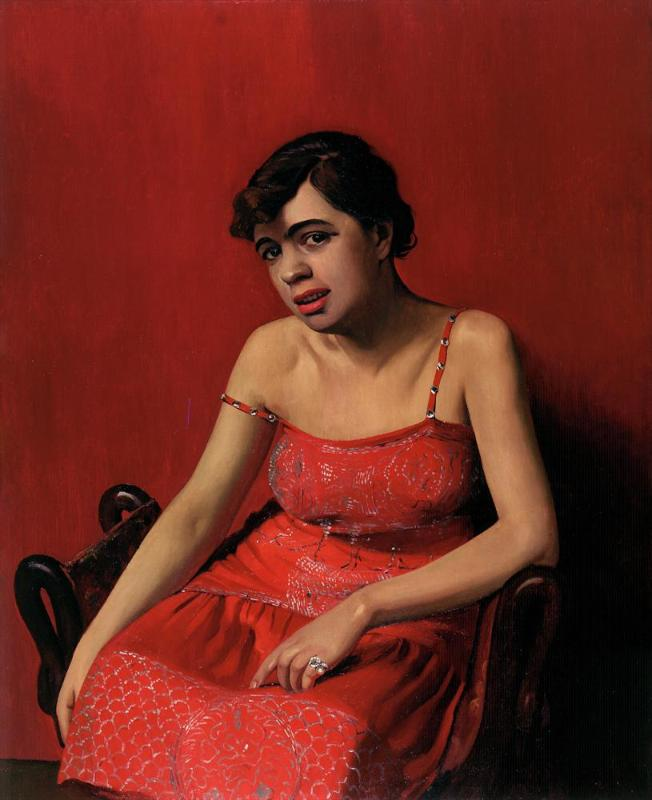
Roumanian in a Red Dress (1925), Musée d'Orsay

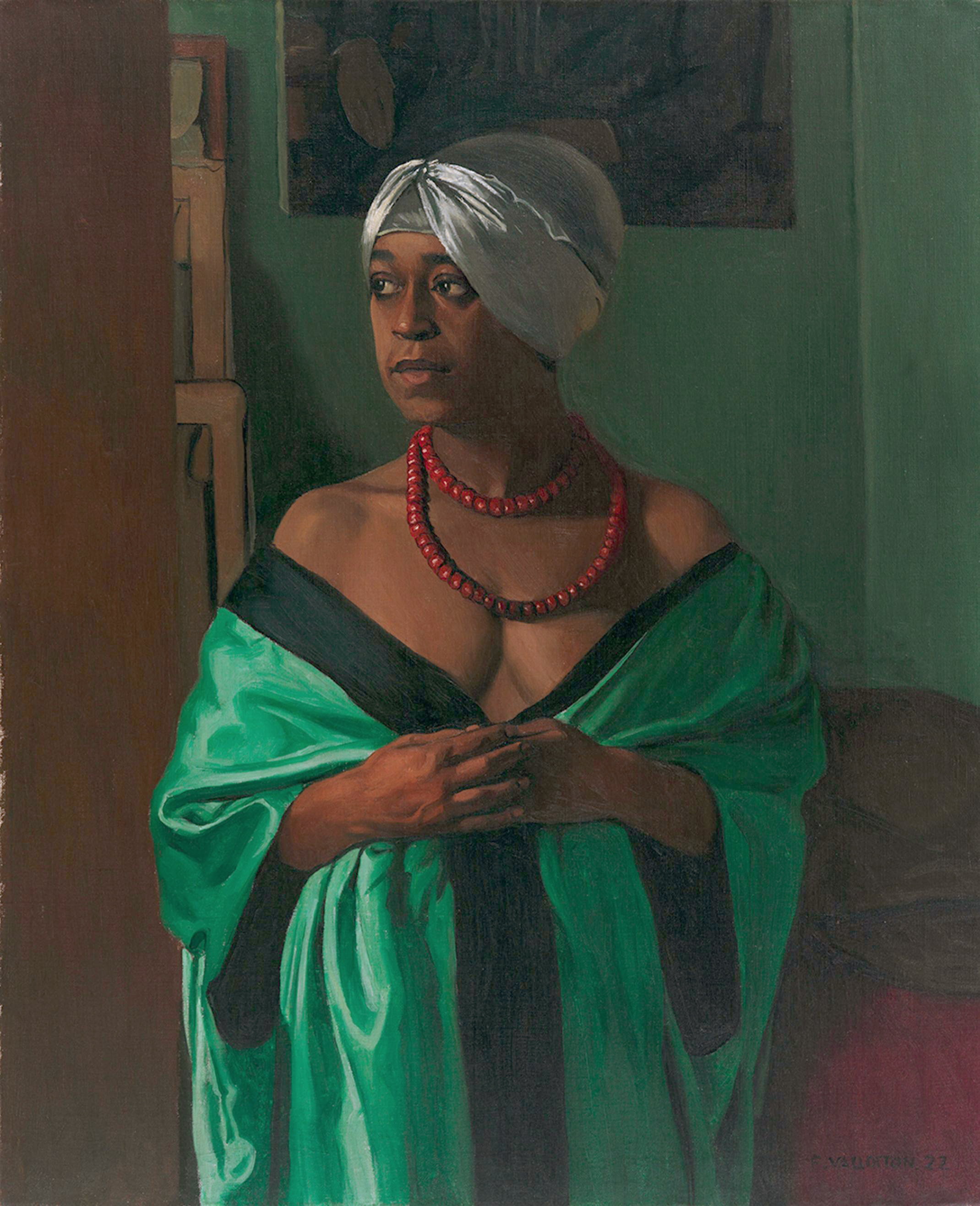
Aïcha Goblet (1922)

== Woodcuts ==
In the western world, the relief print, in the form of commercial wood engraving, had long been utilized mainly as a means to accurately reproduce drawn or painted images and, in later years, photographs. Vallotton's woodcut style was novel in its starkly reductive opposition of large masses of undifferentiated black and areas of unmodulated white. Vallotton emphasized outline and flat patterns, and generally eliminated the gradations and modeling traditionally produced by hatching. He was influenced by post-Impressionism, Symbolism, and especially by the Japanese woodcut: a large exhibition of ukiyo-e prints had been presented at the École des Beaux-Arts in 1890, and Vallotton, who was like many artists of his era an enthusiast of Japonisme, collected these prints.

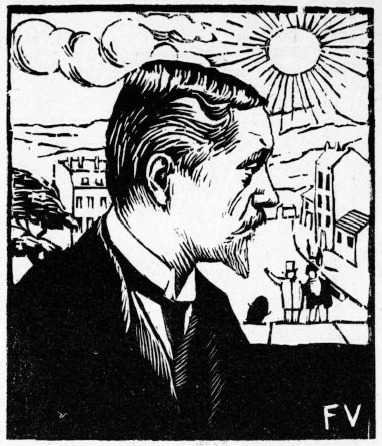
Self portrait, 1891

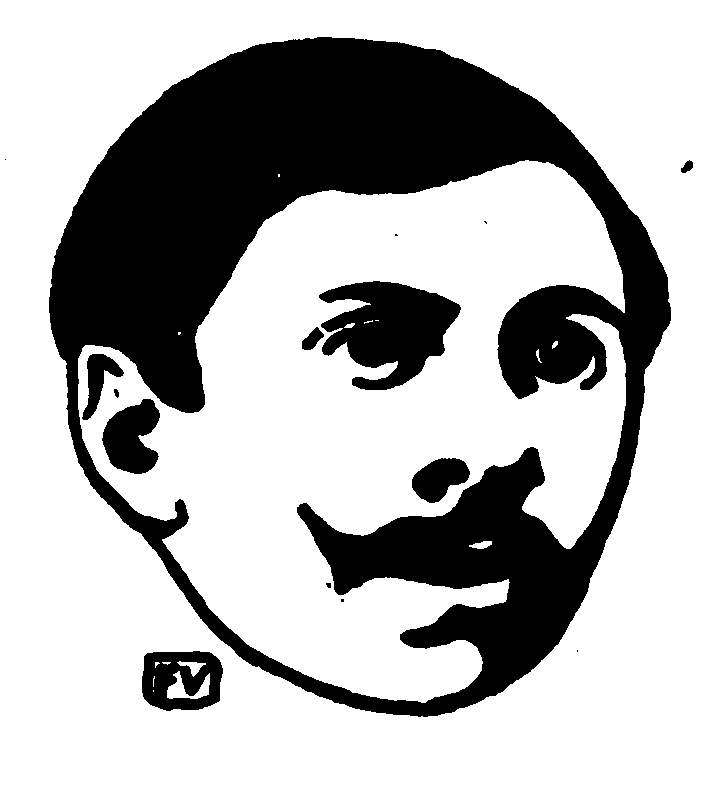
Paul Adam, 1896

Léon Blum, 1900

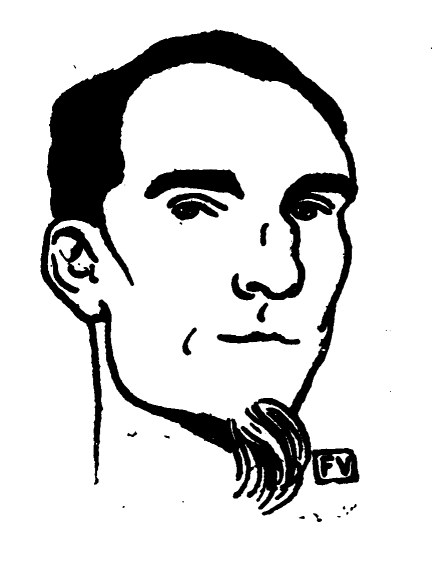
Félix Fénéon, 1898

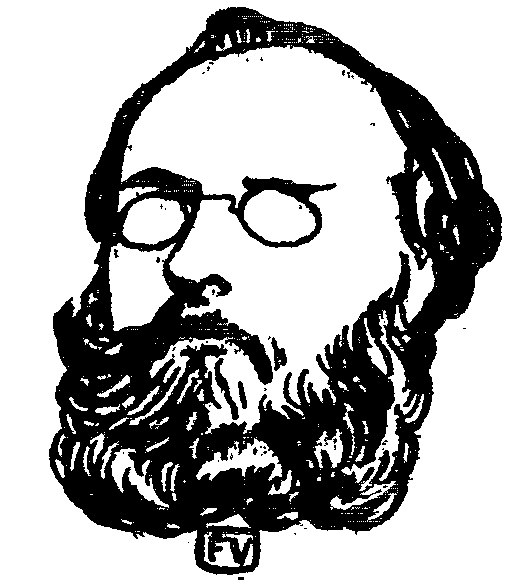
Raoul Rigault, 1897

== Collections ==
Vallotton's work in the following collections:

- Félix Vallotton in the Cleveland Museum of Art
- Félix Vallotton in the Metropolitan Museum of Art
- Félix Vallotton in the Museum of Fine Arts Boston
- Félix Vallotton in the Museum of Modern Arts
- Félix Vallotton in the National Gallery of Art
