= Red Room =

Red Room may refer to:

== Art and entertainment ==
=== Film and television ===
- Red Room (film), a 1999 Japanese horror film
- Red Rooms, a 2023 Canadian psychological thriller film, written and directed by Pascal Plante
- Black and White Lodges, from Twin Peaks, commonly referred to as "the red room"

=== Literature ===
- "The Red Room" (short story), 1894, by H. G. Wells
- The Red Room (French novel), 2001, by Nicci French
- The Red Room (Strindberg novel), 1879
- Red Room (comics), a fictional Soviet training program featured in Marvel Comics
- An area of the haunted house described in the 1977 book The Amityville Horror
- A room and a symbol in the gothic 1847 novel Jane Eyre by Charlotte Brontë
- A room for BDSM activities in the Fifty Shades trilogy

=== Music ===
- The Red Room, a 2010 mixtape by The Game
- "Red Room", a song by Loathe from I Let It In and It Took Everything
- "Red Room", a 2024 song by 6arelyhuman
- "Red Room" (song), 2019, by American rapper Offset
- Red Room (tour), a 2017-2018 concert tour by the Korean girl group Red Velvet

=== Paintings ===
- The Dessert: Harmony in Red (The Red Room), 1908, by Henri Matisse
- The Red Room, 1898, by Félix Vallotton

=== Other uses in arts and entertainment ===
- The Red Room Theatre Company, a London-based theatre company
- "Red Room Curse", a late 1990s Japanese flash animation and rumor

== Other uses ==
- Red Room (White House), a state parlor in the White House
- An urban legend referring to a hidden service or website on the dark web, depicting the live torture and murder of individuals

== See also ==
- Red chamber (disambiguation)
- Red hall (disambiguation)
- Redrum (disambiguation)
