= William G. Allman =

American historian (born 1952)

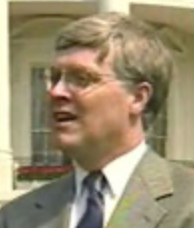

7th White House Curator
- In office August 1, 2002 – June 2017
- President: George W. Bush; Barack Obama; Donald Trump
- Preceded by: Betty C. Monkman
- Succeeded by: Lydia Tederick

Personal details
- Born: 1952 (age 73–74) Bethesda, Maryland, U.S.
- Education: University of Maryland (BA); The George Washington University (MA)

William G. "Bill" Allman (born 1952) is an American historian who was the seventh White House curator, first appointed by President George W. Bush. He served as both the head of the White House Office of the Curator and as a spokesperson for the office's initiatives.

== Early life ==
Allman was born in 1952, in Bethesda, Maryland. He received a Bachelor of Arts in History from the University of Maryland and a Master of Arts in American Studies with Museum Concentration from George Washington University.

== White House ==
Allman joined the White House as a Curatorial Assistant and was promoted to Assistant Curator in 1976. He contributed to the 1999 edition of Official White House China by Margaret Brown Klapthor. Allman was appointed White House Curator on August 1, 2002. He has also written for the journal White House History and has given lectures on the White House collection.
