= Rex Scouten =

White House chief usher and curator(1924–2013)

Rex W. Scouten
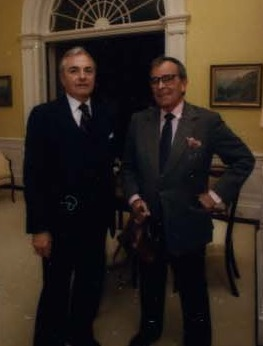
- Left, with interior designer Ted Graber in 1989

White House Curator
- In office 1986–1997
- President: Ronald Reagan; George H. W. Bush; Bill Clinton
- Preceded by: Clement Ellis Conger
- Succeeded by: Betty C. Monkman

7th White House Chief Usher
- In office 1969–1986
- President: Richard Nixon; Gerald Ford; Jimmy Carter; Ronald Reagan
- Preceded by: James B. West
- Succeeded by: Gary J. Walters

Personal details
- Born: September 16, 1924; Snover, Michigan, U.S.
- Died: February 20, 2013 (aged 88); Fairfax, Virginia, U.S.

Rex Wayne Scouten (September 16, 1924 – February 20, 2013) was the White House Chief Usher from 1969 to 1986, and White House Curator from 1986 to 1997.

Born in Snover, Michigan, Scouten served in the United States Army during World War II. He graduated from Michigan State University. From 1949 to 1960, he served in the United States Secret Service. As such he served as Secret Service protection for Vice President Nixon from 1953 through 1957, and then worked at the White House. From 1960 to 1969, he was an assistant White House usher. Scouten was the White House Chief Usher from March 1969 to January 1986, and the White House Curator from 1986 to 1997.

He died in Fairfax, Virginia, on February 20, 2013, survived by his wife, Dorothy (married 1947), and two daughters.
