= Green chamber =

Green chamber may refer to:

- An informal term for lower houses whose decor has been modelled on House of Commons of the United Kingdom (more properly the chamber where it meets), including:
  - House of Commons of Canada
  - Australian House of Representatives
  - Legislative Assembly of Quebec (also nicknamed "green hall")
- One of several organizations styling themselves as green chambers of commerce, including:
  - United States Green Chamber of Commerce

== See also ==
- Green room (disambiguation)
- Red chamber (disambiguation)
