= Green room (disambiguation) =

A green room is an off-stage space or facility for accommodating guests preparing for public appearances.

Green room may also refer to:

== Venues ==
- Green Room (White House), a state parlor in the White House, home of the president of the United States
- Green Room Club, a London-based club

== Entertainment ==
- The Green Room (film), a 1978 French film
- Green Room Awards, arts awards in Melbourne
- The Green Room with Paul Provenza, a talk show on Showtime
- Green Room (film), a 2015 American horror thriller film
- Julie's Greenroom, a 2017 Netflix series starring Julie Andrews
- Green Room Magazine, a theatrical weekly produced by Hugh D. McIntosh
- Inside the Green Room, a podcast hosted by basketball player Danny Green

== Music ==
- The Green Room (recording studio), a recording studio in Huntington Beach, California
- The Green Room (DJ Shaky Bonez album)
- The Green Room (Vivian Green album)
- The 97X Green Room, an annual series of compilation albums of live music recorded for WSUN-FM's Green Room series
- The Nokia Green Room, a television show that aired on the Channel 4 in the United Kingdom
- "Green Room", a song by Ken Carson from his 2023 album A Great Chaos

== See also ==
- Green chamber (disambiguation)
- Green Hall
