= Edward Vason Jones =

American architect (1909–1980)

The Edward Vason Jones Memorial Hall, designed by Vason Jones, at the United States Department of State.

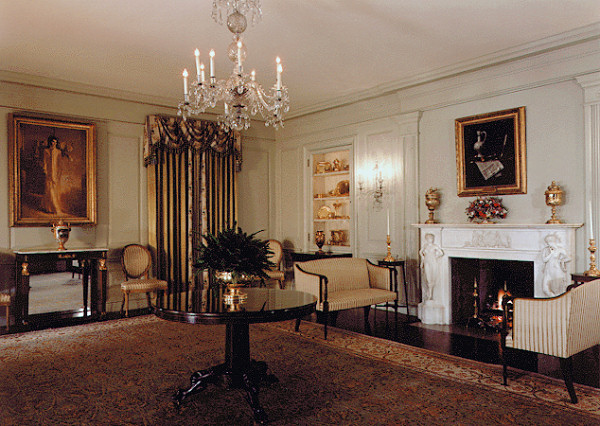
The White House Vermeil Room in 1990, before redecoration in 1991. The design shown here was done by Clement Conger and Vason Jones.

Edward Vason Jones (August 3, 1909 – October 1, 1980), a neoclassical architect and member of the Georgia School of Classicism, began his career in 1936 with the design and construction of the Gillionville Plantation near his hometown of Albany, Georgia. The project impressed Hal Hentz of the well-known Atlanta firm of Hentz, Reid, and Adler so much that he hired Vason Jones as draftsman and superintendent of construction, despite his lack of formal training in architecture.

== Career ==
After practicing architecture at Hentz, Reid, and Adler in Atlanta, he moved to Savannah to design warships for the U.S. Navy during the Second World War. After the war, he became a noted expert in neoclassical architecture. His projects included the renovation of the Mississippi Governor's Mansion; the creation of the 19th-century rooms at the Metropolitan Museum of Art; and the design of buildings in Albany, Georgia, including the Hugh Shackelford House and Albany-Dougherty Courthouse.

In the late 1960s, Jones oversaw the first renovations to the U.S. Department of State's Diplomatic Reception Rooms; he furnished the eighth floor of the Harry S. Truman Building with antiques, finishes, paintings, furniture, and decorative objects. The renovations were widely praised, and he was honored with the department's Certificate of Appreciation for Public Service in 1979. After his work on the Diplomatic Reception Rooms, he was invited to oversee renovations to the White House during the Richard Nixon, Gerald Ford and Jimmy Carter administrations. Working alongside White House curator Clement Conger, he restored the White House's three state parlors—the Red Room, Green Room, and Blue Room to their original 1817 styles. He declined to accept compensation for his work at the White House, viewing it as a patriotic contribution.

Jones designed in the Hanson Residence, Birmingham, Alabama (completed 1967). He also decorated the home of Richard Hampton Jenrette, an 1826 Federal-style house in lower Manhattan, with American Empire style pieces, which both Jones and Jenrette collected.

Jones's Greek Revival home in Albany, Georgia, was built in 1850 by his ancestors; he outfitted the home in furnishings from the period 1815–1820. Jones died in 1980 and is buried in the Oakview Cemetery in Albany, Georgia. Shortly after his death, the arrival hall in the Diplomatic Reception Rooms was named the Edward Vason Jones Memorial Hall in his honor.
