= China Room =

Room in the White House, Washington, D.C.

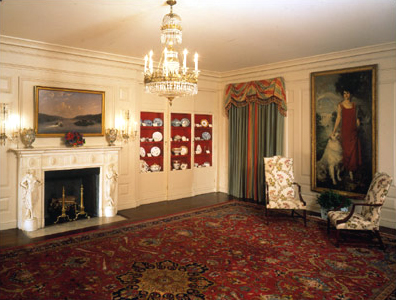
The China Room looking southeast during the administration of Bill Clinton. At right is a painting of Grace Coolidge by Howard Chandler Christy.

White House Ground Floor showing location of the China Room.

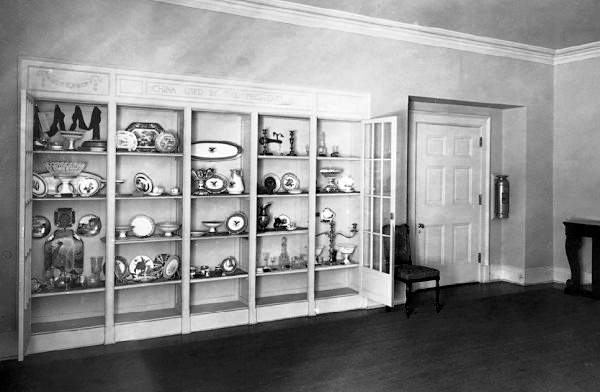
The room in 1918 during the Wilson administration, looking northwest, when it was called the Presidential Collection Room.

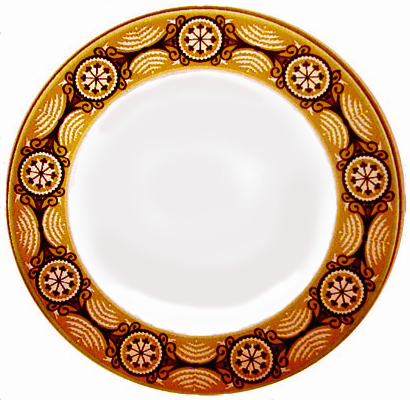
The James Madison state china service was produced in 1814 at the Parisian factory of Jean Népomucène Hermann Nast.

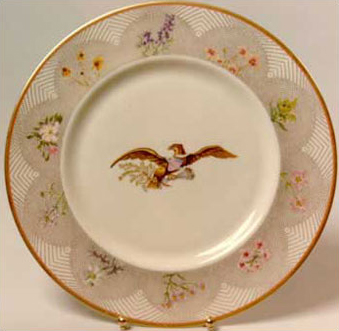
The Lyndon Johnson state china service features American wildflowers and was manufactured in the United States by Castleton China. It was selected by First Lady Lady Bird Johnson.

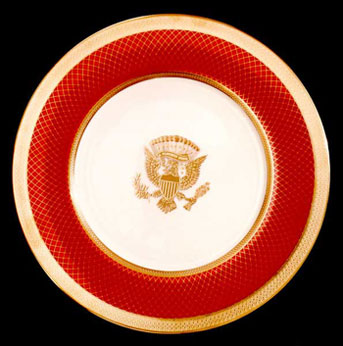
The Reagan state china service was modeled on Woodrow Wilson's china and features the seal of the president of the United States in burnished gold on an ivory background with a border of scarlet. The china was manufactured in the United States by Lenox and selected by First Lady Nancy Reagan.

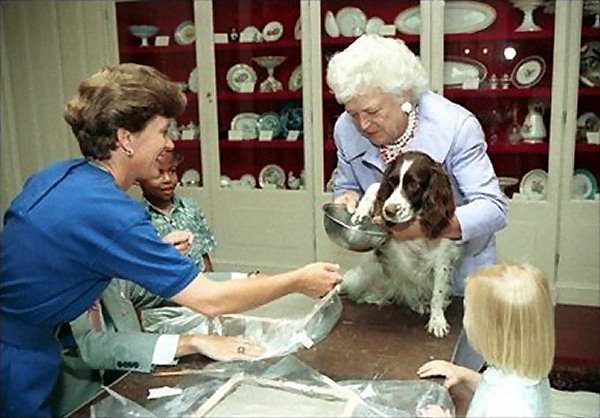
Barbara Bush in the White House China Room, 1991. Millie, Barbara Bush's dog in the China Room.

The China Room is one of the rooms on the Ground Floor of the White House, the home of the president of the United States. The White House's collection of state china is displayed there. The collection ranges from George Washington's Chinese export china to Barack Obama's blue and white themed collection. Almost all administrations are represented with a collection; however, a few are not - most recently, the Trump administration did not have a collection created and instead mainly used the china designed by Hillary Clinton during her time as First Lady. The room is primarily used by the first lady for teas, meetings, and smaller receptions.

== McKim refinishing ==
Until late 1902 when the room was refinished as a public entertainment space during renovations directed by Charles Follen McKim, this room, along with most of the ground floor of the residence, was used for household work and general storage. McKim rebuilt the room with details from the late Georgian period, including robust cove moldings.

== The china collection begins ==
After becoming first lady in 1889, china painting enthusiast Mrs. Benjamin (Caroline Lavinia Scott) Harrison (1832–1892) began to gather and restore china from previous administrations, which she eventually arranged within the mansion's private Family Dining Room. Harrison's successor, Mrs. Theodore (Edith Kermit Carow) Roosevelt (1861–1948), celebrated the then newly initiated efforts of journalist Abby Gunn Baker (1860–1923) to research the growing collection, allowing her to both expand and arrange the collection in Arts and Crafts Movement cabinets in the semi-public ground floor corridor—a space newly defined as a gallery during the 1902 McKim, Mead, and White renovation of the White House. This relocation of the china collection represented a burgeoning recognition and appreciation for the historic artifacts associated with the American presidency; damaged china had been sold or given away as late as the McKinley administration.

In 1917, First Lady Edith Bolling Wilson acknowledged the need for more space for displaying the collection through the suggestions of both Mrs. Baker and White House Chief-Usher Irwin Hood "Ike"Hoover (1871–1933). Baker had continued to research the history of the mansion—particularly that of its celebrated tableware—and argued that the house's history would slip away without official intervention. In response, Mrs. Wilson surveyed the Ground Floor with Hoover, designating a large room toward the southeast, next to the oval Diplomatic Reception Room, as the new "Presidential Collections Room." She also approved its outfitting with built-in cabinetry for the china display. Above each of the three bays of built-in wall cabinets was raised lettering identifying the holdings as CHINA USED BY THE PRESIDENTS.

== Truman and Kennedy periods ==
During the Truman renovation, 1948–1952, the room's walls were paneled in salvaged pine timbers from the house. Architect William Adams Delano detailed the room with bracket molding of mid-Georgian style. (Unfortunately, the architect did not replicate the depth of the removed Wilson-era cabinets, preventing the inclusion of an important standing punchbowl from the Pierce administration—restored by Mrs. Harrison—in the reconstructed interior; the piece was subsequently displayed in the window of the room.) The Truman-era paneling was left unpainted until the Kennedy administration, when, in 1963, French interior designer Stéphane Boudin (1888–1967) of the Paris-based firm Maison Jansen, had it glazed in three shades of gray, with white detailing; corner brackets included in the display cabinet doors were removed at this time. The interiors of the display cabinets were lined with red cotton velvet, and the floor was covered with a similarly hued "Snowflake"-pattern carpet manufactured by Stark Carpet Corporation. At the single window, gray velvet draperies, trimmed in red and white silk fringe, were installed. An early-19th-century classical marble mantel with female supports replaced the Truman Georgian surround.

== Nixon redecoration ==
The room was substantially redecorated in 1970 by First Lady Pat Nixon, with the assistance of White House Curator Clement Conger and preservation architect Edward Vason Jones. The Truman-era bracketed molding was removed and replaced with a Federal period cove molding. The walls were painted a uniform off-white. The existing red accent color, determined by the red gown in Howard Chandler Christy's 1924 portrait of First Lady Grace Coolidge (with her white collie Rob Roy), was retained. The vitrine shelves remained lined with red velvet.

== China collection ==
The collection is arranged chronologically, beginning to the right of the fireplace on the east wall. While not every administration created a service, at least minimal amounts of all china services created for the White House are now in the collection. Sizable amounts of some services going back to the early nineteenth century exist and are sometimes used for small dinners in the President's Dining Room on the Second Floor. The Carters favored using pieces of the Lincolns' "solferino" (purple-rimmed) china for special occasions. Although famous for their red and gold service, the Reagans also enjoyed using the Lincoln china. The Clintons did not take delivery of their state service until near the end of President Clinton's second term. They used the Reagan and Truman services extensively for state dinners but favored the Hayes china, depicting American flora and fauna, for small family dinners, especially holidays.

== Furnishings ==
The rug is an Indo-Isfahan carpet from the early twentieth century. A cut glass Regency style chandelier hangs in the China Room. A pair of late eighteenth-century tureens on the mantel are glazed in red and green slip and are the source for the green and red striped silk taffeta draperies. Two high-backed lolling chairs, made early in the nineteenth century and upholstered in ivory and moss green, are arranged in front of the portrait of Mrs. Coolidge. An English neoclassical mantel is located on the east wall, and Ferdinand Richardt's View on the Mississippi Fifty-Seven Miles Below St. Anthony Falls, Minneapolis, completed in 1858, hangs above the mantel.

== See also ==
- Walter Scott Lenox
