= James R. Ketchum =

American historian (1939–2024)

James Roe Ketchum

White House Curator
- In office 1963–1970
- President: John F. Kennedy; Lyndon B. Johnson; Richard Nixon
- Preceded by: William Vos Elder III
- Succeeded by: Clement Conger

Personal details
- Born: March 15, 1939 Rochester, New York, U.S.
- Died: February 21, 2024 (aged 84) Carlisle, Pennsylvania, U.S.
- Education: Colgate University

James Roe Ketchum (March 15, 1939 – February 21, 2024) served as White House Curator from 1963 to 1970, appointed by President John F. Kennedy and continuing under presidents Lyndon B. Johnson and Richard M. Nixon. He then became Senate Curator from 1970 to 1995, making him the only person to serve as curator at both the White House and Capitol.

Born in Rochester and raised in Clyde, New York, Ketchum graduated from Colgate University in 1960. He went to Washington for graduate studies, first in law school at Georgetown University and then studying American history at George Washington University. He was serving as registrar at the Custis-Lee Mansion in Arlington when the National Park Service lent him to the White House to assist Mamie Eisenhower with upholstering some furnishings. Ketchum died on February 21, 2024, at the age of 84.

== The White House ==
In 1961, when Jacqueline Kennedy launched plans to refurbish the White House, Ketchum became a curatorial assistant, and the following year registrar for art and furnishings. In 1963, the First Lady asked him to become curator. He demurred that at 24 he was too young, but she dismissed his concerns, saying: “That’s what they told Jack.” .

On November 22, 1963, Ketchum received instructions from Mrs. Kennedy, advising him that the president's body would lie in repose in the East Room and that she wanted it decorated as it had been during the mourning period for President Abraham Lincoln. They were draping the East Room's windows and chandeliers in black at 2 a.m. when the president’s coffin was brought to the White House.

Lady Bird Johnson asked Ketchum to remain as curator to continue Jacqueline Kennedy’s restoration and expansion of the White House art collection. He also became swept up into many Johnson family activities, from social entertainments to the weddings of their daughters, Luci and Lynda.

Ketchum found adjustment to Richard Nixon’s administration difficult. He left the White House after repeatedly clashing with chief of staff, H.R. Haldeman.

== The U.S. Senate ==
Senate Majority Leader Mike Mansfield’s concerns over the loss of historical furnishings and deterioration of the artwork in the U.S. Capitol led him to recruit Ketchum as Senate curator.

Ketchum realized that like the White House the Capitol was not a museum but a heavily visited working building, whose artwork needed care and conservation. His office catalogued paintings, sculpture, and furnishings in the Senate wing, supervised the restoration of historic rooms, mounted exhibits, and even catered some events.

A Senate resolution made him Curator Emeritus upon his retirement. Majority Leader Robert Dole asserted that “Jim was the driving force behind the restoration of the old Senate and old Supreme Court Chambers, the President’s Room, and countless other important treasures. Paintings and documents have been recovered and preserved due to Jim’s tireless efforts. He has helped us all better understand this institution and the Capitol though exhibitions, lectures, publications, and other educational programs.”

== See also ==
- White House Office of the Curator
- Curator of the United States Senate
