= Red chamber =

Red chamber may refer to:

- Dream of the Red Chamber, an 18th-century Chinese novel by Cao Xueqin
- An informal term for the Senate of Canada, properly the chamber where it meets
- Legislative Council of Quebec's convening hall

== See also ==
- Green chamber (disambiguation)
- Red hall (disambiguation)
- Red room (disambiguation)
