= Red hall =

Red hall or Red Hall may refer to:

- The Red Chamber, or red hall, chamber of the former Legislative Council of Quebec, Canada
- Red Basilica, also known as the 'Red Hall', a temple to Serapis in Pergamon, Turkey
- Red Hall, in Leeds, England, former headquarters and metonym for the Rugby Football League
- Red Hall (Slovenia) (Rdeča dvorana), sports facility in Velenje, Slovenia
- Red Hall, an area in Darlington, England
- Red Hall, Bourne, England, historic house

== See also ==
- The Red Room (disambiguation)
- Red chamber (disambiguation)
