= Lorraine Waxman Pearce =

American art curator and scholar

Lorraine Waxman Pearce, sometimes known as Lorraine Pearce, (April 14, 1934 – March 14, 2017) was a decorative arts scholar and the inaugural White House art curator, key to the Kennedy restoration of the White House.

Subsequent to her hiring by Jacqueline Kennedy in 1961, Pearce wrote the first guide that covered the White House's historic furnishings, which included George Washington's mirror, a chair from Lincoln's bedroom, a sofa attributed to Dolley Madison and items from John Tyler.

Pearce was a 1955 graduate of City College of New York and received her master's in early American culture from the Winterthur Program, a partnership between the Winterthur Museum and the University of Delaware. While at Winterthur where she worked as a registrar, she became known for her scholarship on the French impact on American arts. Henry Francis du Pont, the museum founder and chairman of the White House Fine Arts Committee, recommended Pearce for the curator role.

Pearce resigned as curator in 1962 and spent much of the rest of her life in arts education.
