= Curator of the United States Senate =

Office in the United States Senate

The curator of the United States Senate is responsible for the care of the Senate collection of art and artifacts. The current curatress of the Senate is Melinda K. Smith.

== Purpose ==
On behalf of the U.S. Senate Commission on Art, the Office of the Senate Curator develops and implements the museum and preservation programs for the U.S. Senate. The Office collects, preserves, and interprets the Senate's fine and decorative art, historical artifacts and images, and architectural features within the Senate wing of the United States Capitol and Senate Office Buildings.

Through exhibits, publications, and other programs, the Office educates the public about the Senate and its collections. The Office of Senate Curator is also responsible for the supervision and care of the Old Senate Chamber and the Old Supreme Court Chamber.

The Office has established environmentally controlled museum quality storage spaces; overseen foreign gifts received by senators as part of their diplomatic duties; and reinterpreted the paint colors, drapery, and chair upholstery of the historic chambers.

In 1968, Senate Majority Leader Mike Mansfield, in conjunction with Senate Minority Leader Everett Dirksen, established a Commission on Art and Antiquities (now the Senate Commission on Art), with the secretary of the Senate serving as its executive secretary, and created the position of Senate Curator.

== List of Senate curators ==
- Joseph Dougherty 1968–1969
- Richard A. Baker (acting) 1969–1970
- James R. Ketchum 1970–1995
- Diane K. Skvarla 1995–2014
- Melinda K. Smith 2014–present
