= Redrum =

Redrum ("murder" spelled backwards) or Red Rum may refer to:

== Media ==
- Redrum (2018 film), an Indian Hindi-language psychological thriller film
- Redrum (2022 film), a Bangladeshi crime thriller film
- Redrum, a 2007 film starring American actress Jill Marie Jones
- Murder spelled backwards in Stephen King's horror novel The Shining (1977) and its derivatives

=== Music ===
- Redrum (band), a Japanese indie rock band
- "Redrum" (Era Istrefi song), a song recorded by Kosovo Albanian singer Era Istrefi
- "Redrum" (Sorana and David Guetta song), 2022 single by Romanian singer Sorana and French disc jockey David Guetta
- "Redrum" (21 Savage song), 2024 single by British-American rapper 21 Savage
- "Redrum", a song from Esham's 2000 compilation album Bootleg: From the Lost Vault, Vol. 1
- "Redrum", a song from Skepta's 2019 album Ignorance Is Bliss
- "Redrum", a 2025 single by Irish singer-songwriter Bambie Thug
- "Red Rum", a song from Project Pat's 2000 compilation album Murderers & Robbers

=== Television ===
- Redrum, a 2013–2015 series formerly broadcast by Investigation Discovery

==== Episodes ====
- "Red Rum", a first-season episode of the American drama television series The Mentalist
- "Redrum", a seventh-season episode of American procedural forensics crime drama television series CSI: Crime Scene Investigation
- "Redrum" (The X-Files), the sixth episode of the eighth season of the American science fiction television series The X-Files

== Other ==
- Commodore Redrum, musician performing with American heavy metal band Swashbuckle
- Red Rum (1965–1995), a champion Thoroughbred steeplechaser
- Redrum, an installation by Finnish architect Marco Casagrande
