= Lydia Tederick =

American curator

Lydia Tederick is a former White House curator. She arrived in the White House's curatorial office in 1979 and first served as an assistant curator before becoming the eighth White House curator. She had a special focus on the history and workings of the First Ladies as well as the care of the White House's portraits. As curator, however, she was also responsible for research into questions about other Washington, DC statues and sculptures such as the Pierre-Jean David d’Angers statue of Thomas Jefferson, a gift from Uriah Phillips Levy.

Tederick received her Bachelor of Arts in art history and political science from Northern Arizona University and a Master of Arts in museum studies in 1980 from George Washington University.
