= The Red Room (Vallotton) =

Painting by Félix Vallotton

- La Chambre rouge (French)
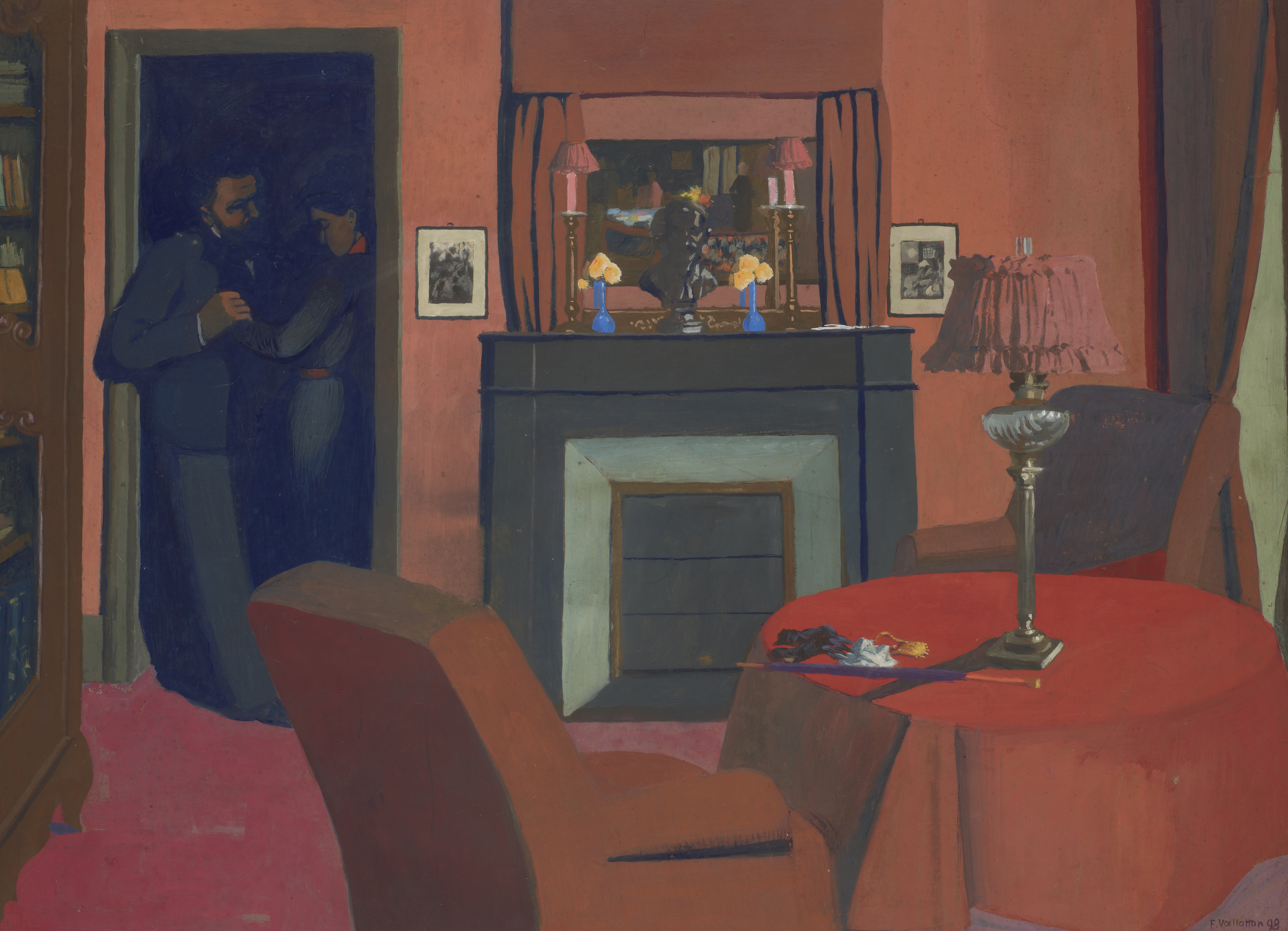
- Artist: Félix Vallotton
- Year: 1898
- Medium: Tempera on cardboard
- Dimensions: 50 cm × 68.5 cm (20 in × 27.0 in)
- Location: Cantonal Museum of Fine Arts, Lausanne

The Red Room (French: La Chambre rouge) is an 1898 tempera-on-cardboard painting by Swiss artist Félix Vallotton. It depicts a red interior and a couple standing in a dark doorway. It is preserved at the Cantonal Museum of Fine Arts in Lausanne, Switzerland.

== Description ==
The Red Room is tempera on cardboard and measures 50 × 68.5 cm; it is signed and dated at the bottom right "F. Vallotton 98". The painting is the first in a series of six works titled Interiors with Figures, which was exhibited at the Durand-Ruel Gallery in Paris in March 1899. Also present was the woodcut series Intimacies, which featured the same theme and scenarios and was published in December 1898.

The title, in addition to being descriptive, may be an allusion to the 1879 novel of the same name by August Strindberg.

An interior, dominated by various shades of red, is represented in both the decoration and the furniture—the wallpaper and the rug, the curtains that frame the mirror on the mantelpiece, the tablecloth, the armchairs, and the lampshades. A strong light from the right creates intense shadows; a light curtain on the right end suggests a window. All elements convey an atmosphere of luxury. According to Keiko Wada of Kyoto University of the Arts, all of these elements were likely modeled after objects that Vallotton owned in his home, although the layout of the room itself is imagined.

In the left background is a couple standing in a completely open doorway leading to a dark room. The gloom and shadows make it difficult to appreciate their expressions. The bearded man, with his back against the jamb, holds the woman's right hand against his chest and appears to be staring at her. However, the woman, leaning on the opposite jamb, has her head bowed and does not seem to react.

In the right foreground is a round table with a striking bright red tablecloth and two armchairs. In addition to a lamp on the table is a white handkerchief, wrinkled as if it was used to dry tears, as well as a small yellow cloth bag and a pair of black feminine gloves, objects that suggest that the woman has just arrived at the room to have a secret date with the man.

A bust of the painter rests on the shelf of the chimney, turning the work into a self-portrait. It is flanked by two small blue vases with yellow flowers and two table lamps. Large Interior with Six Persons, a painting by Édouard Vuillard, also appears in part, reflected in the mirror as if hanging on the opposite wall, although it does not look inverted. The painting deals with family drama caused by his unfaithful brother-in-law, Ker-Xavier Roussel.

== Provenance ==
In 1908, a Georges Hasen in Saint Petersburg received the painting from Vallotton. In 1929, it was placed in the Gallery Vallotton in Lausanne via "S. Oppenheimer". Eight years later, it was acquired by Fernand Cardis. In 1983, the city's Cantonal Museum of Fine Arts acquired the painting through Cardis; it would become an official part of the museum's collection in 2000.

== Cited works ==
- Nakamura, Shuko (2010). フェリックス・ヴァロットンの室内画における開口部の表現について [On the representation of openings in Félix Vallotton's interior paintings] (in Japanese). Tokyo: Seijo University's Department of Aesthetics and Art History (16). ISSN 1340-5861.
- Wada, Keiko (2017). 「親密な」室内画における「居心地の悪さ」について ――フェリックス・ヴァロットンの室内画をめぐって―― [On the 'uncomfortable' feelings in 'intimate' interior paintings: on the interior paintings of Felix Vallotton] (PDF) (in Japanese). The Japanese Society for Aesthetics. Archived from the original on 6 November 2021.
