= White House Office of the Curator =

Office of the White House

White House Curator
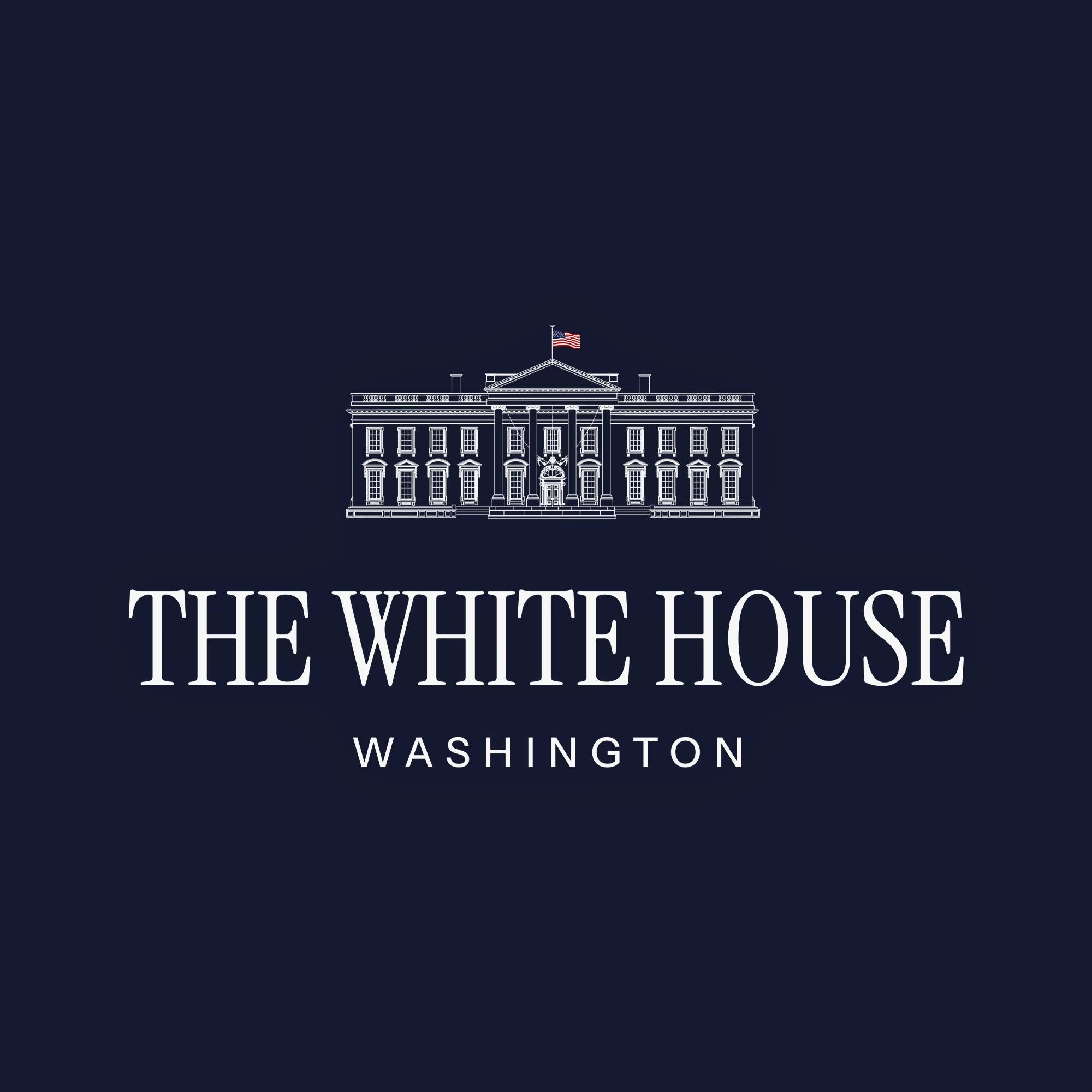

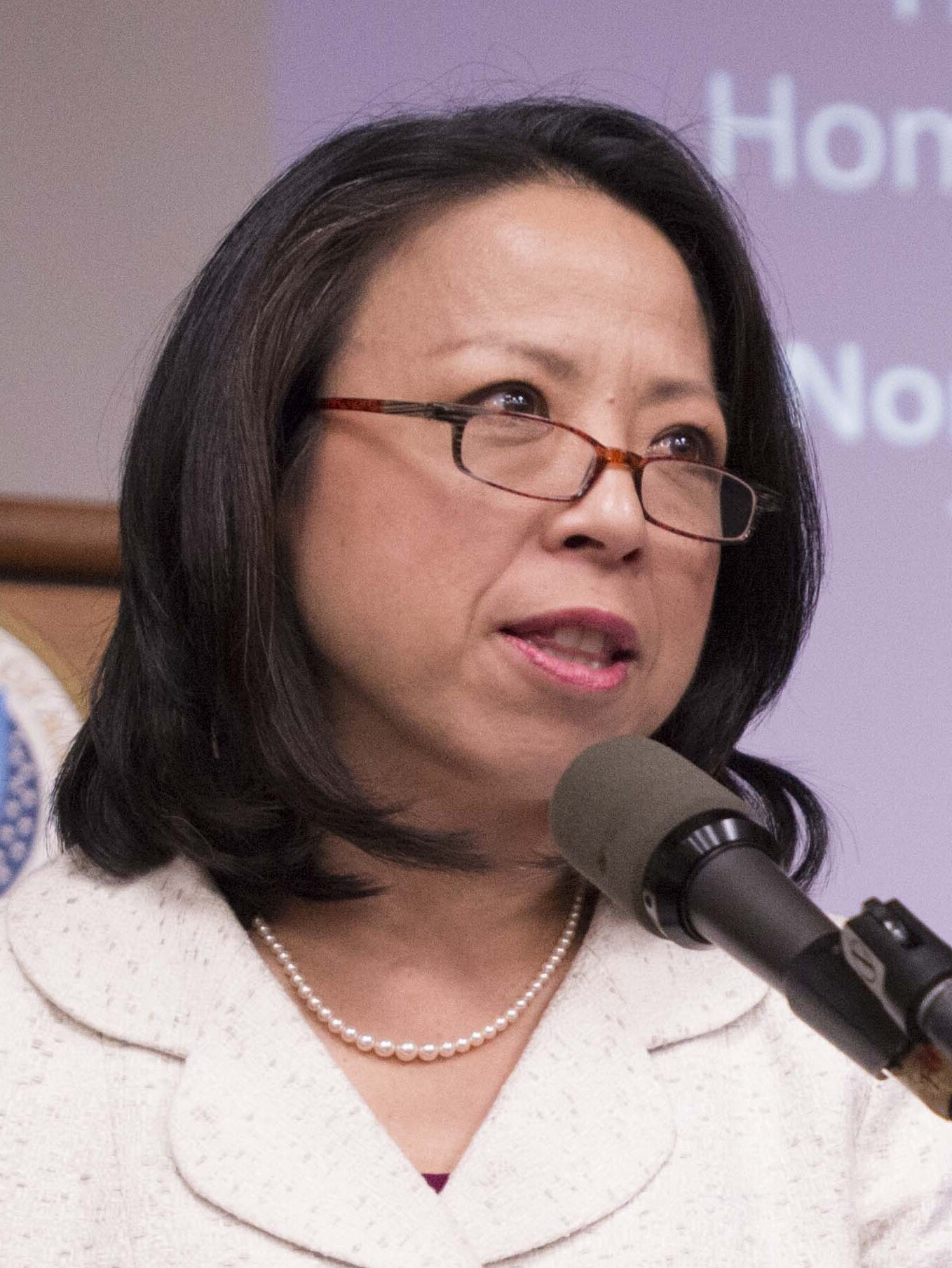
- Incumbent; Donna Hayashi Smith
- Executive Residence
- Appointer: President of the United States
- Formation: 1961; 65 years ago
- First holder: Lorraine Waxman Pearce
- Website: www.whitehouse.gov

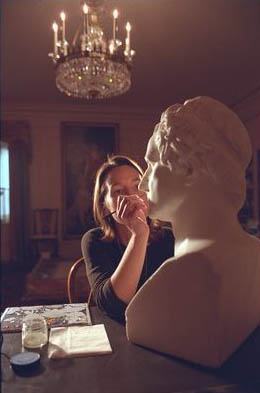
A marble bust of George Washington by sculptor Giuseppe Ceracchi (1751–1801) receives conservation work in the China Room.

The White House Office of the Curator is charged with the conservation and study of the collection of fine art, furniture, and decorative objects used to furnish both the public and private rooms of the White House as an official residence and as an accredited historic house museum.

The office began in 1961 during the administration of President John F. Kennedy while First Lady Jacqueline Kennedy oversaw the restoration of the White House. The office is located in the ground floor of the White House Executive Residence. The office, headed by the curator of the White House, includes an associate curator, an assistant curator, and a curatorial assistant. The office works with the chief usher, the Committee for the Preservation of the White House, and the White House Historical Association.

The most recent White House curator is Donna Hayashi Smith, appointed in May 2024. Previously it was Lydia Tederick, appointed in 2017.

== Curators' charge ==
The curator of the White House, or less formally White House curator, is head of the White House Office of the Curator which is charged with the conservation and study of the collection of fine art, furniture, and decorative objects used to furnish both the public and private rooms of the White House.

The first curator of the White House was Lorraine Waxman Pearce, appointed in March 1961. Pearce graduated from the preservation program at the Henry Francis du Pont Winterthur Museum.

== Curators of the White House ==
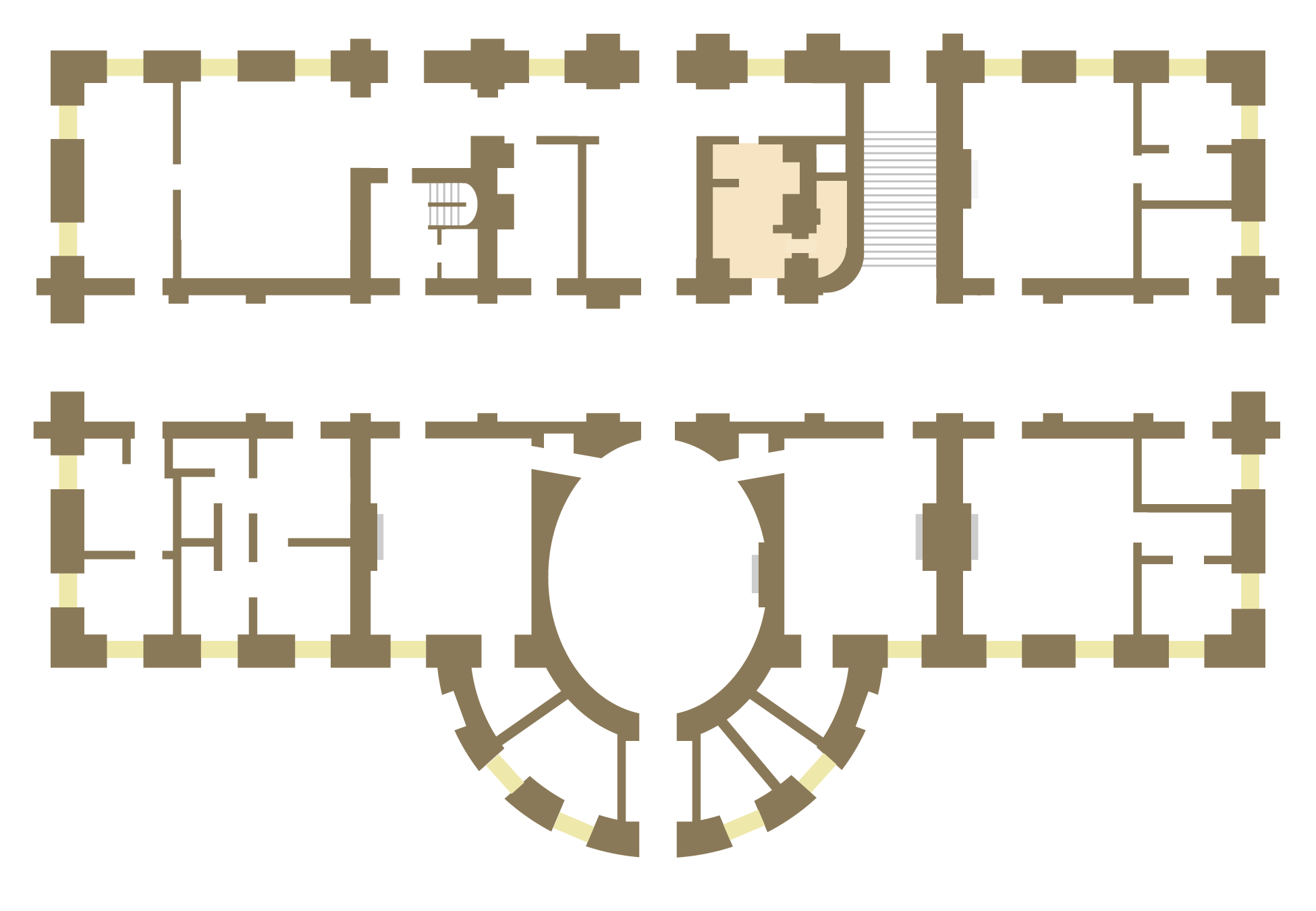
White House Ground Floor showing location of the Office of the Curator.

To date, eight curators have served in the White House; they are:

No.	Image	Name (Birth–Death)	Term of office	President(s)
Post established in 1961
1		Lorraine Waxman Pearce (1934–2017)	1961–1962	John F. Kennedy
2		William Voss Elder III (1932–2014)	1962–1963	John F. Kennedy
3		James R. Ketchum (1939–2024)	1963–1969	John F. Kennedy; Lyndon B. Johnson; Richard Nixon
4		Clement Conger (1912–2004)	1970–1986	Richard Nixon; Gerald Ford; Jimmy Carter; Ronald Reagan
5		Rex Scouten (1924–2013)	1986–1997	Ronald Reagan; George H. W. Bush; Bill Clinton
6		Betty C. Monkman (1942–2025)	1997–2002	Bill Clinton; George W. Bush
7		William G. Allman (1952–)	2002–2017	George W. Bush; Barack Obama; Donald Trump
8		Lydia Tederick (1955–)	2017–2024	Donald Trump; Joe Biden
9		Donna Hayashi Smith	2024–present	Joe Biden; Donald Trump

== See also ==
- Art in the White House
- Committee for the Preservation of the White House
- White House Historical Association
