= Margaret Brown Klapthor =

American curator, historian, and author (1922–1994)

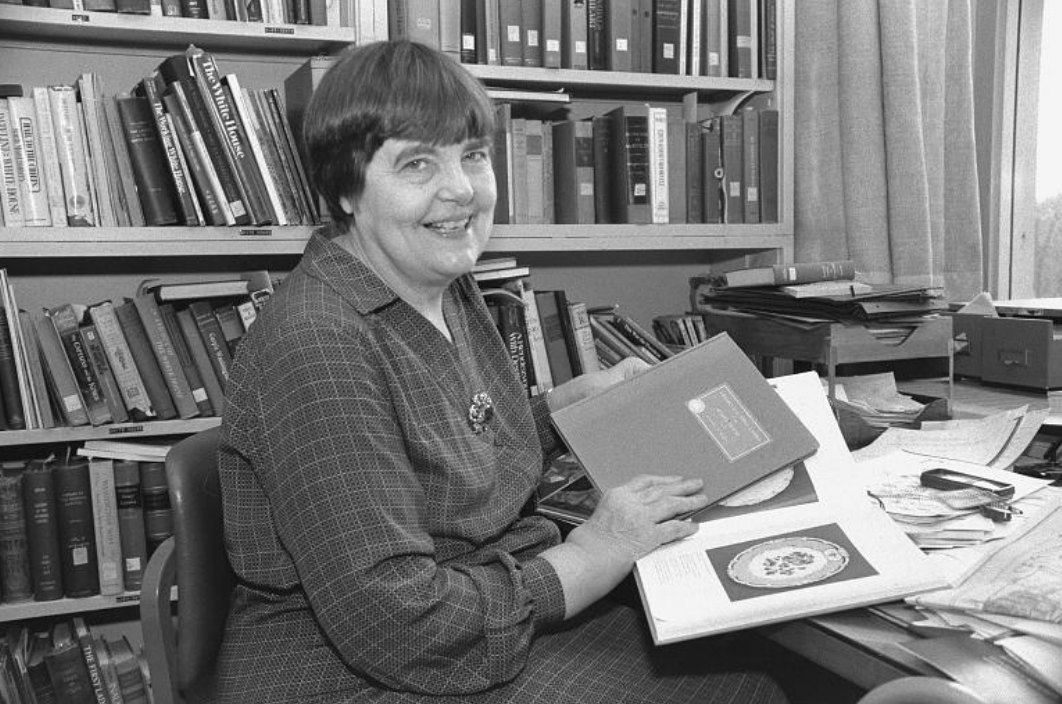
- Margaret Brown Klapthor, 1983, Smithsonian Institution Archives
- Born: Margaret Brown; January 16, 1922; Henderson, Kentucky
- Died: September 26, 1994 (aged 72)
- Education: University of Maryland
- Known for: Expert on White House history

Margaret Brown Klapthor (January 16, 1922, Henderson, Kentucky – September 26, 1994, Washington, D.C., USA) was a curator of the Smithsonian Institution's First Ladies collection and an expert on the history of the White House. She served as chairman of the National Museum of American History's Division of Political History.

Klapthor developed collections and exhibitions including the First Ladies' Gowns Collection. Her published books include The First Ladies cook book (1965), First Ladies (1975), and Official White House china (1975), all of which have been republished, some in multiple editions.

== Family and education ==
Margaret Washington Brown was born January 16, 1922, in Henderson, Kentucky, to Paul Dennis Brown and Margaret Berry. She had two sisters, Mary Berry Brown (later Moore) (1918–) and Frances (1923–1941). She attended Sacred Heart High School in La Plata, Charles County, Maryland, and then St. Mary's Seminary Junior College in St. Mary's City, Maryland.

She attended the University of Maryland, graduating with a B.A. in 1943. She then joined the Smithsonian Institution as a scientific aide, working in the Civil Section of the Division of History at the United States National Museum.

In 1956, Margaret Washington Brown married Frank Edward Klapthor (1914–1994). She collaborated with her father Paul Dennis Brown on The History of Charles County, Maryland, written in its Tercentenary Year of 1958.

== Career ==
During her forty-year career at the Smithsonian, Klapthor was employed as an Assistant Curator in the division of Civil History from 1947 to 1948; an Assistant Curator from 1949 to 1951; an Associate Curator in Civil History from 1952 to 1957; an Associate Curator, 1957–1970; and a Curator from 1971 to 1983. She became curator of the Smithsonian's First Ladies collection and chairman of its department of national and military history. After retiring in 1983, she was a Curator Emeritus in the Division of Political History.

Klapthor worked on restoration of the collection of First Ladies gowns from the White House. In 1954, Klapthor escorted Queen Elizabeth The Queen Mother and Mamie Eisenhower, wife of then-president Dwight D. Eisenhower through the First Ladies exhibit. She located Dolley Madison's inauguration gown, and arranged for its indefinite loan to the Smithsonian from the William Rockhill Nelson Gallery of Art in Kansas City, Missouri. Klapthor's work formed the basis of the First Ladies Hall created at the Museum of History and Technology in 1964. She published Dresses of the First Ladies of the White House, as exhibited in the United States National Museum (1952). Her First Ladies (1975), about the women themselves, was repeatedly expanded and republished.

Another area in which Klapthor specialized was White House china. She organized a collection of White House china as part of the creation of the First Ladies Hall, combining displays of the gowns and the china in social settings reflective of their use. Her Official White House china : 1789 to the present (1975) was republished in 1999.

She also wrote The First Ladies Cook Book: Favorite Recipes of All the Presidents of the United States (1965), which was repeatedly republished. New York Times food critic Craig Claiborne wrote that it was "perhaps the most comprehensive and detailed volume ever written" about the dining habits of American Presidents and their wives.

== Later life ==
Klapthor's father, Paul Brown, died in 1974. In 1978, she and her sister Mary Berry Brown Moore donated the Papers of the Paul Dennis Brown Family to the archives of the University of Maryland.

Towards the end of her life, Margaret Brown Klapthor suffered from rheumatoid arthritis and had to use a wheelchair. Her husband Frank died on May 12, 1994. Margaret died of stomach cancer on September 26, 1994. She was survived by her children, Paul Edward Klapthor, Carlson Brown Klapthor, and Frances Andrews. She is buried in Saint Ignatius Cemetery, Port Tobacco, Charles County, Maryland.

== Selected publications ==
- Klapthor, Margaret Brown; Morrison, Howard Alexander (1982). G. Washington, a figure upon the stage. Washington, D.C.: Smithsonian Institution Press : National Museum of American History, Smithsonian Institution.
- Klapthor, Margaret Brown (1975). Official White House china : 1789 to the present. Washington: Smithsonian. Republished 1999.
- Klapthor, Margaret Brown (1975). First ladies. Washington, D.C.: White House Historical Association. First of multiple editions.
- Klapthor, Margaret Brown (1967). Maryland's presidential first ladies: Mrs. Zachary Taylor and Mrs. John Quincy Adams from Calvert County. Prince Frederic, Md.: Calvert County Historical Society.
- Klapthor, Margaret Brown (1965). The First Ladies cook book; favorite recipes of all the Presidents of the United States. New York: Published for Parents' Magazine Press, by Home Library Press. First of multiple editions.
- Klapthor, Margaret Brown; Brown, Paul Dennis (n.d.). History of Charles County, Maryland : written in its tercentenary year of 1958. La Plata, Md.: Charles County Tercentenary, Inc. Republished 1995.
- Klapthor, Margaret Brown (1952). Dresses of the First Ladies of the White House, as exhibited in the United States National Museum. Washington, D.C.: Smithsonian Institution.
