= The Red Room (Strindberg novel) =

Novel by August Strindberg

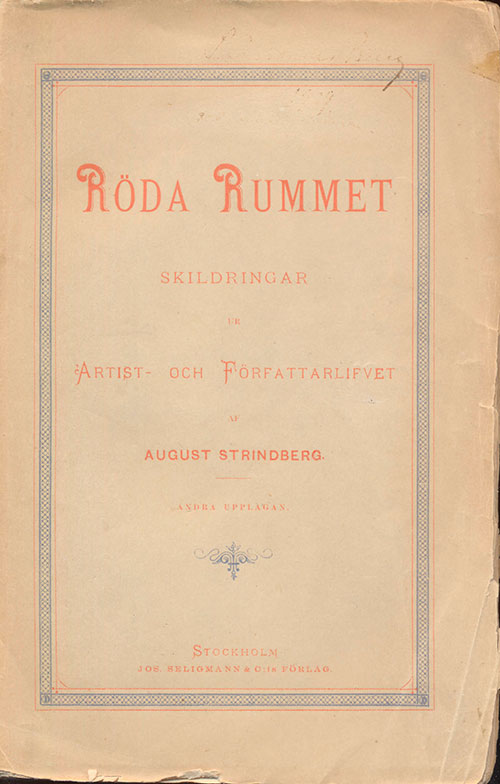
- First edition of The Red Room (1879)
- Author: August Strindberg
- Original title: Röda rummet
- Translator: Ellie Schleussner
- Language: Swedish
- Set in: Stockholm
- Published: 1879
- Publisher: Jos Seligmann & Co
- Publication date: 1879
- Publication place: Sweden
- English publication date: 1913

The Red Room (Swedish: Röda rummet) is a Swedish novel by August Strindberg that was first published in 1879. A satire of Stockholm society, it has frequently been described as the first modern Swedish novel. In this novel, Strindberg reflects on his own experiences of living in poverty while writing this novel from February to November 1879. While receiving mixed reviews in Sweden, it was acclaimed in Denmark, where Strindberg was hailed as a genius. As a result of The Red Room, Strindberg became famous throughout Scandinavia. Edvard Brandes wrote that it "makes the reader want to join the fight against hypocrisy and reaction."

An English translation by Ellie Schleussner, translator of several other works by Strindberg, was published in 1913 in London and is now in the public domain. There is also a 2009 translation by Peter Graves.

== Plot ==
A young idealistic civil servant, Arvid Falk, leaves the drudgery of bureaucracy to become a journalist and author. As he explores various social activities—politics, publishing, theatre, philanthropy, and business—he finds more hypocrisy and political corruption than he thought possible. He takes refuge with a group of "bohemians", who meet in a red dining room in Berns Salonger to discuss these matters.

== Reception ==
American literary critic John Albert Macy (husband of Anne Sullivan) wrote in his The Critical Game (published in 1922):

The Red Room is a satire on life in Stockholm, on life everywhere. The pathetic struggle of the artistic and literary career, its follies and pretenses, the fatuity of politics, the dishonesty of journalism, the disillusion that awaits the aspiring actor, all these things run riot through the lively pages. Strindberg's satire is severe, it is sometimes hard, but it is not mean. He has a large if rather distant sympathy for the poor fellows whose aspirations, failures, dissipations, and friendships he portrays. Of two young critics he says: "And they wrote of human merit and human unworthiness and broke hearts as if they were breaking egg-shells". He writes of their unconscious inhumanity and blindness in a way that reveals his own clearness of vision and fundamental humanity. The laughter of a somber humorist has in it a tenderness unknown to merry natures.

== Adaptations ==
The novel was adapted into a comic book by Per Demervall.

== See also ==
- The Red Room (Vallotton)
