= Clement Conger =

American museum curator and civil servant (1912–2004)

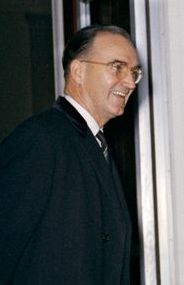
- Conger in November 1961

4th White House Curator
- In office 1970–1986
- President: Richard Nixon; Gerald Ford; Jimmy Carter; Ronald Reagan
- Preceded by: James R. Ketchum
- Succeeded by: Rex Scouten

1st Curator of the Diplomatic Reception Rooms
- In office 1961–1992
- Deputy: Gail F. Serfaty
- Preceded by: Position established
- Succeeded by: Harry Schnabel Jr.

Deputy Chief of Protocol of the United States
- In office 1958–1961

Assistant Chief of Protocol of the United States
- In office 1955–1957

Special Assistant, Arms Control and Disarmament Agency

Assistant Secretary of the Combined Chiefs of Staff
- In office c.1943–c.1945

Personal details
- Born: Clement Ellis Conger; October 15, 1912 Harrisonburg, Virginia, U.S.
- Died: January 11, 2004 (aged 91) Delray Beach, Florida, U.S.
- Cause of death: Pneumonia
- Resting place: Glendale, California, U.S.
- Spouse: Lianne Hopkins Conger
- Children: William; Jay; Shelley
- Education: Strayer College; George Washington University
- Occupation: Cultural heritage management
- Known for: Creation of the Diplomatic Reception Rooms
- Committees: Fine Arts Committee

Military service
- Allegiance: United States of America
- Branch/service: United States Army
- Years of service: c.1940–1945
- Rank: Major
- Commands: Assistant Secretary of the Combined Chiefs of Staff

Clement Ellis Conger (October 15, 1912 – January 11, 2004) was an American museum curator and public servant. He served as director of the Office of Fine Arts at the U.S. Department of State, where he worked as curator of both the Diplomatic Reception Rooms and Blair House. He also served as Curator of the White House under U.S. Presidents Nixon, Ford, Carter, and Reagan. Prior to working as a curator, Conger served as a Foreign Service Officer, as the Deputy Chief of Protocol of the United States, and as Assistant Secretary of the Combined Chiefs of Staff.

== Early life and education ==
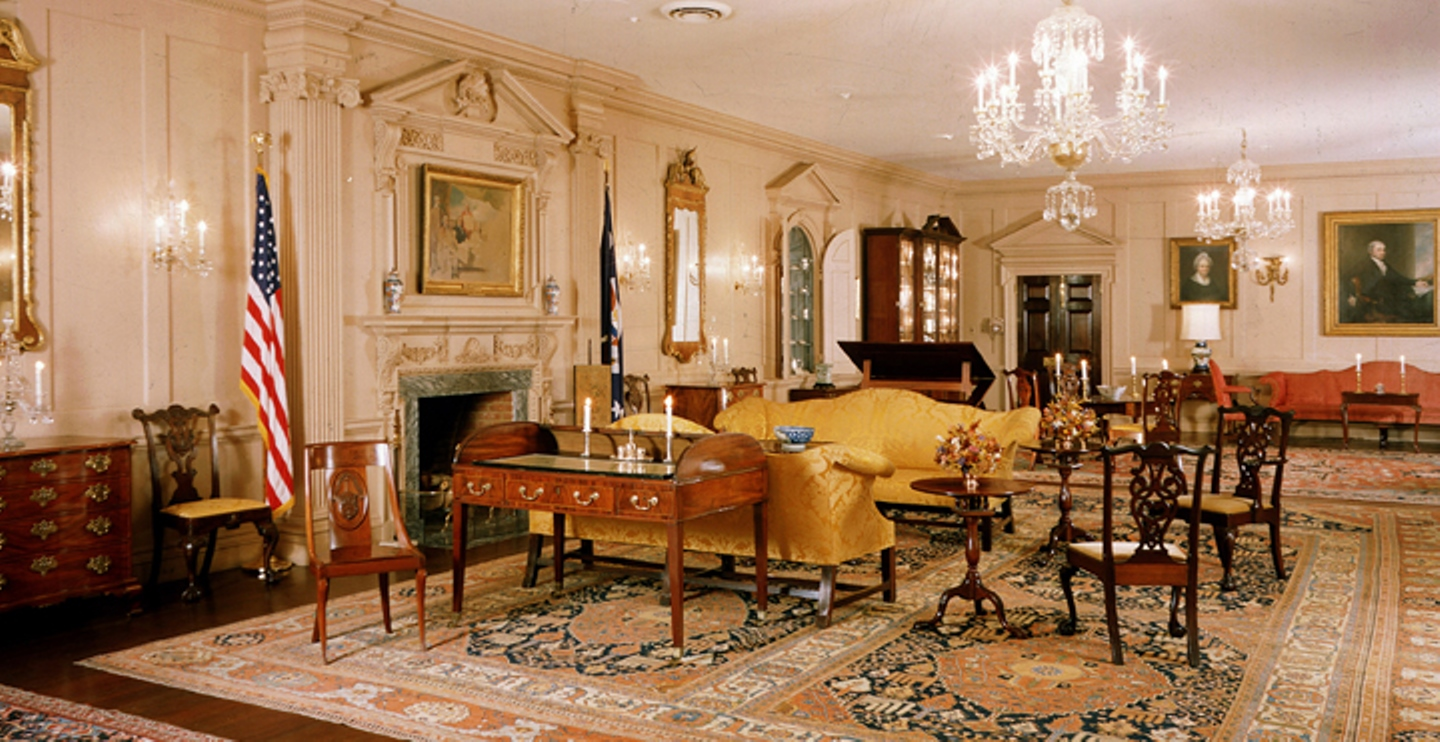
The John Quincy Adams State Drawing Room, part of the Diplomatic Reception Rooms at the United States Department of State, where Conger assembled most of this furniture and art

Conger was born on October 15, 1912, in Harrisonburg, Virginia. He attended and graduated from Strayer College in Washington, D.C.

== Career ==
Following graduation from Strayer College, Conger worked as an office manager for the Chicago Tribune and for U.S. Rubber Co. He was assistant secretary for the Combined Chiefs of Staff during World War II. He worked for the United States State Department, where he served as deputy chief of protocol from 1958 to 1961. In 1992, he received the Henry Francis du Pont Award from the Winterthur Museum, Garden and Library, which recognizes awardees' "contributions of national significance to the knowledge, preservation, and enjoyment of American decorative arts, architecture, landscape design, and gardens."

== Death ==
Conger died of pneumonia in Delray Beach, Florida, on January 11, 2004, and was interred in Glendale, California.

== Works ==
- Clement E. Conger, Mary K. Itsell, Treasures of State: Fine and Decorative Art in the Diplomatic Reception Rooms of the U.S. Department of State, H.N. Abrams, 1991, ISBN 978-0-8109-3911-0
