= Betty C. Monkman =

White House Curator and author (1942–2025)

Betty C. Monkman (August 24, 1942 – January 7, 2025) was an American curator and author who was a White House Curator. She wrote The White House: Its Historic Furnishings and First Families and The Living White House.

Monkman joined the Curator's office in 1967 in Lyndon Johnson's administration and helped fill gaps in the White House's collection. Monkman served as Chief Curator from 1997 through 2002. Among her duties were supervising the changeover between presidential administrations, including between Bill Clinton and George W. Bush.

Upon her retirement, she had served as curator under eight presidents.

Monkman died from leukemia on January 7, 2025, at the age of 82.
