= Official White House portraits of Nancy and Ronald Reagan =

Paintings by Aaron Shikler and Everett Kinstler

There have been two official White House portraits of President Ronald Reagan and a single official portrait of Nancy Reagan. The first portrait of Ronald Reagan was painted by Aaron Shikler in 1989 but was rejected as being an insufficient likeness and put into storage in 1991. A second portrait, painted by Everett Kinstler in 1991, was deemed more successful and currently hangs in the White House. Shikler's 1989 portrait of Nancy Reagan is also currently part of the White House collection.

== Shikler portraits ==
Nancy Reagan, 1989

Ronald Reagan, 1989

Official White House portraits by Aaron Shikler

Aaron Shikler's portraits of Nancy and Ronald Reagan were unveiled on November 15, 1989 in a ceremony at the White House. The ceremony was attended by an audience of 100 former Reagan administration officials and VIPs. The Shikler portrait was subsequently deemed by Reagan's friends and supporters as being an insufficient likeness of him, and it was moved from the lobby of the White House to storage in April 1991.

Ronald Reagan is depicted standing in the portrait wearing a blue suit with a red tie. His fingers rest on the Oval Office desk. A bronze statue of a cowboy stands behind him. Shikler had destroyed his original portrait of Reagan and repainted it after Nancy expressed her disapproval. Reagan's facial expression was described a "somewhat odd grin" by Associated Press in 1991. In Nancy Reagan's portrait she wears a red dress and stands in front of the closed doors of the State Dining Room. Shikler had previously painted an oil on paper portrait of Nancy Reagan in 1985. It was donated to the National Portrait Gallery by Time magazine.

The paintings were commissioned by the retail executive Milton Petrie and his wife, Carroll, and the White House Historical Association. Jerry Zipkin contacted the Petries to ask if they would pay for the portraits. In January 1990 the Petries attended a private dinner for 30 people at the White House at which the portraits were unveiled. Carroll Petrie subsequently recalled that "After dinner they unveiled the portraits. The one of Nancy was so beautiful. Unfortunately, the one of President Reagan was not terribly good. They redid his, but it still wasn't good. So they got another artist to do it".

Shikler also donated a 1991 portrait of Ronald Reagan to the National Portrait Gallery. The National Portrait Gallery also has a 1980 oil on paper portrait by Shikler of Reagan, donated by Time magazine.

== Kinstler portrait of Ronald Reagan ==
Ronald Reagan, 1991

Official White House portrait by Everett Kinstler

Everett Kinstler was hired to paint the second official portrait of Reagan. He is depicted in the portrait sitting on the Truman Balcony of the White House. The Jefferson Monument is shown in the background. It is the only official presidential portrait to show the subject outside. Kinstler said he painted Reagan "... just the way he appeared to me – a confident man with a ready smile and good humor. He seemed perfectly comfortable with who he was". It was first displayed at the White House on the occasion of a state dinner honoring the President of Nicaragua, Violeta Chamorro. It was funded by Mr. and Mrs. Joe Allbritton.

During the second presidency of Donald Trump the portrait of Reagan hung in the Oval Office, to the left of Trump as he sat at his desk. According to The Washington Post, the effect was that "Reagan appear[ed] to be smiling approvingly on Trump's endeavors".

== See also ==
- Art in the White House
- Portraits of presidents of the United States
