= Nancy Reagan =

First Lady of the United States from 1981 to 1989

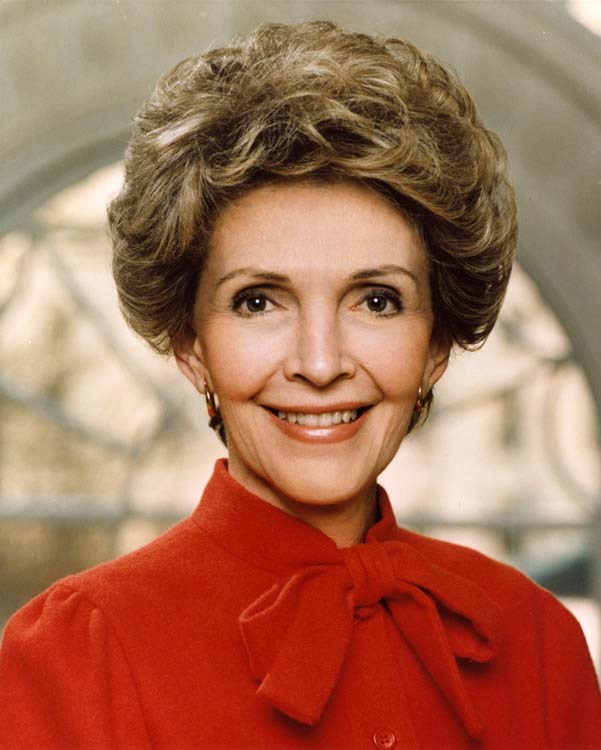
- Official portrait, 1983

First Lady of the United States
- In role January 20, 1981 – January 20, 1989
- President: Ronald Reagan
- Preceded by: Rosalynn Carter
- Succeeded by: Barbara Bush

First Lady of California
- In role January 2, 1967 – January 6, 1975
- Governor: Ronald Reagan
- Preceded by: Bernice Brown
- Succeeded by: Gloria Deukmejian (1983)

Personal details
- Born: Anne Frances Robbins; July 6, 1921 New York City, U.S.
- Died: March 6, 2016 (aged 94) Los Angeles, California, U.S.
- Resting place: Ronald Reagan Presidential Library and Museum
- Party: Republican
- Spouse: Ronald Reagan (m. 1952; died 2004)
- Children: Patti; Ron
- Parent: Edith Luckett Davis (mother)
- Education: Smith College (BA)
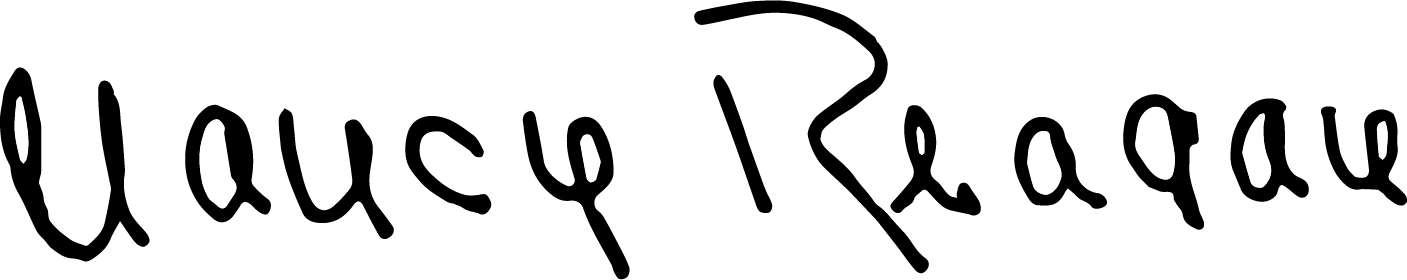
- Signature
- Nancy Reagan's voice Nancy Reagan on the federal drug policy of the United States; Recorded October 2, 1982

Nancy Davis Reagan (Note: Pronounced /ˈreɪɡən/ RAY-gən) (born Anne Frances Robbins; July 6, 1921 – March 6, 2016) was an American actress who was First Lady of the United States from 1981 to 1989. She was the second wife of Ronald Reagan, the 40th president of the United States.

Reagan was born at Sloane Hospital for Women in Washington Heights, Manhattan New York City. After her parents separated, she lived in Maryland with an aunt and uncle for six years. When her mother remarried in 1929, she moved to Chicago and was adopted by her mother's second husband. As Nancy Davis, she was a Hollywood actress in the 1940s and 1950s, starring in films such as The Next Voice You Hear..., Night into Morning, and Donovan's Brain. In 1952, she married Ronald Reagan, who was then president of the Screen Actors Guild. He had two children from his previous marriage to Jane Wyman, and he and Nancy had two children together. Nancy Reagan was first lady of California when her husband was governor from 1967 to 1975, and she began to work with the Foster Grandparents Program.

Reagan became First Lady of the United States in January 1981, following her husband's victory in the 1980 presidential election. Early in his first term, she was criticized largely due to her decisions both to replace the White House china, which had been paid for by private donations, and to accept free clothing from fashion designers. She championed opposition to recreational drug use when she founded the "Just Say No" drug awareness campaign, which is considered her major initiative as First Lady—although it received substantial criticism for stigmatizing poor communities affected by the crack epidemic. More discussion of her role ensued following a 1988 revelation that she had consulted an astrologer to assist in planning the president's schedule after the attempted assassination of her husband in 1981. She generally had a strong influence on her husband and played a role in a few of his personnel and diplomatic decisions.

The couple returned to their home in Bel Air, Los Angeles, California, after leaving the White House. Reagan devoted most of her time to caring for her husband, who was diagnosed with Alzheimer's disease in 1994, until his death at the age of 93 on June 5, 2004. Reagan remained active within the Reagan Library and in politics, particularly in support of embryonic stem cell research, until her death from congestive heart failure at the age of 94 in 2016. She gained high approval ratings in later life for her devotion to her husband in his final illness.

== Early life and education ==
Anne Frances Robbins was born in Manhattan on July 6, 1921, but throughout her life she told others she was born in 1923. Her parents were used car salesman Kenneth Robbins and actress Edith Luckett. The actress Alla Nazimova was her godmother. She was named Anne after her great-great-great-grandmother, but her mother took to calling her "Nancy" until that became the name she was known by. Robbins lived her first two years in Flushing, a neighborhood in Queens, in a two-story house on Roosevelt Avenue between 149th and 150th Streets.

Robbins' parents split in 1923 when her mother decided to return to acting and the couple could not agree on where to live. Her father removed himself from her life, and her mother resumed work as a stage actress. Robbins was placed with her mother's sister, Virginia Galbraith, in Bethesda, Maryland, along with her uncle and cousin. She attended Sidwell Friends School in Washington, D.C. Robbins missed her mother while living with her aunt, and they made trips to New York so she could see her mother perform on stage. She emulated her mother by wearing makeup and pretending to be an actress. Robbins' parents finalized their divorce in 1928. Later analysis of her life has focused on this unstable family environment as a reason why she held marriage as a life goal.

Robbins's mother remarried in 1929, giving her a stepfather at age seven. Loyal Davis was a neurosurgeon, and the family moved to Chicago together where she formed a close bond with her stepfather. She would always refer to him as her father. She also had a stepbrother but did not develop a close relationship with him. She attended Girls' Latin School in Chicago, where she involved in Drama Club, field hockey, and student government. In her senior year, she had the lead role in the school play First Lady.

Having a wealthy neurosurgeon as a stepfather meant a comfortable childhood where Robbins lived beyond the means of most Americans, and the family socialized in high society. Her mother's career also meant that Robbins had regular interactions with famous actors of the day, especially with their family friends Katharine Hepburn, Walter Huston, and Spencer Tracy. Her stepfather's conservative beliefs were a strong influence on her own politics.

Robbins was adopted by her stepfather at age fourteen, and she changed her legal name to Nancy Davis. In 1939, Davis left Girls' Latin School and began attending Smith College in Northampton, Massachusetts, where she studied English and drama. Among her instructors was Federal Theatre Project director Hallie Flanagan. Davis was a debutante that December, where she met Frank Birney, who kept introducing himself to her under different names to make her comfortable. They were eventually engaged, but he was struck by a train and killed before they were married.

Davis graduated from Smith College in 1943. She took a job as a sales clerk at Marshall Field's in Chicago, but she left the job before long and volunteered as a nurse's aide.

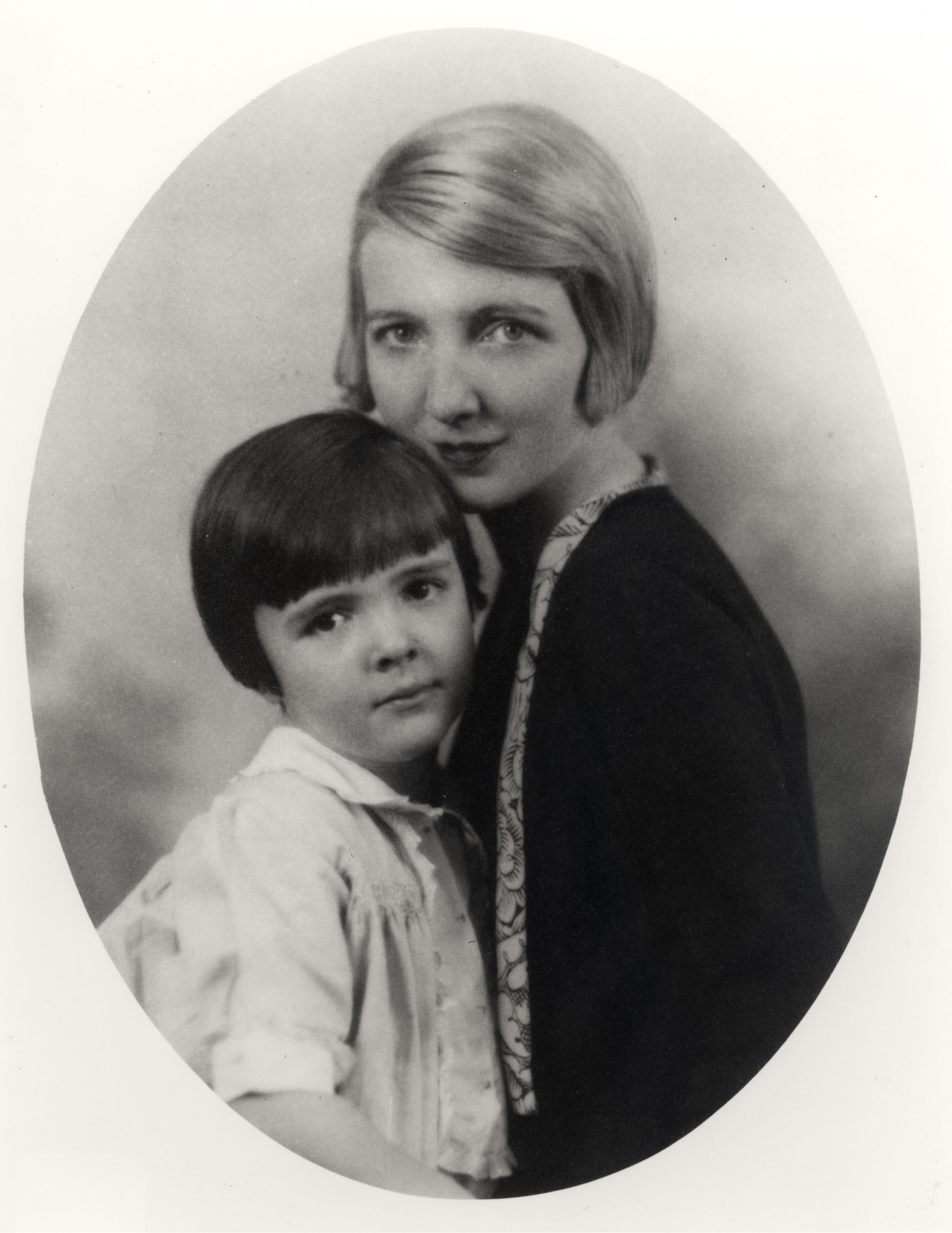
Young Nancy with her mother, actress Edith Luckett

== Acting career ==
Davis moved to New York to work as an actress and model under the tutelage of Walter Huston and Spencer Tracy. This began when family friend ZaSu Pitts got her a role in the play Ramshackle Inn on Broadway in 1945. She had a total of three lines. Although the play closed soon after, she followed it with a role in Lute Song. Davis dated Clark Gable for one week, which brought her a higher public profile.

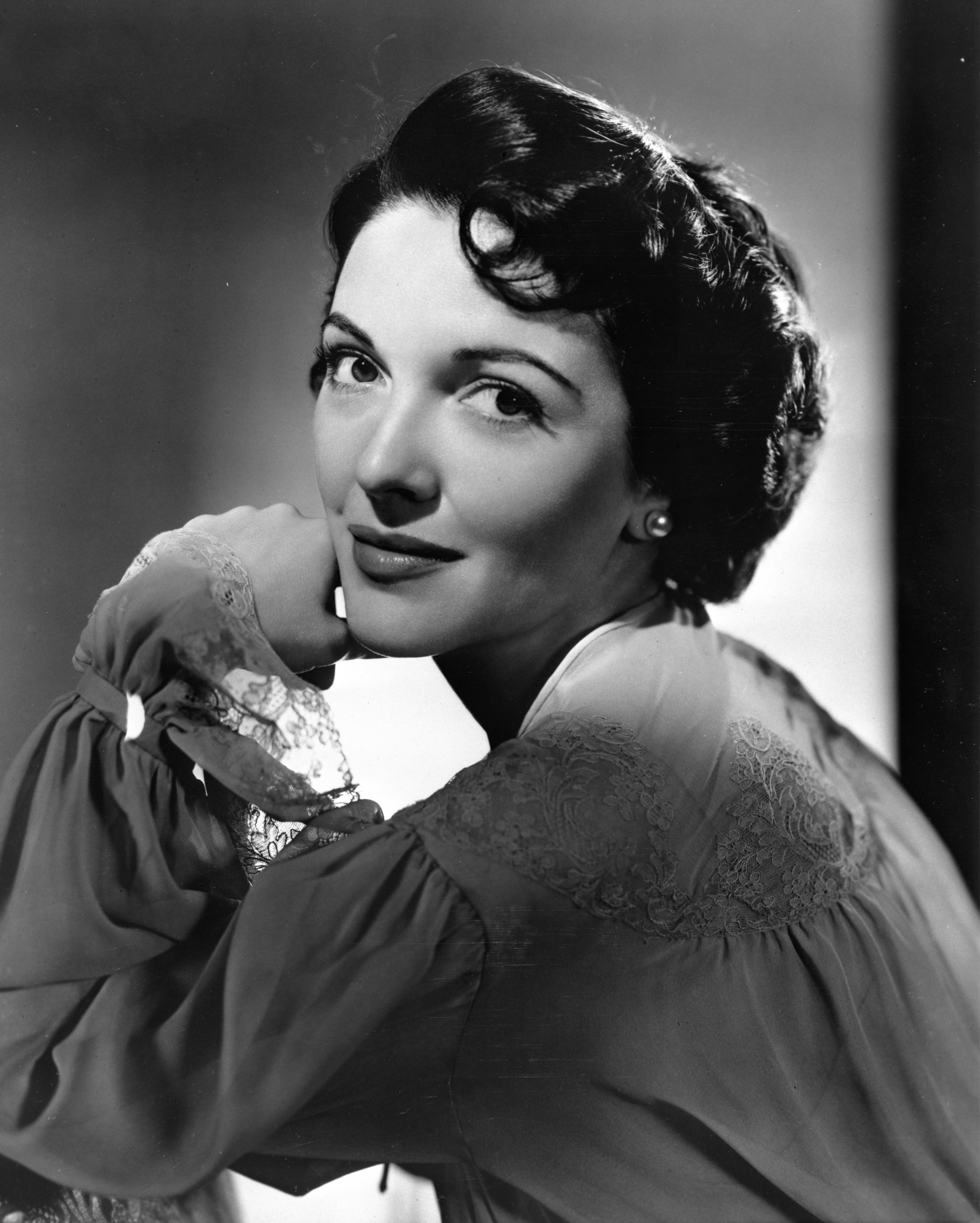
Davis, c. 1949–50

In 1940, a young Davis had appeared as a National Foundation for Infantile Paralysis volunteer in a short subject film shown in movie theaters to raise donations for the crusade against polio. The Crippler featured a sinister figure spreading over playgrounds and farms, laughing over its victims, until finally dispelled by the volunteer. It was effective in raising contributions.

She landed the role of Si-Tchun, a lady-in-waiting, in the 1946 Broadway musical about the Orient, Lute Song, starring Mary Martin and a pre-fame Yul Brynner. The show's producer told her, "You look like you could be Chinese."

Davis in 1950

Davis went to Hollywood in 1949 when Metro-Goldwyn-Mayer asked her to participate in a screen test. Her mother worked with Tracy to get director George Cukor to evaluate the test. They gave her a seven-year contract and was paid $250 (equivalent to $3,383 in 2025) per week. She went on to appear in eleven films, including The Doctor and the Girl (1949), East Side, West Side (1949), Night into Morning (1951), It's a Big Country (1951), and Donovan's Brain (1953). She was generally well-received but did not achieve mainstream success. These appearances generally typecast her as a wife and mother.

Davis played a child psychiatrist in the film noir Shadow on the Wall (1950) with Ann Sothern and Zachary Scott; her performance was called "beautiful and convincing" by New York Times critic A. H. Weiler. She co-starred in 1950's The Next Voice You Hear..., playing a pregnant housewife who hears the voice of God from her radio. Influential reviewer Bosley Crowther of The New York Times wrote that "Nancy Davis [is] delightful as [a] gentle, plain, and understanding wife." MGM released Davis from her contract in 1952; she sought a broader range of parts, but also married Reagan, keeping her professional name as Davis, and had her first child that year. She soon starred in the science fiction film Donovan's Brain (1953); Crowther said that Davis, playing the role of a possessed scientist's "sadly baffled wife", "walked through it all in stark confusion" in an "utterly silly" film. In her next-to-last movie, Hellcats of the Navy (1957), she played nurse Lieutenant Helen Blair, and appeared in a film for the only time with her husband, playing what one critic called "a housewife who came along for the ride". Another reviewer, however, stated that Davis plays her part satisfactorily, and "does well with what she has to work with".

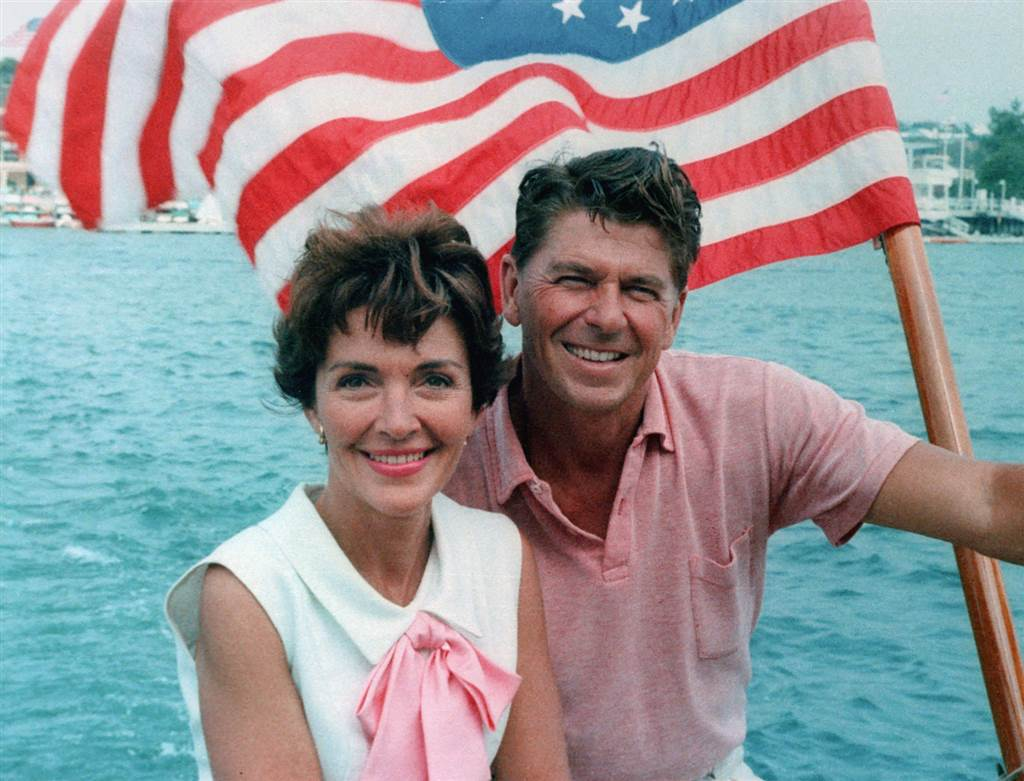
Nancy and Ronald Reagan aboard a boat, 1964

Author Garry Wills has said that Davis was generally underrated as an actress because her constrained part in Hellcats was her most widely seen performance. In addition, Davis downplayed her Hollywood goals: promotional material from MGM in 1949 said that her "greatest ambition" was to have a "successful happy marriage"; decades later, in 1975, she would say, "I was never really a career woman but [became one] only because I hadn't found the man I wanted to marry. I couldn't sit around and do nothing, so I became an actress." Ronald Reagan biographer Lou Cannon nevertheless characterized her as a "reliable" and "solid" performer who held her own in performances with better-known actors. After her final film, Crash Landing (1958), Davis appeared for a brief time as a guest star in television dramas, such as the Zane Grey Theatre episode "The Long Shadow" (1961), where she played opposite Ronald Reagan, as well as Wagon Train and The Tall Man, until she retired as an actress in 1962.

During her career, Davis served for nearly ten years on the board of directors of the Screen Actors Guild. Decades later, Albert Brooks attempted to coax her out of acting retirement by offering her the title role opposite himself in his 1996 film Mother. She declined in order to care for her husband, and Debbie Reynolds played the part.

== Marriage and family ==
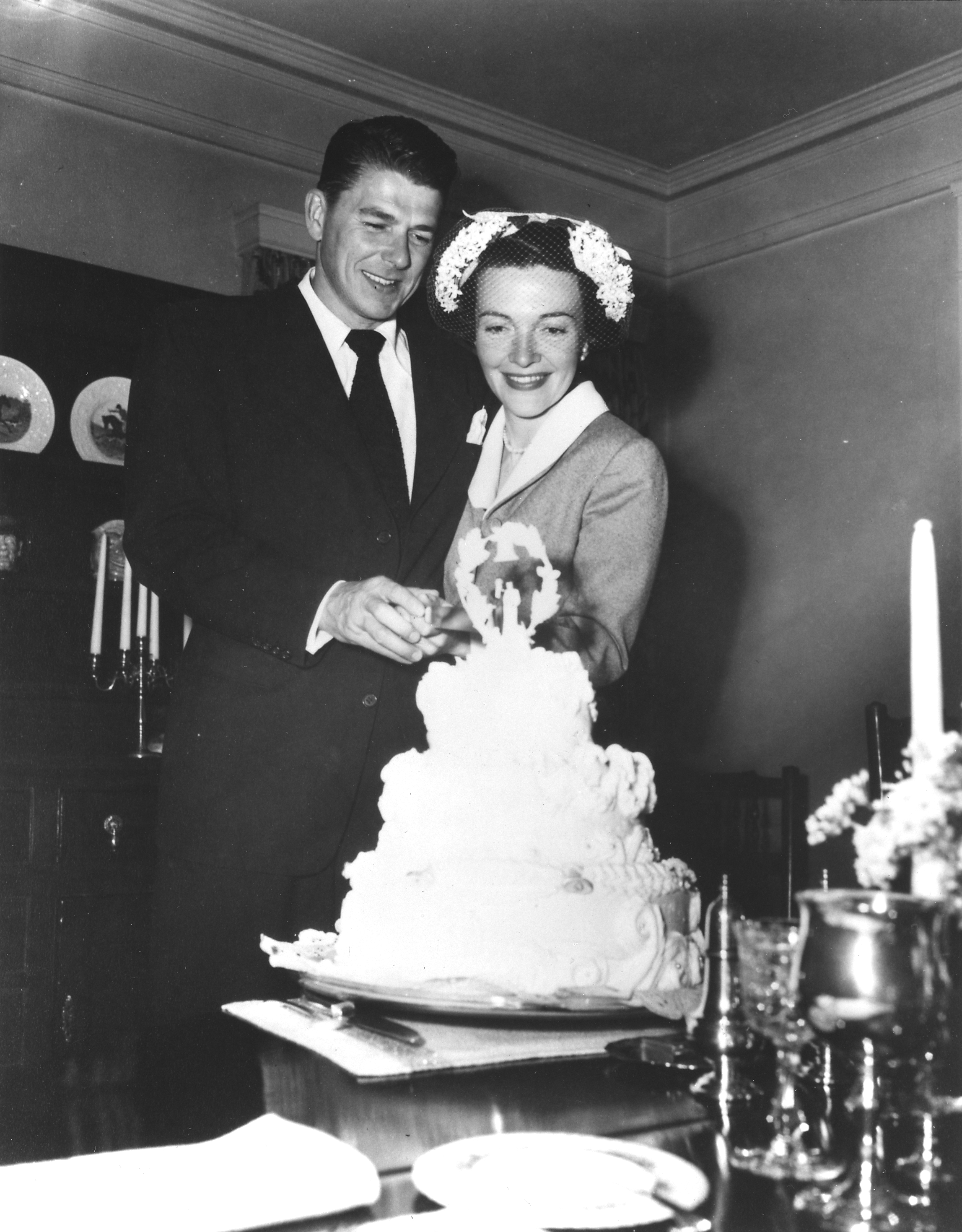
Newlyweds Ronald and Nancy Reagan, March 4, 1952

During her Hollywood career, Davis dated many actors, including Clark Gable, Robert Stack, and Peter Lawford; she later called Gable the nicest of the stars she had met.

Davis met the president of the Screen Actors Guild, Ronald Reagan, on November 15, 1949. According to Davis, she had the meeting arranged after she discovered her name was on the Hollywood blacklist. They met for dinner where he explained that she was being confused with another Nancy Davis. The exact nature of their meeting has been disputed, with some biographers arguing that she was already well-connected enough to address the issue or that they had met in other circumstances entirely. She later said that meeting him was the moment her life began. Although Ronald was hesitant to begin a relationship following his divorce from Jane Wyman, he started dating Davis. They were not exclusive at first, and Ronald continued seeing other women in the early period of their relationship. Their relationship was the subject of many gossip columns; one Hollywood press account described their nightclub-free times together as "the romance of a couple who have no vices".

Both of the Reagans had experiences with frequent moving and instability during their childhoods and strained relationships with their fathers. They were contrasted by their personalities, as Ronald was an optimist while Nancy was a pessimist. Ronald's gregariousness and his status as a self-made man are cited as reasons for Nancy's attraction to him. There's disagreement among historians as to whether Nancy or Ronald influenced the other in a rightward political shift, or whether they both already held strong conservative political views when they met.

After three years of dating, they eventually decided to marry while discussing the issue in the couple's favorite booth at Chasen's, a restaurant in Beverly Hills.

Ronald and Nancy Reagan married in Los Angeles on March 4, 1952. William Holden and Brenda Marshall were the only wedding guests. Upon their marriage, Ronald's children Maureen (1941-2001) and Michael (1945-2026) became Nancy's stepchildren. They honeymooned in Phoenix, Arizona.

After their marriage, Ronald began working as a traveling spokesman for General Electric and host of the General Electric Theater drama series. Though Nancy occasionally traveled with Ronald and acted in General Electric Theater, they spent large amounts of time apart as she tended to their children. Nancy had her daughter Patti on October 22, 1952, and her son Ron on May 20, 1958. Ronald's success meant they were able to buy a home in the Pacific Palisades, Los Angeles, where she bonded with other wives of influential men, including Betsy Bloomingdale, Marion Jorgensen, and Mary Jane Wick. Nancy spent much of her time raising the children, and she served on the school board. She appeared in two more films during this period, Hellcats of the Navy (1957) and Crash Landing (1958), as well as some appearances on television shows. She officially retired from acting in 1962.

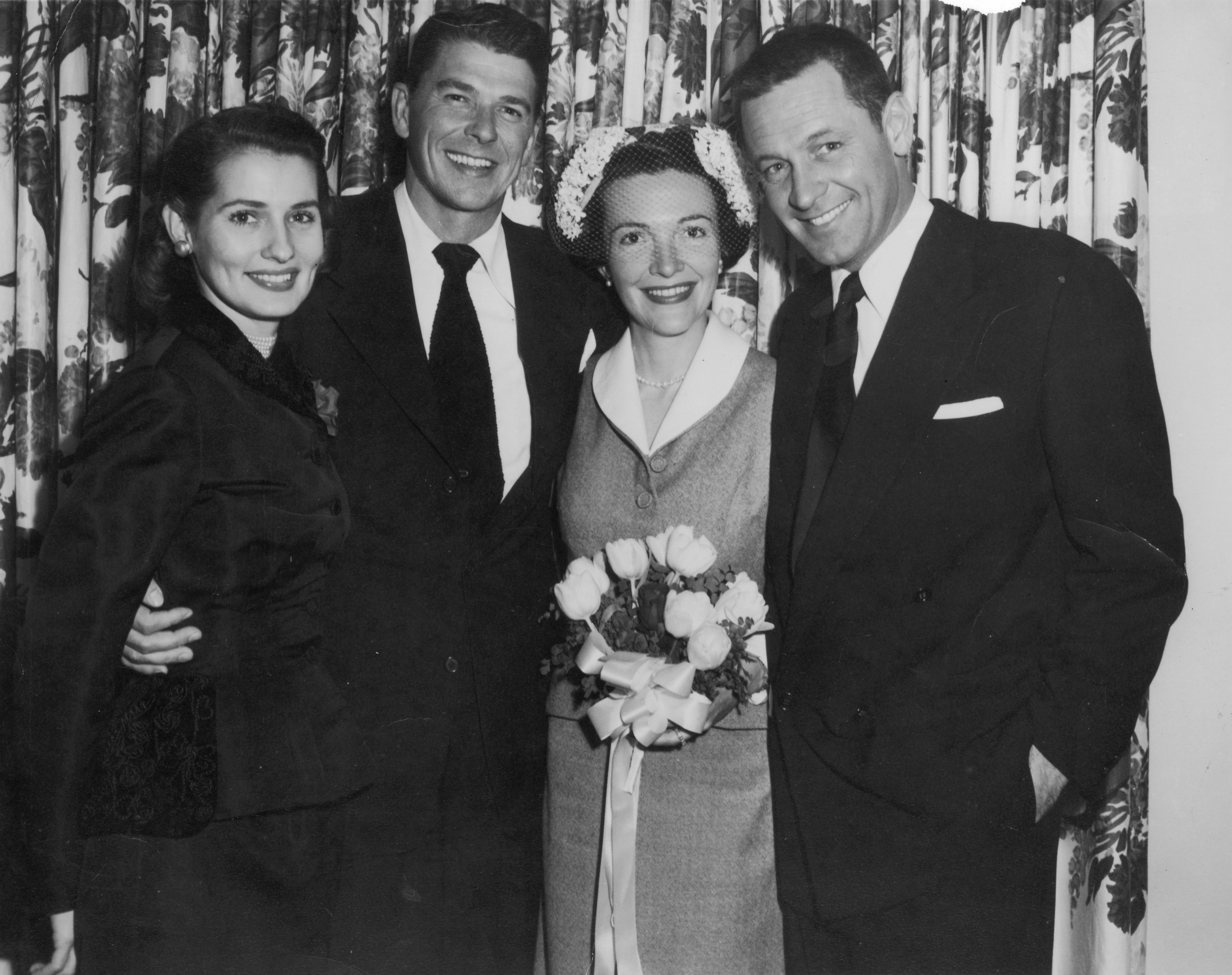
Matron of honor Brenda Marshall and best man William Holden, sole guests at the Reagans' wedding, flank the newlywed couple

The Reagans' relationships with their children grew strained as they dedicated more of their time to politics. They also did not know how to handle their children's sympathy toward the counterculture of the 1960s.

Observers described Nancy and Ronald's relationship as intimate. As president and first lady, the Reagans were reported to display their affection frequently, with one press secretary noting, "They never took each other for granted. They never stopped courting." Ronald often called Nancy "Mommy"; she called him "Ronnie". While the president was recuperating in the hospital after the 1981 assassination attempt, Nancy wrote in her diary, "Nothing can happen to my Ronnie. My life would be over." In a letter to Nancy, Ronald wrote, "whatever I treasure and enjoy ... all would be without meaning if I didn't have you." In 1998, a few years after her husband had been given a diagnosis of Alzheimer's disease, Nancy told Vanity Fair, "Our relationship is very special. We were very much in love and still are. When I say my life began with Ronnie, well, it's true. It did. I can't imagine life without him." Nancy was known for the focused and attentive look, termed "the Gaze", that she fastened upon her husband during his speeches and appearances.

President Reagan's death in June 2004 ended what Charlton Heston called "the greatest love affair in the history of the American Presidency".

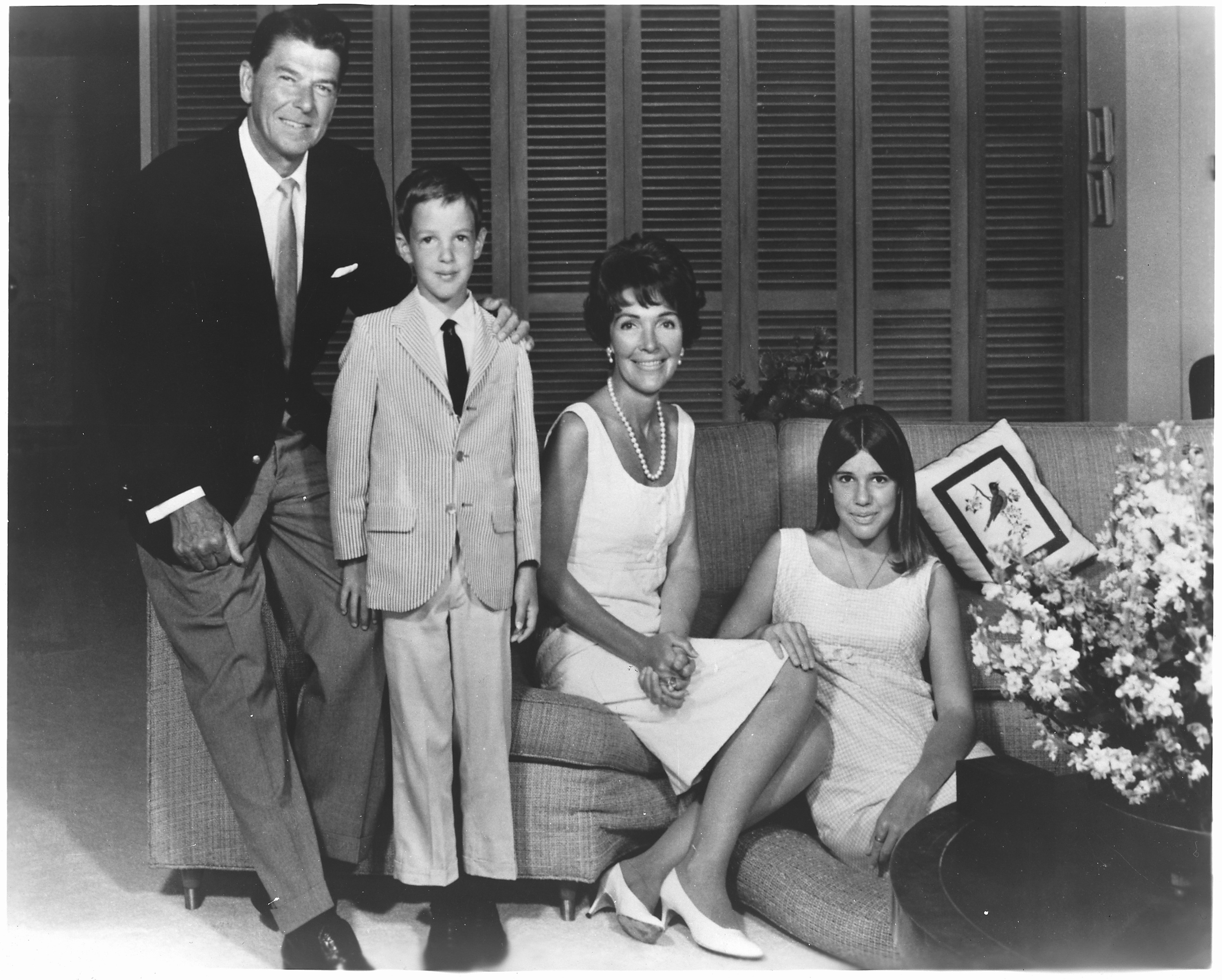
The Reagan family, c. 1967

Nancy frequently quarreled with her biological children and her stepchildren, and was estranged from all of them at various points, as was Ronald. Her relationship with Patti was the most contentious; Patti flouted American conservatism, rebelled against her parents by joining the nuclear freeze movement, and authored many anti-Reagan books. Patti became estranged from her parents. Soon after her father's Alzheimer's disease was diagnosed, Patti and her mother reconciled and began to speak on a daily basis. Nancy's disagreements with Michael were also public matters; in 1984, she was quoted as saying that the two were in an "estrangement right now". Michael responded that Nancy was trying to cover up for the fact she had not met his daughter, Ashley, who had been born nearly a year earlier. They too eventually made peace. Nancy was thought to be "closest" to her stepdaughter Maureen during the White House years, but earned a reputation for being a poor mother.

== First Lady of California (1967–1975) ==
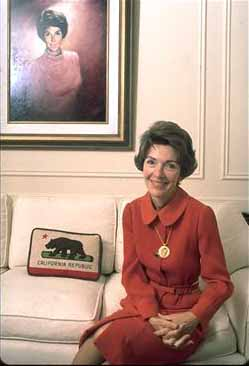
Reagan as the first lady of California

Nancy Reagan became First Lady of California when Ronald Reagan took office as Governor in 1967. She was surprised by his desire to hold elected office and was hesitant to participate in campaigning, but nonetheless made stops on his behalf and answered questions from voters. She eventually found the experience to be enjoyable, albeit "tiring".

Upon becoming first lady of California, Nancy criticized the Governor's Mansion, feeling it was unfit for a family. They instead moved to a rented home in the state's capital Sacramento. Although the Governor's Mansion was officially deemed a fire hazard, her reaction was seen as snobbish by her critics. She disliked living in the state capital of Sacramento, which lacked the excitement, social life, and mild climate to which she was accustomed in Los Angeles. Her redecoration of the California State Capitol was received more positively.

Nancy was a socialite in California, making appearances at major events and shopping in the wealthy neighborhood of Beverly Hills. At the same time, she had to acclimate to the political attacks against her husband and her family, which offended her more than him. She held her first press conference when she was accused of taking donations to the governor's home for her own personal use. On June 6, 1968, Nancy was the subject of a biographical profile titled "Pretty Nancy" following an interview with Joan Didion; Didion was deeply critical in her publication, portraying Nancy as out-of-touch and insincere. To vent her frustration, Nancy began having imaginary arguments while she was in the bath.

In 1967, Ronald appointed Nancy to the California Arts Commission, and a year later she was named Los Angeles Times Woman of the Year; in its profile, the Times labeled her "A Model First Lady".

Nancy did not know that her husband intended to seek the presidential nomination at the 1968 Republican National Convention until after he did so.

Nancy worked with the Foster Grandparents Program that brought the elderly to work with special needs children. She had the program expanded in California and facilitated the creation of another such program in Australia. She later expanded her work with the organization after arriving in Washington, and wrote about her experiences in her 1982 book To Love a Child. Nancy also spent time with people in veterans' hospitals and the families of prisoners of war in Vietnam. Additionally, she was a member of the Junior League of Los Angeles, CA.

The Reagans purchased Rancho del Cielo, a vacation home in Santa Barbara, California, in 1974. Nancy's tenure as first lady of California ended in 1975 when her husband left office, and she was relieved to be out of public life.

== Role in 1976 and 1980 presidential campaigns ==
Governor Reagan's gubernatorial time in office ended in 1975, and he did not run for a third term; instead, he met with advisors to discuss a possible bid for the 1976 presidency, challenging incumbent president Gerald Ford. Ronald still needed to convince a reluctant Nancy before running, however. She feared for her husband's health and his career as a whole, though she felt that he was the right man for the job and approved eventually. Nancy took on a traditional role in the campaign, holding coffees, luncheons, and talks. She also oversaw personnel, monitored her husband's schedule, and occasionally provided press conferences. The 1976 campaign included the so-called "battle of the queens", contrasting Nancy with First Lady Betty Ford. They both spoke out over the course of the campaign on similar issues, but with different approaches. Nancy was upset by the warmonger image that the Ford campaign had drawn of her husband.

Though he lost the 1976 Republican nomination, Ronald Reagan ran for the presidency a second time in 1980. He succeeded in winning the nomination and defeated incumbent rival Jimmy Carter in a landslide. During this second campaign, Nancy played a prominent role, and her management of staff became more apparent. She organized a meeting among feuding campaign managers John Sears and Michael Deaver and her husband, which resulted in Deaver leaving the campaign and Sears being given full control. After the Reagan camp lost the Iowa Caucus and fell behind in New Hampshire polls, Nancy organized a second meeting and decided it was time to fire Sears and his associates; she gave Sears a copy of the press release announcing his dismissal. Her influence on her husband became particularly notable; her presence at rallies, luncheons, and receptions increased his confidence.

== First Lady of the United States (1981–1989) ==
=== White House glamour ===
==== Renovation ====
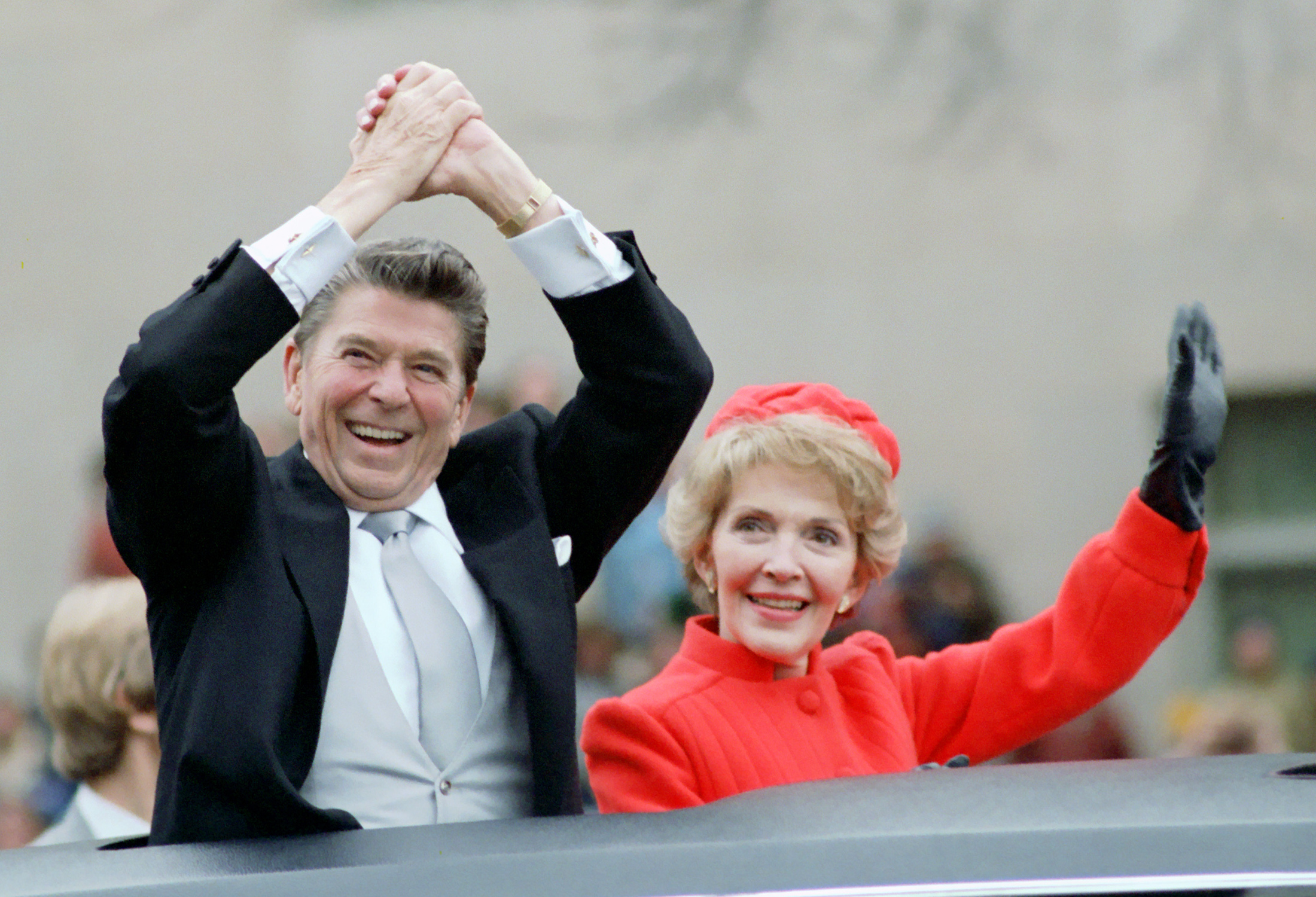
The new president and his wife wave to the crowd during the Inaugural Parade, January 20, 1981, the same day that 52 Americans held hostage by Iran for 444 days were set free

Reagan became the first lady of the United States when Ronald Reagan was inaugurated as president in January 1981. Early in her husband's presidency, Reagan stated her desire to create a more suitable "first home" in the White House, as the building had fallen into a state of disrepair following years of neglect. White House aide Michael Deaver described the second and third-floor family residence as having "cracked plaster walls, chipped paint [and] beaten up floors"; Rather than use government funds to renovate and redecorate, she sought private donations. In 1981, Reagan directed a major renovation of several White House rooms, including all of the second and third floors and rooms adjacent to the Oval Office, including the press briefing room. The renovation included repainting walls, refinishing floors, repairing fireplaces, and replacing antique pipes, windows, and wires. The closet in the master bedroom was converted into a beauty parlor and dressing room, and the West bedroom was made into a small gymnasium.

Official portrait of the First Lady in the Red Room, 1981

The First Lady secured the assistance of renowned interior designer Ted Graber, popular with affluent West Coast social figures, to redecorate the family living quarters. A Chinese-pattern, handpainted wallpaper was added to the master bedroom. Family furniture was placed in the president's private study. The first lady and her designer retrieved several White House antiques, which had been in storage, and placed them throughout the mansion. In addition, many of Reagan's collectibles were put out for display, including around twenty-five Limoges Boxes, as well as some porcelain eggs and a collection of plates.

The extensive redecoration was paid for by private donations. Many significant and long-lasting changes occurred as a result of the renovation and refurbishment, of which Reagan said, "This house belongs to all Americans, and I want it to be something of which they can be proud." The renovations received some criticisms for being funded by tax-deductible donations, meaning some of it eventually did indirectly come from the tax-paying public.

==== Fashion ====
Reagan's interest in fashion was another one of her trademarks. While her husband was still president-elect, press reports speculated about Reagan's social life and interest in fashion. In many press accounts, Reagan's sense of style was favorably compared to that of a previous first lady, Jacqueline Kennedy. Friends and those close to her remarked that, while fashionable like Kennedy, she would be different from other first ladies; close friend Harriet Deutsch was quoted as saying, "Nancy has her own imprint."

White House photographer Mary Anne Fackelman-Miner, who was assigned to Reagan, said of her, "She always photographed so easily and was at ease in front of the cameras."

Reagan's wardrobe consisted of dresses, gowns, and suits made by luxury designers, including James Galanos, Bill Blass, and Oscar de la Renta. Her white, hand-beaded, one shoulder Galanos 1981 inaugural gown was estimated to cost $10,000, while the overall price of her inaugural wardrobe was said to cost $25,000. She favored the color red, calling it "a picker-upper", and wore it accordingly. Her wardrobe included red so often that the fire-engine shade became known as "Reagan red". She employed two private hairdressers, who would style her hair on a regular basis in the White House.

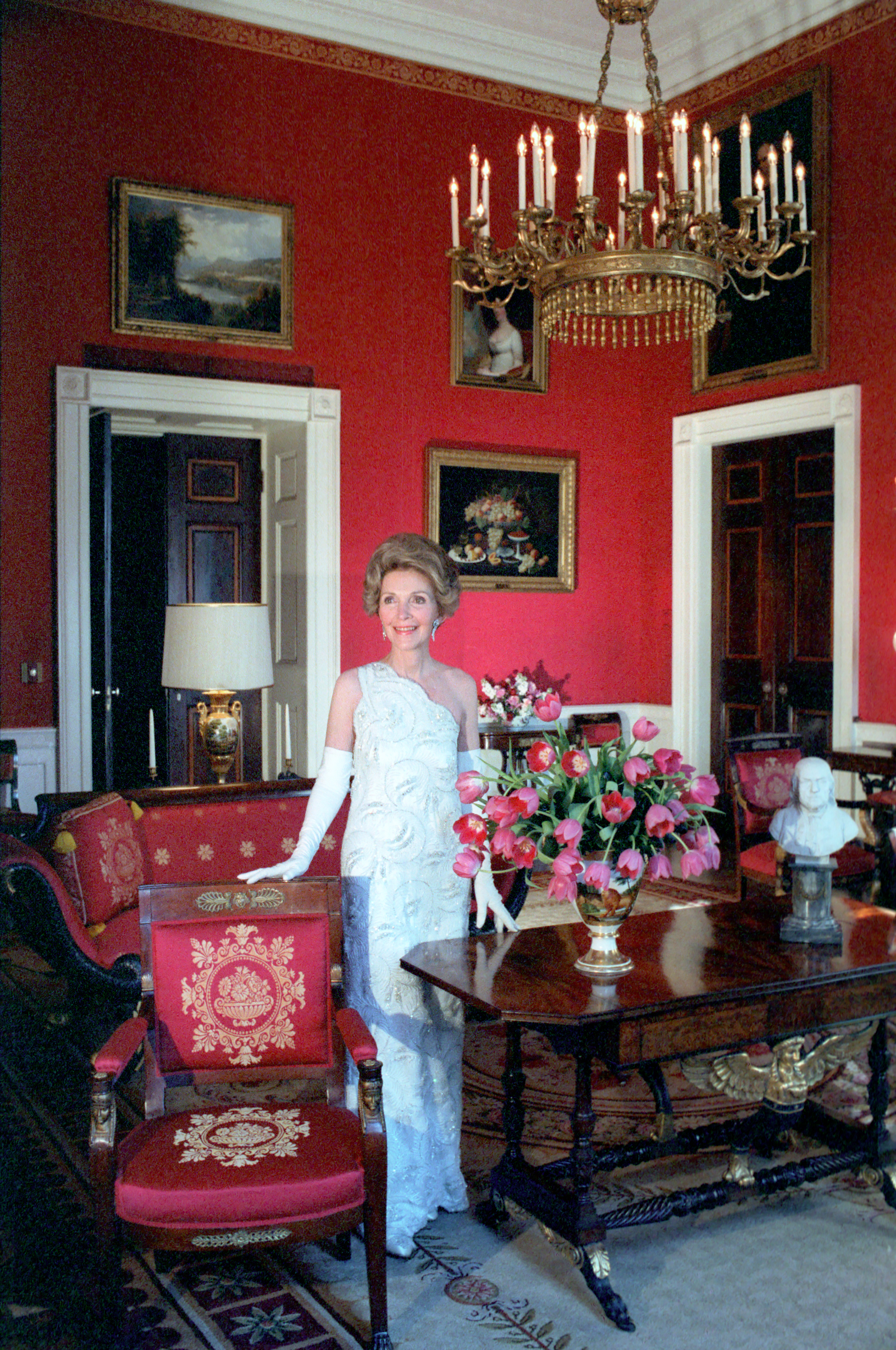
Reagan models for Vogue in the Red Room, 1981

Fashion designers were pleased with the emphasis Reagan placed on clothing. Adolfo said the first lady embodied an "elegant, affluent, well-bred, chic American look", while Bill Blass commented, "I don't think there's been anyone in the White House since Jacqueline Kennedy Onassis who has her flair." William Fine, president of cosmetic company Frances Denney, noted that she "stays in style, but she doesn't become trendy."

Though her elegant fashions and wardrobe were hailed as a "glamorous paragon of chic", they were also controversial subjects. In 1982, she revealed that she had accepted thousands of dollars in clothing, jewelry, and other gifts, but defended her actions by stating that she had borrowed the clothes and that they would either be returned or donated to museums, and that she was promoting the American fashion industry. Facing criticism, she soon said she would no longer accept such loans. While often buying her clothes, she continued to borrow and sometimes keep designer clothes throughout her time as first lady, which came to light in 1988. None of this had been included on financial disclosure forms; the non-reporting of loans under $10,000 in liability was in violation of a voluntary agreement the White House had made in 1982, while not reporting more valuable loans or clothes not returned was a possible violation of the Ethics in Government Act. Reagan expressed through her press secretary "regrets that she failed to heed counsel's advice" on disclosing them.

Despite the controversy, many designers who allowed her to borrow clothing, noted that the arrangement was good for their businesses, as well as for the American fashion industry overall. In 1989, Reagan was honored at the annual gala awards dinner of the Council of Fashion Designers of America, during which she received the council's lifetime achievement award. Barbara Walters said of her, "She has served every day for eight long years the word 'style.'"

==== Extravagance ====
Approximately a year into her husband's first term, Nancy explored the idea of ordering new state china service for the White House. A full china service had not been purchased since the Truman administration in the 1940s, as only a partial service was ordered in the Johnson administration. She was quoted as saying, "The White House really badly, badly needs china." Working with Lenox, the primary porcelain manufacturer in America, the first lady chose a design scheme of a red with etched gold band, bordering the scarlet and cream colored ivory plates with a raised presidential seal etched in gold in the center. The full service comprised 4,370 pieces, with 19 pieces per individual set. The service totaled $209,508. Although it was paid for by private donations, some from the private J. P. Knapp Foundation, the purchase generated quite a controversy, for it was ordered at a time when the nation was undergoing an economic recession. Furthermore, news of the china purchase emerged at the same time that her husband's administration had proposed school lunch regulations that would allow ketchup to be counted as a vegetable.

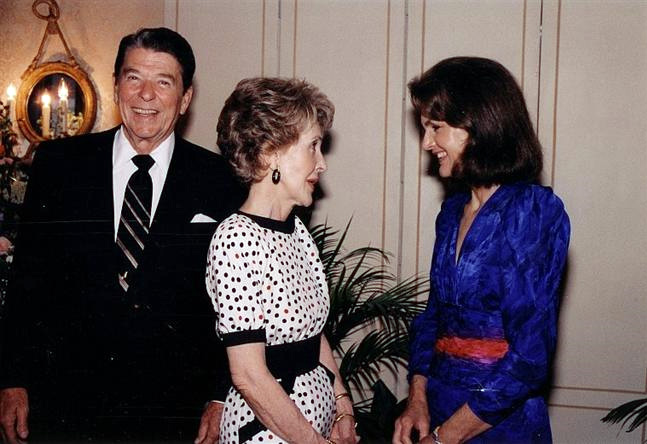
President Reagan, First Lady Nancy Reagan and former first lady Jacqueline Kennedy Onassis at a fundraiser for the Kennedy Presidential Library, 1985

The new china set, White House renovations, expensive clothing, and her attendance at the wedding of Charles and Diana, Prince and Princess of Wales, gave her an aura of being "out of touch" with the American people during the recession. This built upon the reputation she had coming to Washington, wherein many people concluded that Reagan was a vain and shallow woman, and her taste for splendor inspired the derogatory nickname "Queen Nancy". While Jacqueline Kennedy had also faced some press criticism for her spending habits, Reagan's treatment was much more consistent and negative. In an attempt to deflect the criticism, she self-deprecatingly donned a baglady costume at the 1982 Gridiron Dinner and sang "Second-Hand Clothes", mimicking the song "Second-Hand Rose". The skit helped to restore her reputation.

Reagan reflected on the criticisms in her 1989 autobiography, My Turn. She described lunching with former Democratic National Committee chairman Robert S. Strauss, wherein Strauss said to her, "When you first came to town, Nancy, I didn't like you at all. But after I got to know you, I changed my mind and said, 'She's some broad!'" Reagan responded, "Bob, based on the press reports I read then, I wouldn't have liked me either!"

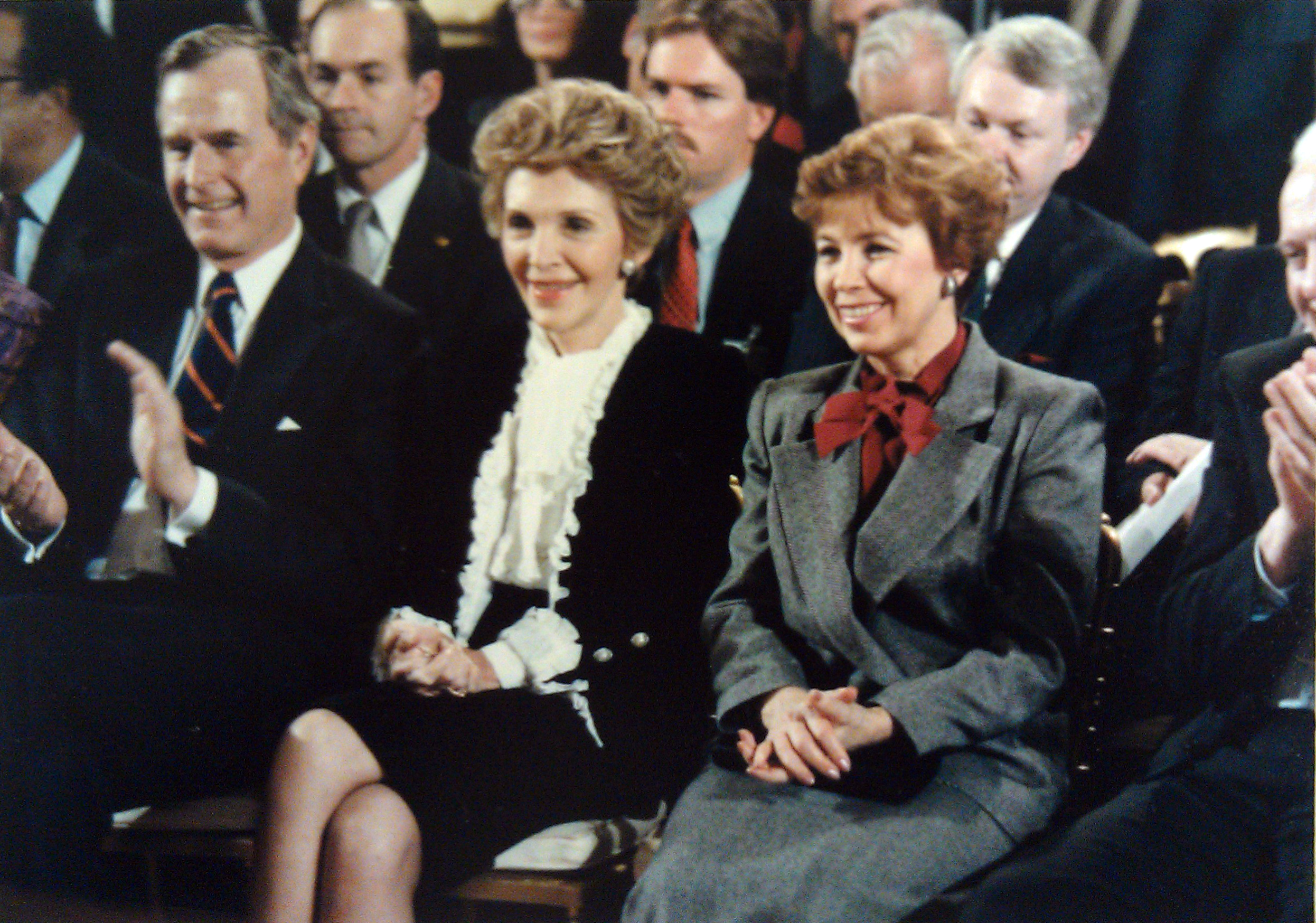
Vice President George H. W. Bush, Reagan, and Raisa Gorbacheva (spouse of Mikhail Gorbachev) in Washington, D.C., 1987

After the presidency of Jimmy Carter (who dramatically reduced the formality of presidential functions), Reagan brought a Kennedy-esque glamour back into the White House. She hosted 56 state dinners over eight years. She remarked that hosting the dinners is "the easiest thing in the world. You don't have to do anything. Just have a good time and do a little business. And that's the way Washington works." The White House residence staff found Reagan demanding to work for during the preparation for the state dinners, with the first lady overseeing every aspect of meal presentations, and sometimes requesting one dessert after another be prepared, before finally settling on one she approved of.

In general, the First Lady's desire for everything to appear just right in the White House led the residence staff to consider her not easy to work for, with tirades following what she perceived as mistakes. One staffer later recalled, "I remember hearing her call for her personal maid one day and it scared the dickens out of me—just her tone. I never wanted to be on the wrong side of her." She did show loyalty and respect to a number of the staff. In particular, she came to the public defense of a maid who was indicted on charges of helping to smuggle ammunition to Paraguay, providing an affidavit to the maid's good character (even though it was politically inopportune to do so at the time of the Iran–Contra affair); charges were subsequently dropped, and the maid returned to work at the White House.

In 1987, Mikhail Gorbachev became the first Soviet leader to visit Washington, D.C., since Nikita Khrushchev made the trip in 1959 at the height of the Cold War. Nancy was in charge of planning and hosting the important and highly anticipated state dinner, with the goal to impress both the Soviet leader and especially his wife Raisa Gorbacheva. After the meal, she recruited pianist Van Cliburn to play a rendition of "Moscow Nights" for the Soviet delegation, to which Mikhail and Raisa broke out into song. Secretary of State George P. Shultz later commented on the evening, saying "We felt the ice of the Cold War crumbling." Reagan concluded, "It was a perfect ending for one of the great evenings of my husband's presidency."

=== Just Say No ===
With the help of her Chief of Staff James Rosebush, the first lady launched the "Just Say No" drug awareness campaign in 1982, which was her primary project and major initiative as first lady. Reagan first became aware of the need to educate young people about drugs during a 1980 campaign stop in Daytop village, New York. She remarked in 1981 that "Understanding what drugs can do to your children, understanding peer pressure and understanding why they turn to drugs is ... the first step in solving the problem." Her campaign focused on drug education and informing the youth of the danger of drug abuse.

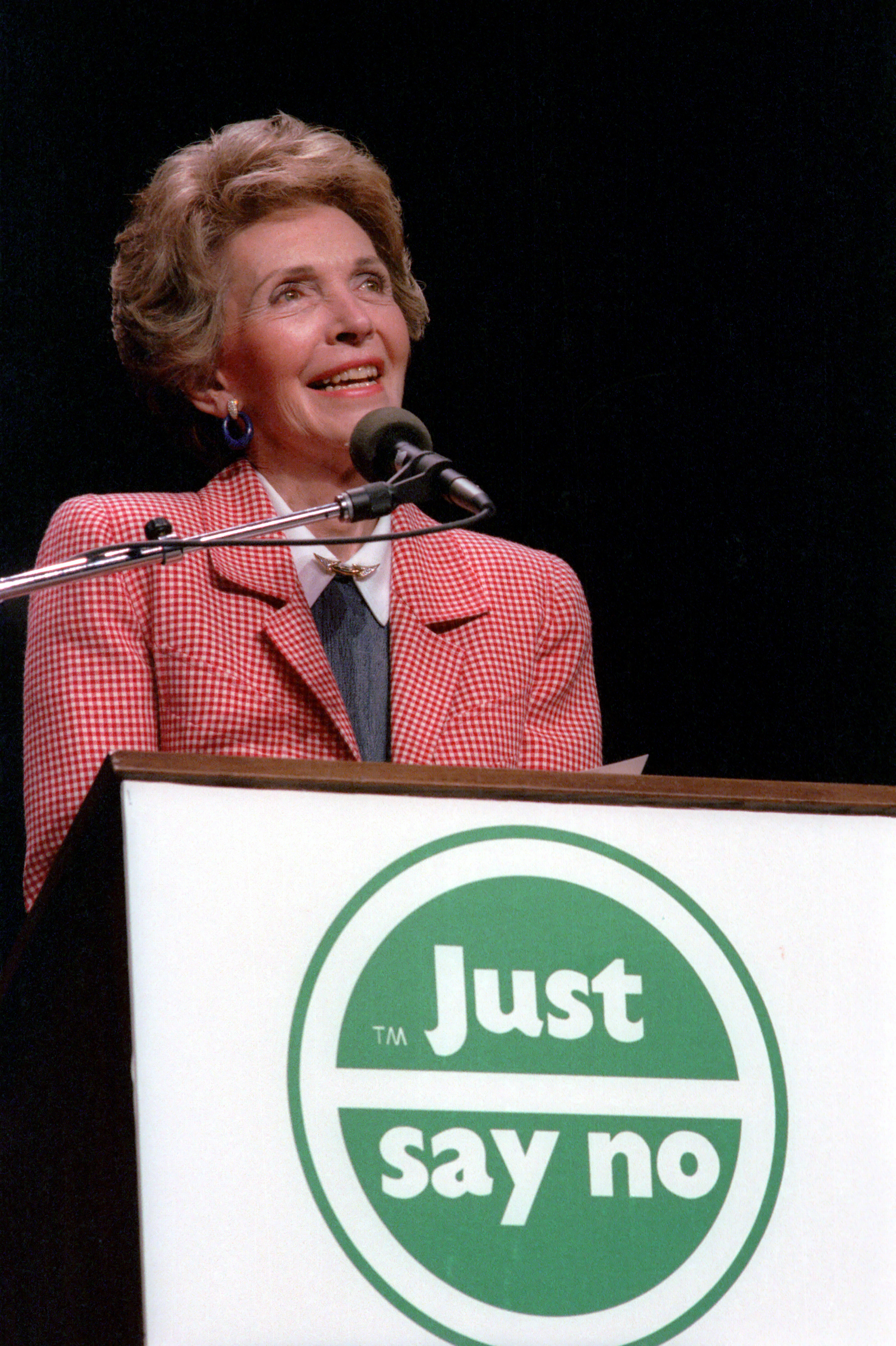
Reagan gives a speech at a "Just Say No" to drugs rally in Los Angeles, 1987

In 1982, Reagan was asked by a schoolgirl what to do when offered drugs; Reagan responded: "Just say no." The phrase proliferated in the popular culture of the 1980s, and was eventually adopted as the name of club organizations and school anti-drug programs. Reagan became actively involved by traveling more than 250,000 miles (400,000 km) throughout the United States and several nations, visiting drug abuse prevention programs and drug rehabilitation centers. She also appeared on television talk shows, recorded public service announcements, and wrote guest articles. She appeared in an episode of the sitcom Diff'rent Strokes to underscore support for the "Just Say No" campaign, and in a rock music video, "Stop the Madness" (1985).

In 1985, Reagan expanded the campaign to an international level by inviting the First Ladies of various nations to the White House for a conference on drug abuse. On October 27, 1986, President Reagan signed a drug enforcement bill into law, which granted $1.7 billion in funding to fight the perceived crisis and ensured a mandatory minimum penalty for drug offenses. Although the bill was criticized, Reagan considered it a personal victory. In 1988, she became the first active first lady invited to address the United Nations General Assembly, where she spoke on international drug interdiction and trafficking laws.

Reagan hosting the first White House Ladies Conference on Drug Abuse, 1985

Critics of Reagan's efforts questioned their purpose, labelled Reagan's approach to promoting drug awareness as simplistic, and argued that the program did not give adequate attention to various social issues associated with increased rates of drug use, including unemployment, poverty, and family dissolution.

=== Her husband's protector ===
Reagan assumed the role of unofficial "protector" for her husband after the attempted assassination of him in 1981. On March 30 of that year, President Reagan and three others were shot by the attempted assassin 25-year old John Hinckley Jr as they left the Washington Hilton hotel. Nancy was alerted and arrived at George Washington University Hospital, where the President was hospitalized. She recalled having seen "emergency rooms before, but I had never seen one like this – with my husband in it." She was escorted into a waiting room, and when granted access to see her husband, he quipped to her, "Honey, I forgot to duck", borrowing the defeated boxer Jack Dempsey's jest to his wife.

An early example of the first lady's protective nature occurred when Senator Strom Thurmond entered the president's hospital room that day in March, passing the Secret Service detail by claiming he was the President's "close friend", presumably to acquire media attention. Nancy was outraged and demanded that he leave. While the President recuperated in the hospital, the first lady slept with one of his shirts to be comforted by the scent. When Ronald Reagan was released from the hospital on April 12, she escorted him back to the White House.

Press accounts framed Reagan as her husband's "chief protector", an extension of their general initial framing of her as a helpmate and a Cold War domestic ideal. As it happened, the day after her husband was shot, she fell off a chair while trying to take down a picture to bring to him in the hospital; she suffered several broken ribs, but was determined to not reveal it publicly.

=== Astrological consultations ===
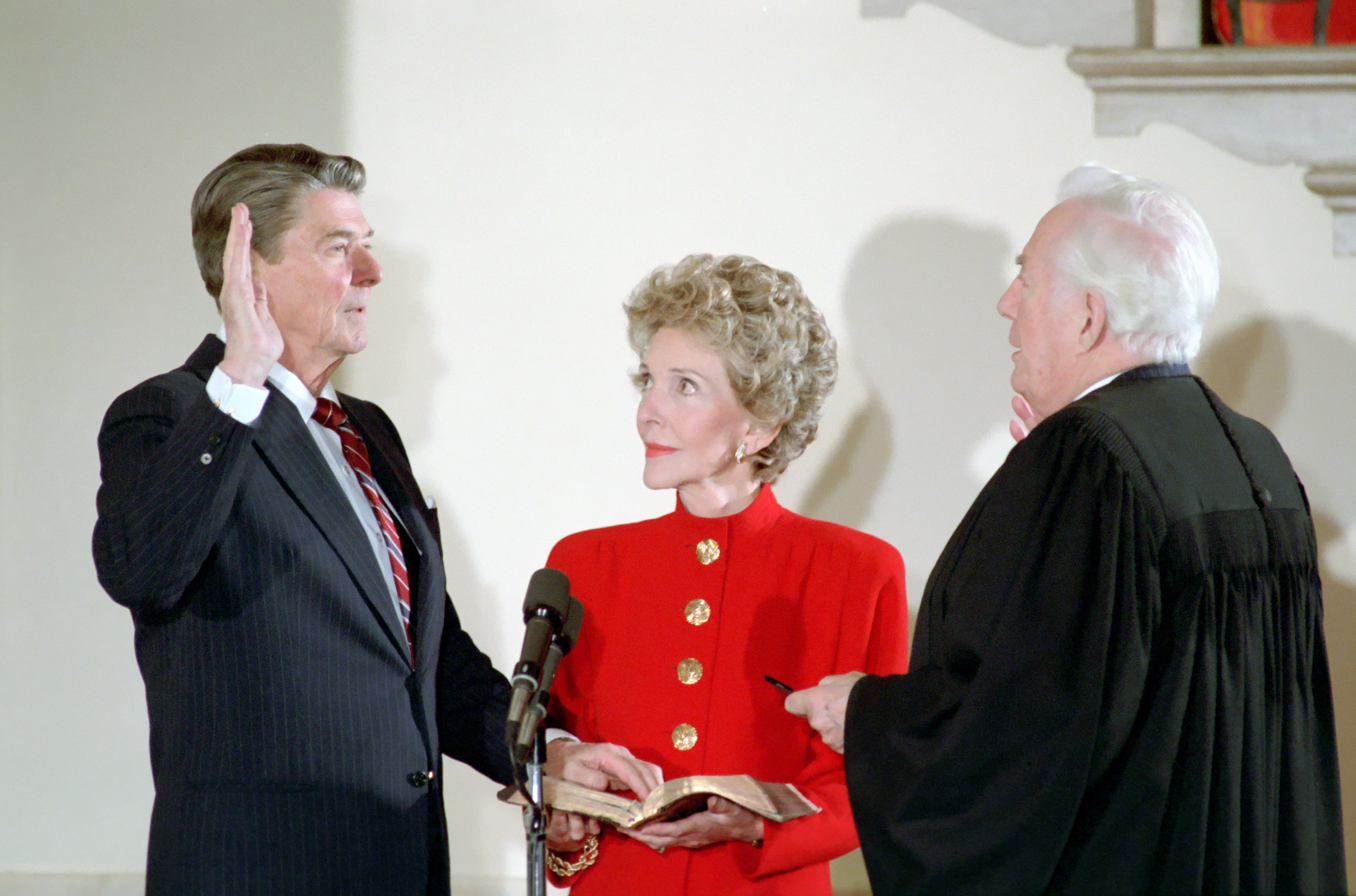
"The Gaze": Reagan watches as her husband is sworn in for a second term by Chief Justice Warren Burger, on January 20, 1985

During the Reagan administration, Nancy Reagan consulted a San Francisco astrologer, Joan Quigley, who provided advice on which days and times would be optimal for the president's safety and success. Quigley began her work at the White House after the assassination attempt on President Reagan in 1981. Nancy Reagan was told by Merv Griffin that Quigley had predicted that day would be dangerous for President Reagan, causing her to become a regular astrological consultant for the administration. Quigley previously worked on the Reagan campaign prior to serving as their astrological consultant. She volunteered for their campaign in 1980, as she was impressed by his astrological chart. Private lines were set up in the White House and Camp David to assist in phone calls between Nancy Reagan and Joan Quigley, which occurred multiple times a day, and she was paid $3,000 a month for her work.

White House chief of staff Donald Regan grew frustrated with this regimen, which created friction between him and the first lady. This friction escalated with the revelation of the Iran–Contra affair, an administration scandal, in which the first lady felt Regan was damaging the president. She thought he should resign, and expressed this to her husband, although he did not share her view. Regan wanted President Reagan to address the Iran-Contra matter in early 1987 by means of a press conference, though the first lady refused to allow her husband to overexert himself due to a recent prostate surgery and astrological warnings. She became so angry with Regan that he hung up on her during a 1987 telephone conversation. According to the recollections of ABC News correspondent Sam Donaldson, when the President heard of this treatment, he demanded—and eventually received—Regan's resignation. Vice President George H. W. Bush is also reported to have suggested to her to have Regan fired.

In his 1988 memoir, For the Record: From Wall Street to Washington, Regan wrote the following about Nancy Reagan's consultations with an astrologer:

Virtually every major move and decision the Reagans made during my time as White House Chief of Staff was cleared in advance with a woman in San Francisco [Quigley] who drew up horoscopes to make certain that the planets were in a favorable alignment for the enterprise.

Donald Regan's memoir went on to cause political discourse, as well as scrutiny of the astrological community, as he exposed the "most closely guarded secret" of the Reagan administration. Although he did not know Quigley's name at the time, he wrote extensively on her role in the White House. Regan further claimed that Quigley selected the date of the 1985 Geneva Summit. For her part, Quigley stated in 1998 that she had "'absolutely nothing'" to do with arranging the summit and added that others were "'overemphasizing'" her role; however, in 1990, she released a book in which she asserted that she was "in charge" of the President's scheduling during the Reagan administration.

Reagan acknowledged in her memoirs that she altered the President's schedule without his knowledge based on astrological advice, but argues that "no political decision was ever based [on astrology]". She added, "Astrology was simply one of the ways I coped with the fear I felt after my husband almost died ... Was astrology one of the reasons [further attempts did not occur]? I don't really believe it was, but I don't really believe it wasn't."

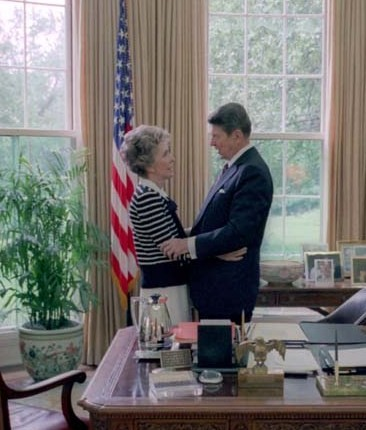
Nancy and Ronald Reagan together in the Oval Office, 1985

=== Influence in the White House ===
Nancy Reagan wielded a powerful influence over President Reagan. In her memoirs, Reagan stated, "I felt panicky every time [Ronald Reagan] left the White House". Following the assassination attempt, she strictly controlled access to the president; occasionally, she even attempted to influence her husband's decision making.

Beginning in 1985, she strongly encouraged her husband to hold "summit" conferences with Soviet general secretary Mikhail Gorbachev, and suggested they form a personal relationship beforehand. Both Ronald Reagan and Gorbachev had developed a productive relationship through their summit negotiations. The relationship between Nancy Reagan and Raisa Gorbacheva was anything but the friendly, diplomatic one between their husbands; Reagan found Gorbacheva hard to converse with and their relationship was described as "frosty". The two women usually had tea and discussed differences between the USSR and the United States. Visiting the United States for the first time in 1987, Gorbacheva irked Reagan with lectures on subjects ranging from architecture to socialism, reportedly prompting the American president's wife to quip, "Who does that dame think she is?"

Press framing of Reagan changed from that of just helpmate and protector to someone with hidden power. As the image of her as a political interloper grew, she sought to explicitly deny that she was the power behind the throne. At the end of her time as First Lady, however, she said that her husband had not been well-served by his staff. She acknowledged her role in reaction in influencing him on personnel decisions, saying "In no way do I apologize for it." She wrote in her memoirs, "I don't think I was as bad, or as extreme in my power or my weakness, as I was depicted," but went on, "However the first lady fits in, she has a unique and important role to play in looking after her husband. And it's only natural that she'll let him know what she thinks. I always did that for Ronnie, and I always will." Her chief of staff James Rosebush's 1988 book First Lady, Public Wife explored the role of the First Lady as a demanding and rigorous job.

=== Breast cancer ===
In October 1987, a mammogram detected a lesion in Reagan's left breast and she was subsequently diagnosed with breast cancer. She chose to undergo a mastectomy rather than a lumpectomy, and the breast was removed on October 17, 1987. Ten days after the operation, her 99-year-old mother, Edith Luckett Davis, died in Phoenix, Arizona, leading Reagan to dub the period "a terrible month".

After the surgery, more women across the country had mammograms, which exemplified the influence that the first lady possessed.

== Later life (1989–2016) ==
Though Reagan was a controversial first lady, 56 percent of Americans had a favorable opinion of her when her husband left office on January 20, 1989, with 18 percent having an unfavorable opinion, and the balance not giving an opinion. Compared to fellow first ladies when their husbands left office, Reagan's approval was higher than those of Rosalynn Carter, Hillary Clinton, Melania Trump, and Jill Biden. However, she was less popular than Barbara Bush, Laura Bush, and Michelle Obama, and her disapproval rating was double that of Carter's.

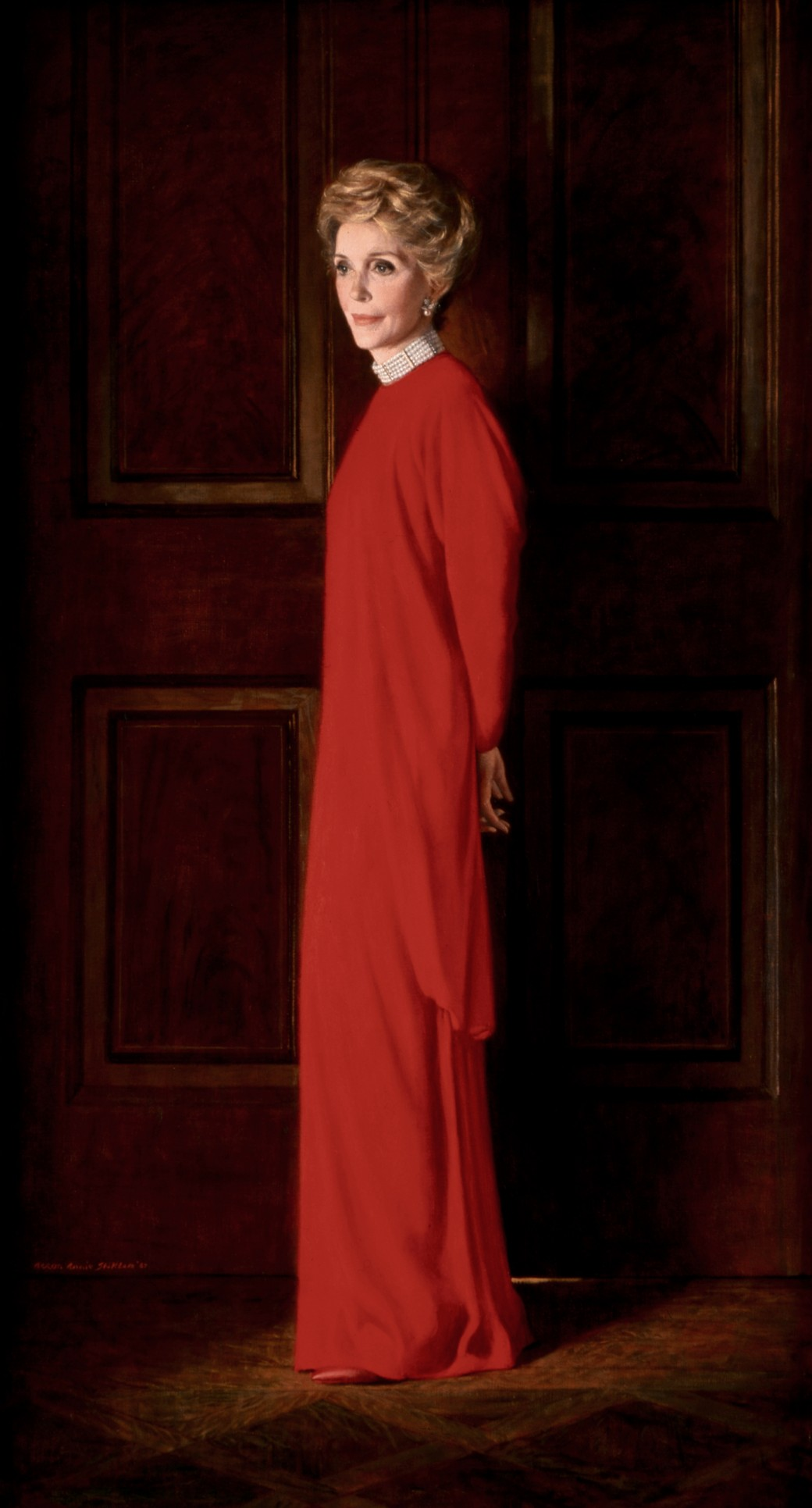
Reagan's official White House portrait by Aaron Shikler in the Vermeil Room

Upon leaving the White House, the couple returned to California, where wealthy friends purchased them a home at 668 St. Cloud Road in the wealthy East Gate Old Bel Air neighborhood of Bel Air, Los Angeles, dividing their time between Bel Air and the Reagan Ranch in Santa Barbara, California. Ronald and Nancy regularly attended the Bel Air Church as well. After leaving Washington, Reagan made numerous public appearances, many on behalf of her husband. She continued to reside at the Bel Air home, where she lived with her husband until he died on June 5, 2004.

Reagan's official White House portrait was painted by Aaron Shikler and unveiled at the White House in 1989. It depicts her in a red dress standing against the doors of the State Dining Room.

=== Early post–White House activities ===
In late 1989, the former first lady established the Nancy Reagan Foundation, which aimed to continue to educate people about the dangers of substance abuse. The Foundation teamed with the BEST Foundation For A Drug-Free Tomorrow in 1994, and developed the Nancy Reagan Afterschool Program. She continued to travel around the United States, speaking out against drug and alcohol abuse.

Her memoirs, My Turn: The Memoirs of Nancy Reagan (1989), are an account of her life in the White House, commenting openly about her influence within the Reagan administration, and discussing the myths and controversies that surrounded the couple. Responding to commentary on the book's critical tone, Reagan questioned the purpose of writing a book that was non-controversial: "There's a certain dignity in silence. But then, on the other hand, for my sake, for my children's sake, for history's sake, I just wanted there to be a more accurate picture." In 1991, the author Kitty Kelley wrote an unauthorized and largely uncited biography about Reagan, repeating accounts of a poor relationship with her children, and introducing rumors of alleged sexual relations with singer Frank Sinatra. A wide range of sources commented that Kelley's largely unsupported claims are most likely false.

In 1989, the IRS (Internal Revenue Service) began investigating the Reagans over allegations they owed additional tax on the gifts and loans of high-fashion clothes and jewellery to the first lady during their time in the White House (recipients benefiting from the display of such items recognize taxable income even if they are returned). In 1992, the IRS determined the Reagans had failed to include some $3 million worth of fashion items between 1983 and 1988 on their tax returns; they were billed for a large amount of back taxes and interest, which was subsequently paid.

In 1990, the Reagans attended the first fundraiser of the Pediatric AIDS Foundation in a West Hollywood home. The couple joined the foundation's executive advisory board and donated money and gifts for children with AIDS at a Christmas party at UCLA Medical Center.

In May 1991, the Reagans were among the dignitaries that joined Queen Elizabeth II and her husband Prince Philip, Duke of Edinburgh on the HMY Britannia in Miami for a dinner and reception during her state visit to the US. In November 1991, the Ronald Reagan Presidential Library and Museum opened, holding 50 million White House and personal papers donated by the Reagans as well as storing an accompanying museum that chronicled both of their lives. The former First Couple attended the dedication ceremony, where President Bush hailed the former First Lady for championing "the Foster Grandparents Program, heightened breast cancer awareness. She refurbished the White House with the dignity that is her legacy."

In February 1992, President Bush met with the Reagans at their Bel Air home between attending a pair of fundraisers for his re-election campaign. The Reagans attended the 1992 Republican National Convention in Houston, where the former president concluded his speech by asking Nancy, who he called "the person who has made my life's journey so meaningful, someone I have been so proud of through the years", to join him at the podium. After the election, in which Bush was defeated by Bill Clinton, the former first couple were reported to be upset over how Bush had managed his campaign.

In April 1994, the Reagans attended the funeral of Richard Nixon. In May, Reagan joined four other former First Ladies and Hillary Clinton at a gala benefit in Washington aimed at raising more than $1 million toward a new National Garden. President Reagan revealed that he had been diagnosed with Alzheimer's disease later that year, and she made herself his primary caregiver, and became actively involved with the National Alzheimer's Association and its affiliate, the Ronald and Nancy Reagan Research Institute in Chicago, Illinois. Nancy Reagan said the couple "both agreed that lending our name to the institute was the right thing to do. We’ve been public people our entire married life, you know. If we can make a difference through our involvement, then we’ve simply got to do it." Maureen Reagan would later say her stepmother had a 24-hour, daily experience with Alzheimer's: "She's the one who wakes up with it every morning and goes to sleep with it every night. You know, I think in that moment before you wake up, I think for a moment she almost forgets, and then of course (she) realizes that we are where we are."

Congressional Republicans objected to the drug policies of President Clinton, which included their desire to eliminate funding for drug courts aimed at rehabilitating first-time and nonviolent drug offenders rather than incarcerating them in prison. Reagan returned to Washington to testify before a House subcommittee in March 1995, being escorted by House Speaker Newt Gingrich. While not mentioning Clinton by name, she asserted that his administration's focus on treating hardcore drug users was only part of the solution. Democrats argued she should criticize her own party, as House Republicans wanted to cut drug education programs. Reagan said that what she most missed of her White House years was "the sense of common national purpose that so many of us felt as we tried to protect our children."

To celebrate Ronald Reagan's 85th birthday in February 1996, celebrities, politicians, and supporters held a dinner at the restaurant where he proposed to Nancy. Nancy attended the gathering after having a private dinner with her husband at their home. That year, President Clinton ran for re-election, and the Clinton campaign played a gun control commercial showing footage of the 1981 assassination attempt on President Reagan that was followed by former White House press secretary James Brady, who was wounded in the shooting, expressing his support for Clinton. Nancy wrote a letter to Clinton requesting the commercial stop being played, and the White House announced its compliance with her wishes. The Republican candidate, Bob Dole, met with the Reagans in July shortly before Nancy's 73rd birthday, his wife Elizabeth presenting Nancy with a chocolate-frosted birthday cake.

In February 1997, in a briefing timed to honor the former president's birthday, the director of the Ronald and Nancy Reagan Research Institute told New York science writers that more research was needed to deal with the increasing number of patients. Nancy Reagan delivered a videotaped message telling the group that more work laid ahead and they "must do more until we find not just the cause, but a cure." In April, Nancy Reagan joined President Bill Clinton and former Presidents Ford and Bush in signing the Summit Declaration of Commitment in advocating for participation by private citizens in solving domestic issues within the United States. Reagan went on CNN to discuss Diana, Princess of Wales in September, following the latter's death. Reagan was present for Senator Fred Thompson's address to the Reagan Library in October. In November, Reagan attended the dedication ceremony for the George H. W. Bush Presidential Library and Museum at Texas A&M University.

Reagan spoke with commissioner of public buildings at the General Services Administration Robert A. Peck about the construction of the Ronald Reagan Building and International Trade Center, favoring it as a memorial to her husband. The building finished construction in 1998, with President Clinton and Nancy Reagan in attendance to its dedication ceremony in May. She also attended the private funeral of Frank Sinatra in Los Angeles. That year, the Reagans sold the Rancho del Cielo to the Young America's Foundation, a conservative group that intended to turn the ranch into a retreat for young conservatives. Nancy released a statement: "We hope that our ranch will be a spark for many bright, young Americans in the years ahead."

In October 1999, Reagan was awarded the Distinguished Achievement Award by the Charles A. Dana Foundation. She was unable to attend the gala due to a recent fall that had fractured her rib. The five former First Ladies were asked to designate a recipient for a $100,000 foundation, and Reagan chose the Ronald Reagan Presidential Foundation for Educational Programs. In November, Reagan attended an address by Governor of Texas George W. Bush at the Reagan Library, noted as his first major speech on foreign policy. That year, Reagan sat down for an interview with Brian Lamb of C-SPAN, where she revealed the former president no longer was capable of having lucid conversations and that his friends were no longer invited to their home because he could not recognize them anymore.

Reagan christens the USS Ronald Reagan as U.S. President George W. Bush and Chairman and Chief Executive Officer of Newport News Shipbuilding William P. Frick look on, 4 March 2001

George W. Bush ran for President in 2000. In May of that year, Reagan endorsed him, crediting him with doing "a fine job of carrying on Ronnie's legacy. His agenda of tax cuts, smaller government, and a strong national defense will build pride in America just as it did when my husband was president." Reagan appeared with former presidents Ford and Bush at the 2000 Republican National Convention in Philadelphia, which featured a segment paying tribute to past Republican presidents. In an interview with Larry King, she confirmed she had spoken to Betty Ford about the condition of her husband and said she was happy she was not asked to speak again: "I did that four years ago, and I barely got through it, and I know I couldn't get through it now. So it's a good thing." Bush went on to win the election. Former President Reagan was admitted to St. John's Health Center after breaking his hip after falling in his home in January 2001. Nancy was reported to have been by his side since the accident and accompanied him to hospital, where she stayed by his beside. The couple watched the inauguration of George W. Bush before the former president was released, Nancy by his side during the ten minute ride back to their home. She arranged his home care and physical therapy scheduling. Reagan christened the USS Ronald Reagan in March with President Bush looking on. She released a statement on the death of her stepdaughter Maureen in August.

Nancy Reagan was awarded the Presidential Medal of Freedom, the nation's highest civilian honor, by President George W. Bush on July 9, 2002. President Reagan received his own Presidential Medal of Freedom in January 1993. Reagan and her husband were jointly awarded the Congressional Gold Medal on May 16, 2002, at the United States Capitol building, and were only the third president and first lady to receive it; she accepted the medal on behalf of both of them. In September, Reagan sat down for an interview with Mike Wallace where she said the worst part of her husband's Alzheimer's was that it left her "nobody to exchange memories with" and described her current days as "lonely, because really, when you come right down to it, you're in it alone. And there's nothing that anybody can do for you. So it's lonely."

In January 2003, Reagan joined four other former First Ladies for a gathering at the Hyatt Grand Champions resort in Indian Wells. The joint appearance commemorated the twentieth anniversary of the Betty Ford Center. That year, CBS intended to air The Reagans, a biographical film about the couple. Portions of its script leaked, and conservatives widely criticized it as having an unbalanced and inaccurate portrayal of the former president. Nancy Reagan responded to the film's timing by calling it "absolutely staggering" and "obviously ... very hurtful." CBS pulled the film from being broadcast. Nancy collaborated with the editor that put together Reagan: A Life in Letters, a collection of letters that her husband had written. She expressed hope that the letters would show "the charm, the humor, the intelligence" of the former president, and cited her belief that it was "important for people to get to know Ronnie, understand Ronnie, and what better way than to read the letters that he's written in his own hand." In late 2003, congressional Republicans pushed the Ronald Reagan Dime Act, a bill to honor former President Reagan by placing his profile on the dime. Nancy objected to the legislation in a statement: "While I can understand the intentions of those seeking to place my husband's face on the dime, I do not support this proposal and I am certain Ronnie would not."

Ronnie's long journey has finally taken him to a distant place where I can no longer reach him.

— Nancy Reagan (May 2004)

On February 6, 2004, her husband's 93rd birthday, Reagan was on hand for the unveiling of a new exhibit, the Air Force One Pavilion, which was intended to feature the airplane that carried her husband when he served as president. Reagan attended Vice President Dick Cheney's speech at the Reagan Library in March, where Cheney praised her as "a great first lady, and is still one of the most admired women in America."

After years of her children criticizing her and her husband for being distant, Nancy rebuilt her relationships with Patti and Michael in the early 2000s.

=== Funeral for Ronald Reagan ===
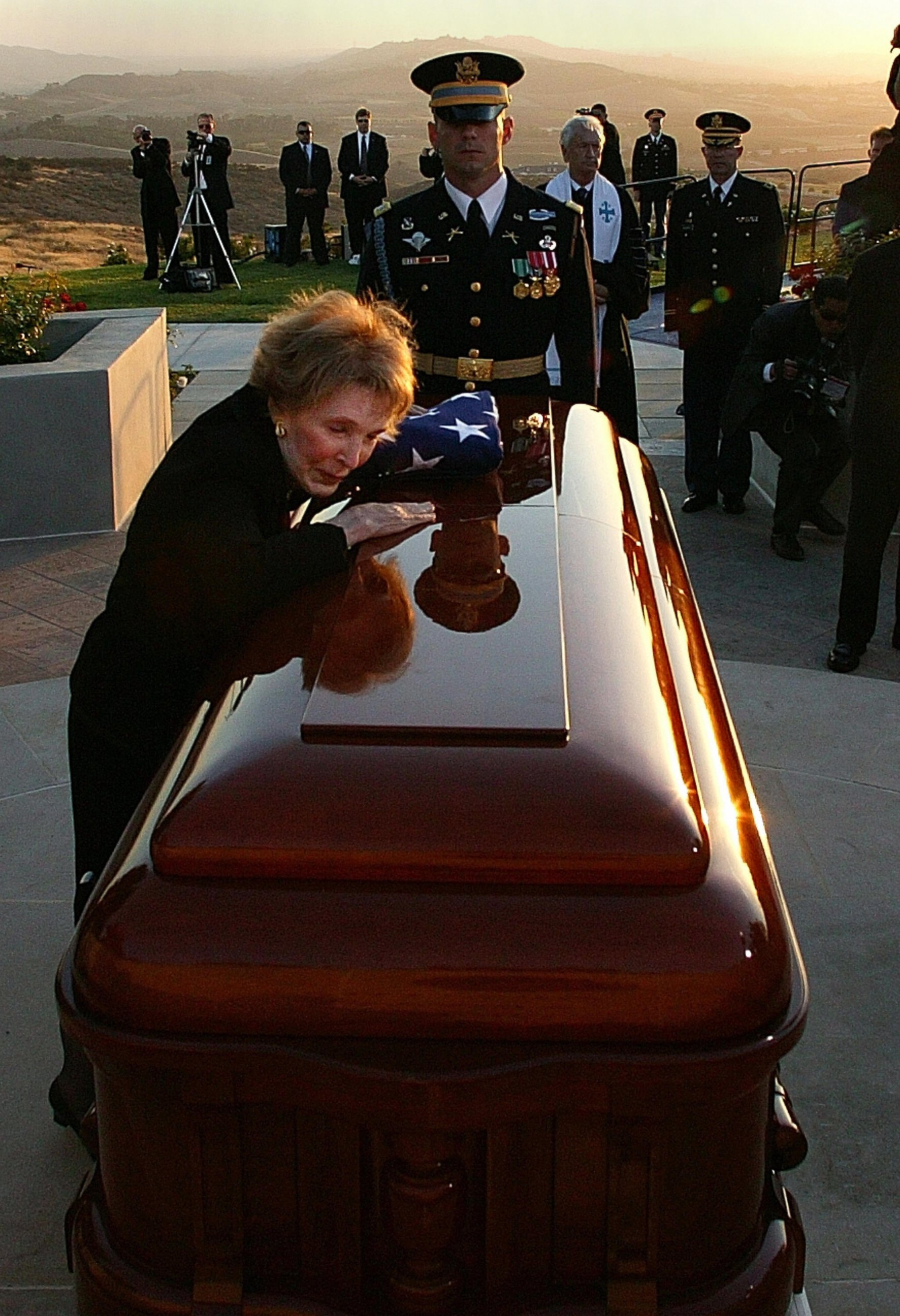
Reagan says her last goodbye to Ronald Reagan following a week-long state funeral, 2004

Ronald Reagan died in their Bel Air home on June 5, 2004. During the seven-day state funeral, Nancy, accompanied by her children and military escort, led the nation in mourning. She kept a strong composure, traveling from her home to the Reagan Library for a memorial service, then to Washington, D.C., where her husband's body lay in state for 34 hours prior to a national funeral service in the Washington National Cathedral. She returned to the library in Simi Valley for a sunset memorial service and interment, where, overcome with emotion, she lost her composure and cried in public for the first time during the week. After receiving the folded flag, she kissed the casket and mouthed "I love you" before leaving. During the week, CNN journalist Wolf Blitzer said, "She's a very, very strong woman, even though she looks frail."

She had directed the detailed planning of the funeral, which included scheduling all the major events and asking former president George H. W. Bush, as well as former British prime minister Margaret Thatcher, former Soviet Union leader Mikhail Gorbachev, and former Canadian prime minister Brian Mulroney to speak during the National Cathedral Service. She paid very close attention to the details, something she had always done in her husband's life. Betsy Bloomingdale, one of Reagan's closest friends, stated, "She looks a little frail. But she is very strong inside. She is. She has the strength. She is doing her last thing for Ronnie. And she is going to get it right." The funeral marked her first major public appearance since she delivered a speech to the 1996 Republican National Convention on her husband's behalf.

The funeral had a great impact on her public image. Following substantial criticism during her tenure as first lady, she was seen somewhat as a national heroine, praised by many for supporting and caring for her husband while he suffered from Alzheimer's disease. U.S. News & World Report opined, "after a decade in the shadows, a different, softer Nancy Reagan emerged."

=== Widowhood ===
Following her husband's death, Reagan remained active in politics, particularly relating to stem cell research. Beginning in 2004, she favored what many consider to be the Democratic Party's position, and urged President George W. Bush to support federally funded embryonic stem cell research, in the hope that this science could lead to a cure for Alzheimer's disease. Although she failed to change the president's position, she did support his campaign for a second term. It became a yearly tradition for her to visit her husband's grave at the Reagan Library on the anniversary of his death.

In July 2004, Reagan made an appearance on the USS Ronald Reagan and met with Deputy Defense Secretary Paul Wolfowitz. She toured the Ronald Reagan Room on the carrier, which featured memorabilia from her husband's life.

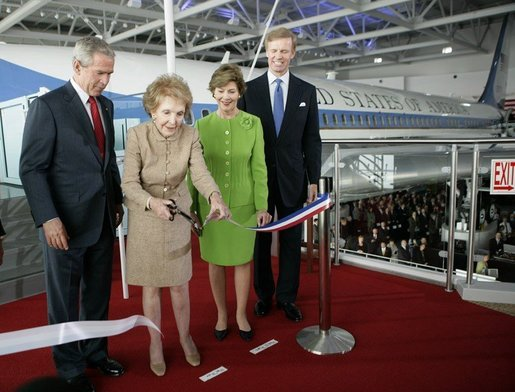
Reagan dedicates the Air Force One Pavilion at the Reagan Library as President Bush and his wife Laura look on, October 2005

In April 2005, after the death of Pope John Paul II, Reagan spoke over the phone with Wolf Blitzer on her and her husband's relationship with him. In May, Reagan was honored at a gala dinner at the Ronald Reagan Building in Washington, D.C., where guests included Dick Cheney, Harry Reid, and Condoleezza Rice. The following month, Reagan slipped and fell in her hotel room during a private vacation to Britain. She was released from the hospital, and her aide Cathy Busch confirmed she would "be following her doctor’s advice to limit her activities over the next two weeks until the pain subsides and full mobility returns". In October, Reagan attended the opening ceremony for the Air Force One Pavilion at the Reagan Library with President Bush, where the former said that he and his wife were "great fans of Nancy Reagan. We admire her strength, we admire the love she has for her husband, and we're grateful for your friendship."

In 2007, she attended the national funeral service for Gerald Ford in the Washington National Cathedral. That year saw the publication of The Reagan Diaries, a series of diary entries by the former president edited by the historian Douglas Brinkley. Nancy Reagan authorized their release. In an interview with Larry King, Reagan said the diary contained information about her husband that people did not know and that they were historically significant. Reagan hosted two 2008 Republican presidential debates at the Reagan Presidential Library, the first in May 2007 and the second in January 2008. On March 25, she formally endorsed Senator John McCain, then the presumptive Republican party nominee for president, but McCain would go on to lose the election to Barack Obama.

Reagan attended the funeral of Lady Bird Johnson in Austin, Texas, on July 14, 2007, and three days later accepted the highest Polish distinction, the Order of the White Eagle, on behalf of Ronald Reagan at the Reagan Library. The Reagan Library opened the temporary exhibit "Nancy Reagan: A First Lady's Style", which displayed over eighty designer dresses belonging to her.

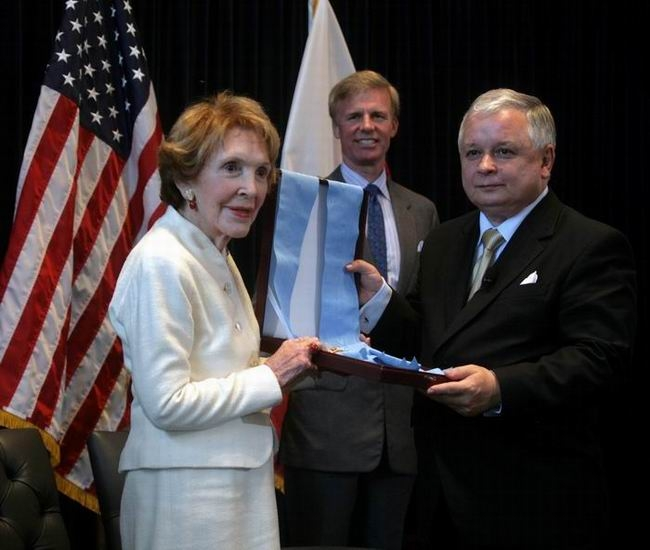
Reagan accepts the Order of the White Eagle from Polish President Lech Kaczyński on behalf of Ronald Reagan, July 15, 2007

Reagan's health and well-being became a prominent concern in 2008. In February, she suffered a fall at her Bel Air home and was taken to Saint John's Health Center in Santa Monica, California. Doctors reported that she did not break her hip as feared, and she was released from the hospital two days later. News commentators noted that Reagan's step had slowed significantly, as the following month she walked in very slow strides with John McCain.

In October 2008, Reagan was admitted to Ronald Reagan UCLA Medical Center after falling at home. Doctors determined that the 87-year-old had fractured her pelvis and sacrum, and could recuperate at home with a regimen of physical therapy. As a result of her mishap, medical articles were published containing information on how to prevent falls. In January 2009, Reagan was said to be "improving every day and starting to get out more and more".

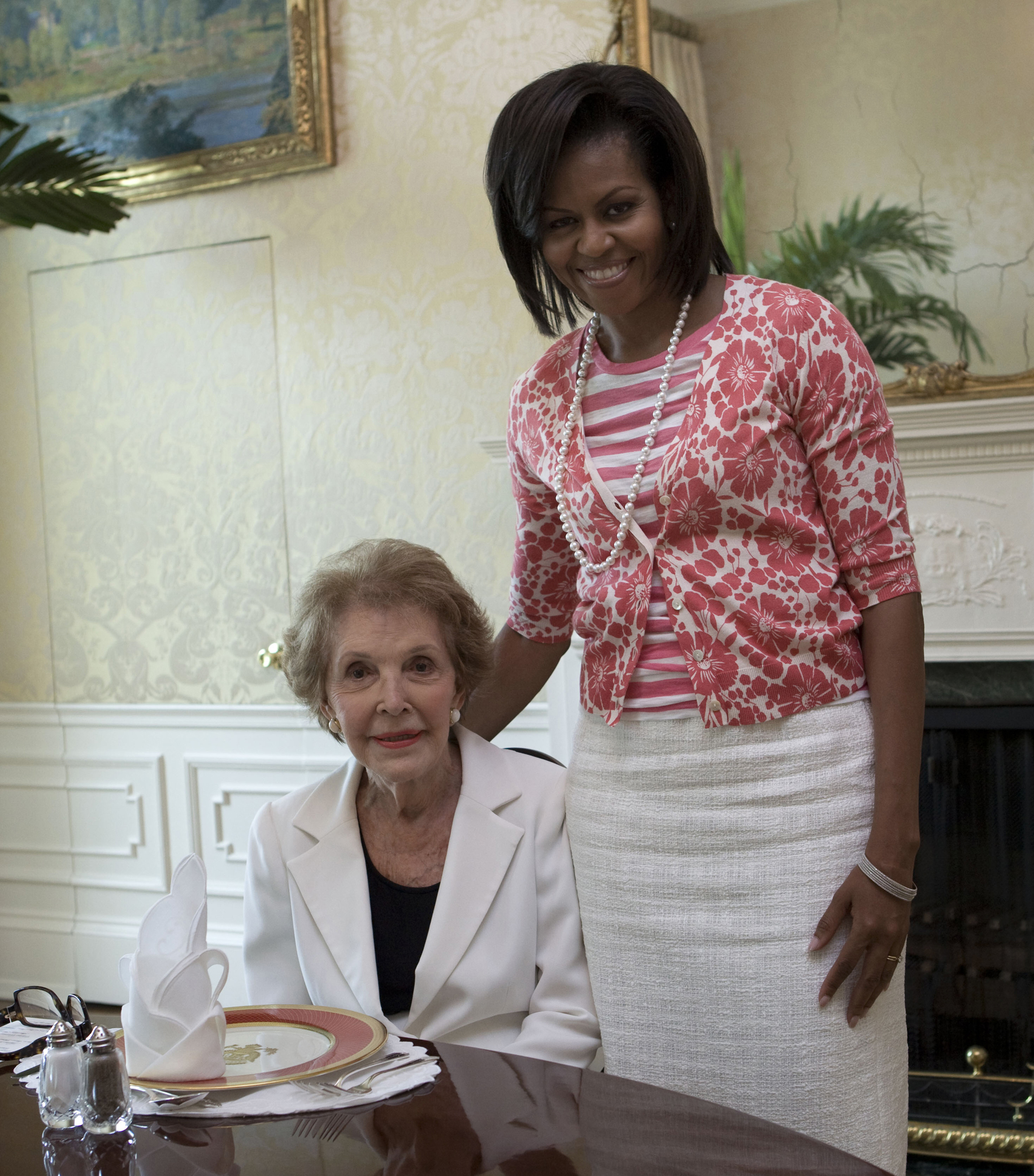
Reagan with First Lady Michelle Obama at a White House luncheon, June 3, 2009

In March 2009, she praised President Barack Obama for reversing the ban on federally funded embryonic stem cell research. She traveled to Washington, D.C., in June 2009 to unveil a statue of her late husband in the Capitol rotunda. She was also on hand as President Obama signed the Ronald Reagan Centennial Commission Act, and lunched privately with Michelle Obama. Reagan revealed in an interview with Vanity Fair that Michelle Obama had telephoned her for advice on living and entertaining in the White House. Following the death of Senator Ted Kennedy in August 2009, she said she was "terribly saddened ... Given our political differences, people are sometimes surprised how close Ronnie and I have been to the Kennedy family ... I will miss him." In May 2010, Reagan sat in the front row while Laura Bush read excerpts from her memoir Spoken from the Heart and shared anecdotes during the Perspectives in Leadership series at the Reagan Library. Bush compared herself to Reagan: "She loves her husband, and I love mine. Both of us loved the man we lived with there, in the White House." She attended the funeral of Betty Ford in Rancho Mirage, California, on July 12, 2011.

Reagan hosted a 2012 Republican presidential debate at the Reagan Presidential Library on September 7, 2011. She suffered a fall in March 2012. Two months later, she endured several broken ribs, which prevented her from attending a speech given by Paul Ryan in the Reagan Presidential Library in May 2012. She endorsed Republican presidential candidate Mitt Romney on May 31, 2012, explaining that her husband would have liked Romney's business background and what she called "strong principles". Following the death of former British Prime Minister Margaret Thatcher in April 2013, she stated, "The world has lost a true champion of freedom and democracy ... Ronnie and I knew her as a dear and trusted friend, and I will miss her."

In August 2015, Reagan invited the 2016 Republican presidential candidates to the Reagan Library for a debate moderated by CNN.

== Death and funeral ==
On March 6, 2016, Nancy Reagan died of congestive heart failure at her home in Los Angeles at the age of 94. On March 7, President Barack Obama issued a presidential proclamation ordering the US flag to be flown at half-staff until sunset on the day of Reagan's interment.

External videos
- Nancy Reagan funeral service, March 11, 2016, C-SPAN

Her funeral was held on March 11 at the Ronald Reagan Presidential Library in Simi Valley, California. Representatives from ten first families attended, including former president George W. Bush, then-first lady Michelle Obama, former first ladies Laura Bush and Rosalynn Carter, and then-2016 presidential candidate former U.S. secretary of state Hillary Clinton, herself a former first lady. Presidential children Steven Ford, Tricia Nixon Cox, Luci Baines Johnson, and Caroline Kennedy were also in attendance, as was presidential grandchild Anne Eisenhower Flottl.

Other attendees included California governor Jerry Brown, former governors Arnold Schwarzenegger and Pete Wilson, former House speakers Nancy Pelosi and Newt Gingrich, and former members of the Reagan administration, including George P. Shultz and Edwin Meese. There were also many attendees from the Hollywood entertainment industry, including Mr. T, Maria Shriver (Schwarzenegger's then-wife), Wayne Newton, Johnny Mathis, Anjelica Huston, John Stamos, Tom Selleck, Bo Derek, and Melissa Rivers. In all there were some 1,000 guests.

Eulogies were given by former prime minister of Canada Brian Mulroney, former secretary of state James Baker, Diane Sawyer, Tom Brokaw, and Reagan's children Patti Davis and Ron Reagan. After the funeral, Reagan was interred next to her husband.

== Legacy ==
=== Public image ===
Nancy presented herself as a traditional housewife, providing an alternative to the more active role for women advocated by the feminist movement. Her opponents believed her to be materialistic. Individuals around Nancy, such as writers Lou Cannon and Bill Libby, contested the uptight image that the public had of her and said that in private she was deeply caring.

Throughout her husband's political career, Nancy was protective of Ronald and stayed involved to keep him from overworking himself. Her involvement was controversial, with some describing it as bringing stability and others seeing it as manipulative. Nancy's approval became a test for people around Ronald, and she told him when she felt someone should not be trusted.

Nancy did not get along well with the media, and she was affronted by what she considered slander against her family. She was ridiculed for "the gaze", where she sat perfectly still and stared admiringly at her husband while he spoke in public.

Nancy's fashion sense became a major part of her image.

=== Historical assessments ===
Since 1982, Siena College Research Institute has conducted occasional surveys asking historians to assess American first ladies according to a cumulative score on the independent criteria of their background, value to the country, intelligence, courage, accomplishments, integrity, leadership, being their own women, public image, and value to the president. In terms of cumulative assessment Reagan has been ranked:

- 39th-best of 42 in 1982
- 36th-best of 37 in 1993
- 28th-best of 38 in 2003
- 15th-best of 38 in 2008
- 15th-best of 39 in 2014
- 15th-best of 40 in 2020

In the 1993 Sienna Research Institute survey, the first conducted after Reagan left the White House, Reagan was assessed very poorly by historians, ranking the second-worst, with only Mary Todd Lincoln being given a worse assessment. Reagan was ranked the lowest in half of the criteria (background, value to the country, intelligence, courage, and integrity). Regard for Reagan improved in the following three iterations of the survey. In the three most recent iterations of the survey (conducted in 2008, 2014, and 2020), Reagan has been ranked as the 15th-best First Lady. In the 2008 Siena Research Institute survey, Reagan was ranked the 4th-highest in value to the president, but was ranked the lowest in integrity. In the 2003 survey, Reagan ranked the 5th-highest in value to the president. In the 2014 survey, Reagan and her husband were ranked the 16th-highest out of 39 first couples in terms of being a "power couple". In the 2014 survey, historians ranked Reagan among 20th and 21st century American first ladies as being the 5th greatest in terms of being a "political asset" and 5th greatest in terms of being a strong public communicator.

Reagan and her husband have each posthumously experienced continued criticism for having, during their time in the White House, spent years publicly ignoring the HIV/AIDS epidemic, which began during her husband's presidency. The epidemic had initially predominantly impacted the male homosexual community. Reagan's great extended public silence on this matter has been contrasted with her coinciding vocalness against drug use. Reagan's extended failure to give significant public acknowledgement of this epidemic has been seen as one of the greatest detractions in her retrospective public regard. However, there has been reporting to suggest that, privately, Reagan did unsuccessfully urge her husband's administration to address the epidemic.

=== Awards and honors ===
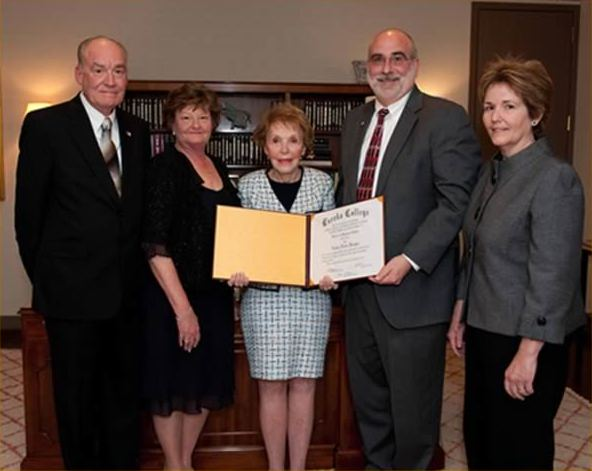
Reagan receiving an honorary degree from Eureka College, 2009

As noted earlier, Nancy Reagan was awarded the Presidential Medal of Freedom in 2002 and the Congressional Gold Medal, in the same year. In 1989, she received the Council of Fashion Designers of America's lifetime achievement award.

As First Lady, Nancy Reagan received an Honorary Doctorate of Laws degree from Pepperdine University in 1983. Later, she received an Honorary Doctor of Humane Letters degree from Eureka College in Illinois, her husband's alma mater, in 2009.

== Filmography ==
- The Crippler (1940) (short)
- Portrait of Jennie (1948)
- The Doctor and the Girl (1949)
- East Side, West Side (1949)
- Shadow on the Wall (1950)
- The Next Voice You Hear... (1950)
- Night into Morning (1951)
- It's a Big Country (1951)
- Talk About a Stranger (1952)
- Shadow in the Sky (1952)
- Donovan's Brain (1953)
- The Dark Wave (1956) (short)
- Hellcats of the Navy (1957)
- Crash Landing (1958)

As Nancy Davis, she also made a number of television appearances from 1953 to 1962, as a guest star in dramatic shows or installments of anthology series. These included Ford Television Theatre (her first appearance with Ronald Reagan came during a 1953 episode titled "First Born"), Schlitz Playhouse of Stars, Dick Powell's Zane Grey Theatre (appearing with Ronald Reagan in the 1961 episode "The Long Shadow"), Wagon Train, The Tall Man, and General Electric Theater (hosted by Ronald Reagan).

== Bibliography ==
- Benze, James G. Jr. (1996). "Nancy Reagan". In Gould, Lewis L. (ed.). American First Ladies: Their Lives and Their Legacy. Garland Publishing. pp. 583–607. ISBN 978-0-8153-1479-0.
- Boller, Paul F. Jr. (1988). Presidential Wives. Oxford University Press. ISBN 978-0-19-503763-0.
- Brands, H. W. (2015). Reagan: The Life. Anchor Books. ISBN 978-0-385-53639-4.
- Caroli, Betty Boyd (2010). First Ladies: From Martha Washington to Michelle Obama. Oxford University Press. ISBN 978-0-19-539285-2.
- Hendricks, Nancy (2015). America's First Ladies: A Historical Encyclopedia and Primary Document Collection of the Remarkable Women of the White House. Bloomsbury Publishing. ISBN 978-1-61069-883-2.
- Roberts, Jason (2016). "Nancy Reagan". In Sibley, Katherine A. S. (ed.). A Companion to First Ladies. John Wiley & Sons. pp. 585–603. ISBN 978-1-118-73218-2.
- Schneider, Dorothy; Schneider, Carl J. (2010). First Ladies: A Biographical Dictionary (3rd ed.). Facts on File. ISBN 978-1-4381-0815-5.

Honorary titles
Preceded by Bernice Brown	First Lady of California; 1967–1975	Succeeded by Gloria Deukmejian
Preceded by Rosalynn Carter	First Lady of the United States; 1981–1989	Succeeded by Barbara Bush
