= Aaron Shikler =

American painter (1922–2015)

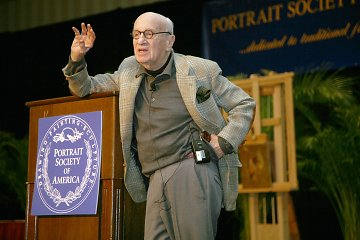
- Aaron Shikler at The Art of the Portrait Conference, 10th Anniversary Celebration
- Born: March 18, 1922; Brooklyn, New York City
- Died: November 12, 2015 (aged 93); Manhattan, New York City
- Education: The High School of Music & Art; Temple University's Tyler School of Art; Hans Hofmann
- Known for: Portrait Painting
- Notable work: The John F. Kennedy Official Portrait
- Spouse: Barbara Shikler

White House Curator William G. Allman discusses the inspiration behind Shikler's 1970 portrait of John F. Kennedy

Aaron Abraham Shikler (March 18, 1922 – November 12, 2015) was an American artist noted for portraits of American statesmen, such as the official portrait of John F. Kennedy, and celebrities such as Jane Engelhard and Sister Parish.

== Early life ==
Shikler was born in Brooklyn, New York on March 18, 1922. His parents were Eastern European Jewish immigrants who came to the United States before World War I. After graduating from The High School of Music & Art in 1940, Shikler studied at the Tyler School of Art in Philadelphia, and at the Hans Hofmann School in New York. Drafted in 1943, he served in the U.S. Army Air Corps during World War II as a cartographer in Europe. He married Barbara Lurie, whom he met at Tyler, and had two children with her. Barbara was diagnosed with lung cancer and died in 1998.

== Work ==
Jacqueline Kennedy personally selected Shikler in 1970 to provide the posthumous character study of John F. Kennedy, Oil Portrait of John F. Kennedy, which serves as Kennedy's official White House portrait. He also painted the official White House portraits of First Ladies Jacqueline Kennedy and Nancy Reagan, as well as portraits of the Kennedy children and is represented in numerous public collections such as The Brooklyn Museum of Art, The Metropolitan Museum of Art, the Hirshhorn Museum and Sculpture Garden, the New Britain Museum of American Art, and the National Academy of Design.

Shikler painted the official White House portraits of Nancy and Ronald Reagan in 1989. His portrait of Ronald Reagan was subsequently rejected as being an insufficient likeness and put into storage in 1991. A second portrait, painted by Everett Raymond Kinstler in 1991, was deemed more successful and presently hangs in the White House. Shikler's portrait of Nancy Reagan depicted her in a red dress and is presently part of the White House collection.

== Awards and honors ==
Shikler was elected a centennial fellow of Temple University in 1985, an academician of the National Academy of Design in 1965 and an associate of the National Academy of Design in 1962. Shikler received the Louis Comfort Tiffany Award in 1957 and the Thomas B. Clarke Prize in 1958, 1960, and 1961. In 1976, he received the State Department Traveling Grant, a Certificate of Honor at the Tyler School of Art and the Benjamin Altman Prize from the National Academy of Design.

== Personal life and death ==
Shikler continued to paint in his 3,500-square-foot (330 m^{2}) apartment at 44 West 77th Street, where he completed many of his portraits. He died of kidney failure on November 12, 2015.

== Gallery ==
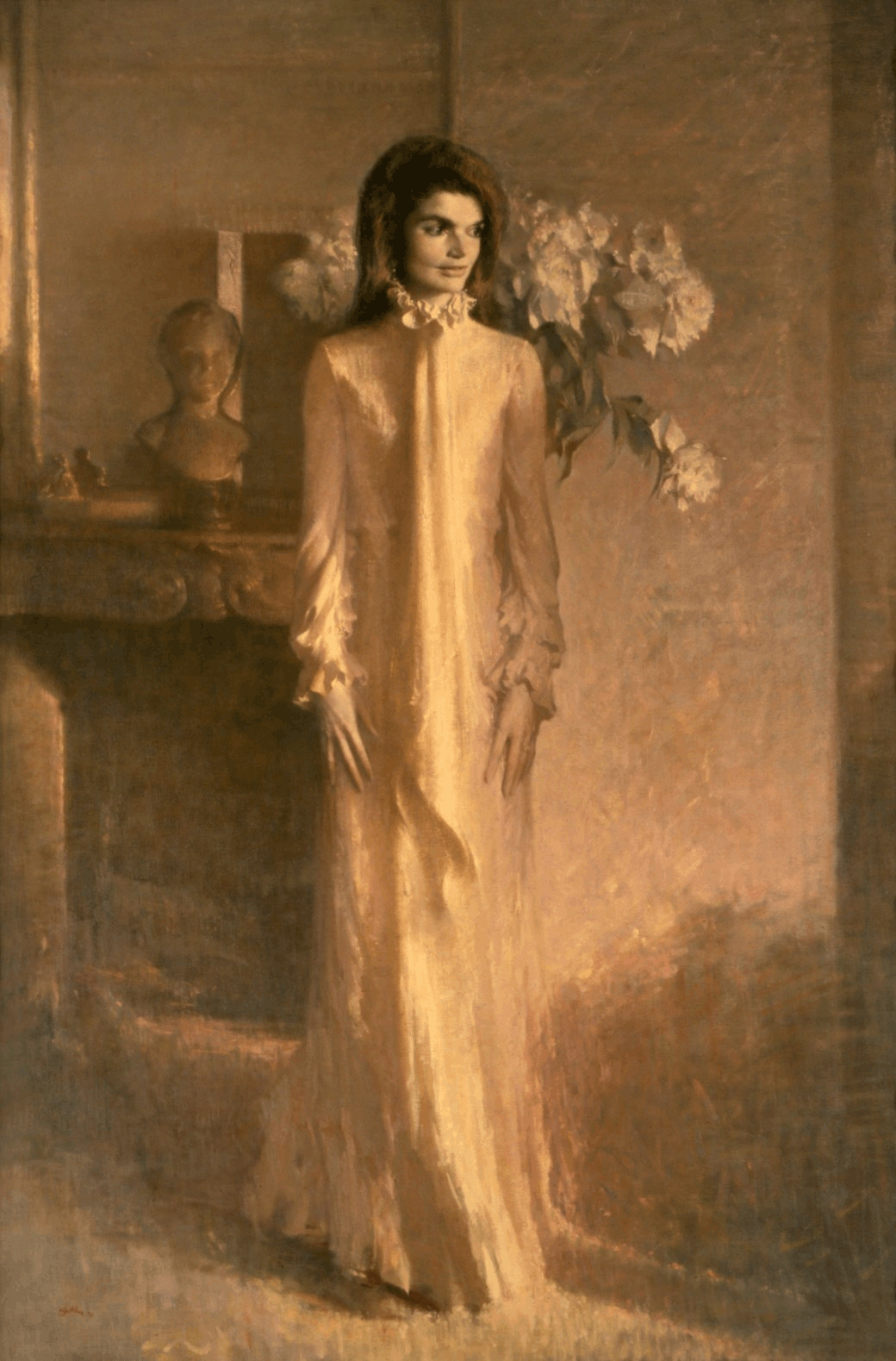
Jackie Kennedy's official White House portrait by Shikler hangs in the Vermeil Room.

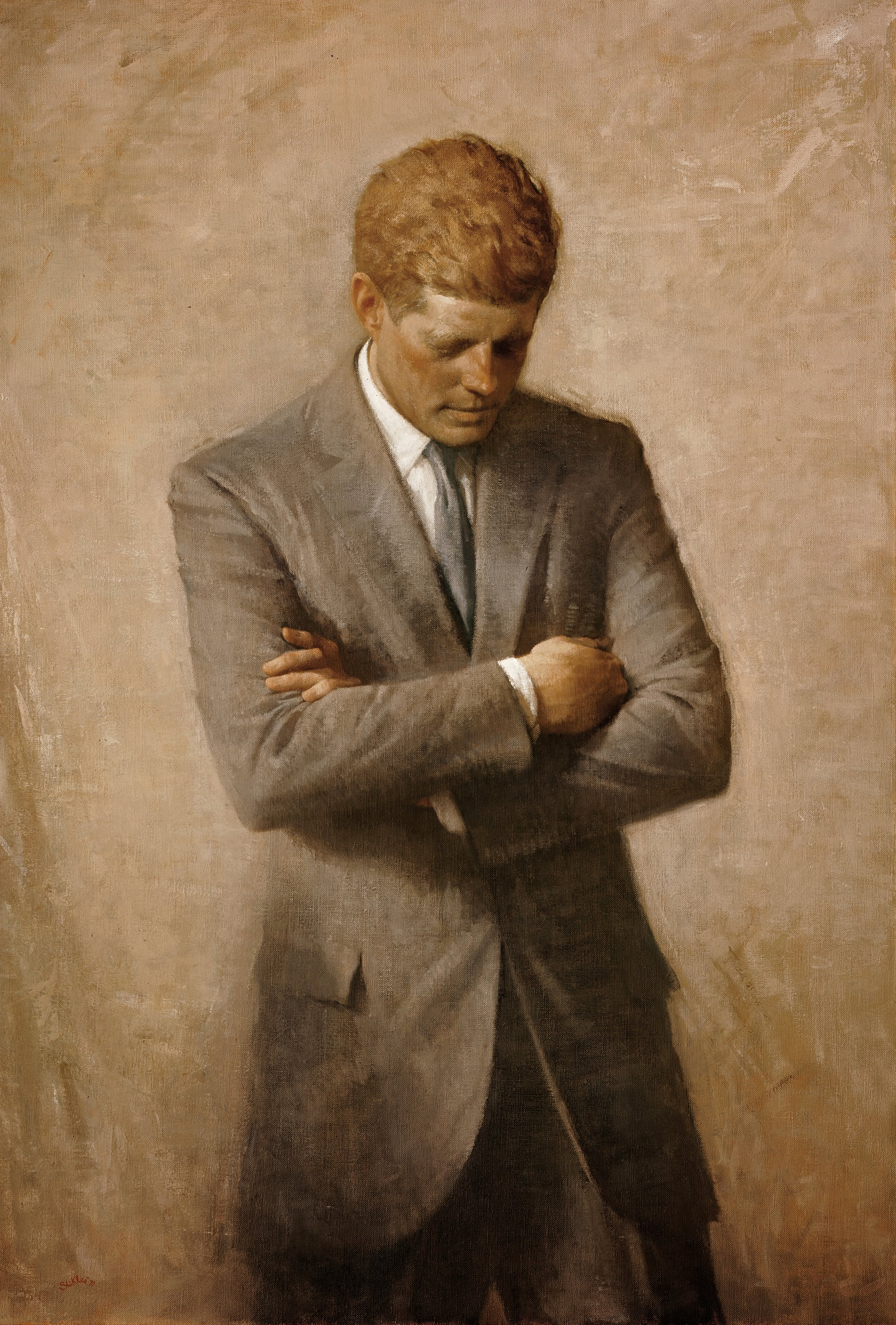
Official Presidential portrait of John F. Kennedy painted by Shikler.

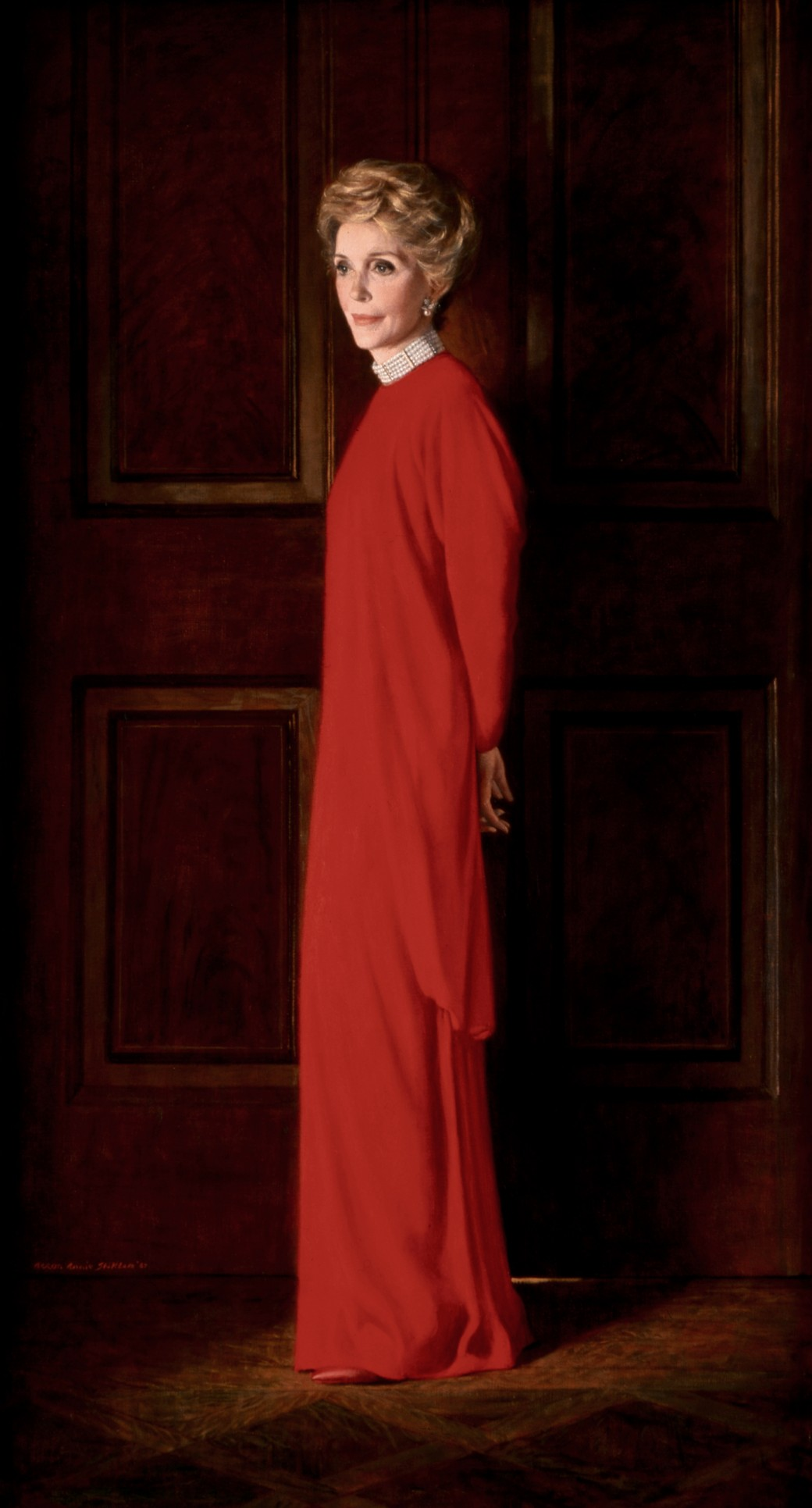
Nancy Reagan's official White House portrait by Shikler hangs in the Vermeil Room.

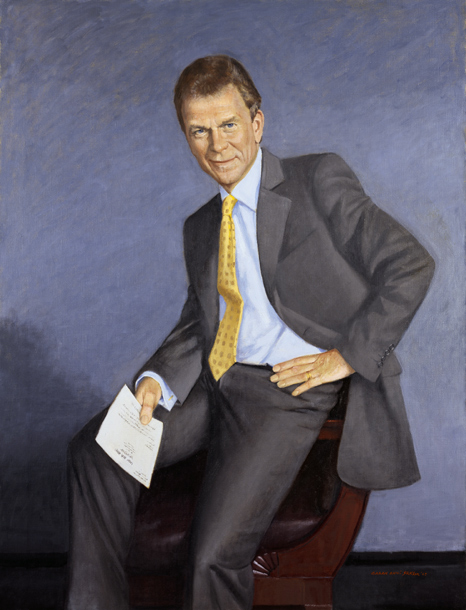
Official Senate portrait of Tom Daschle

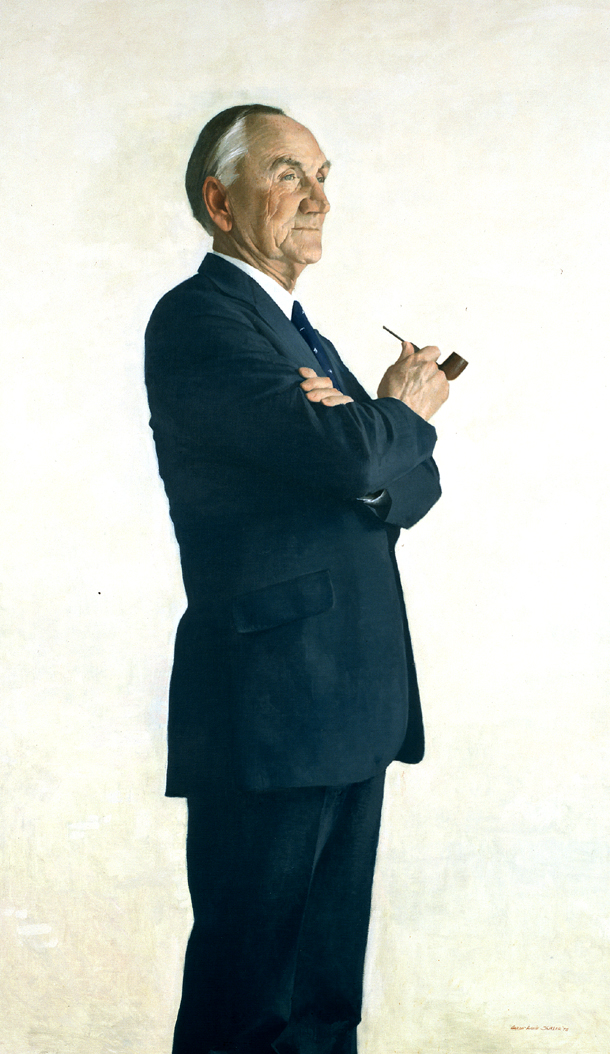
Portrait of Montana Senator Mike Mansfield

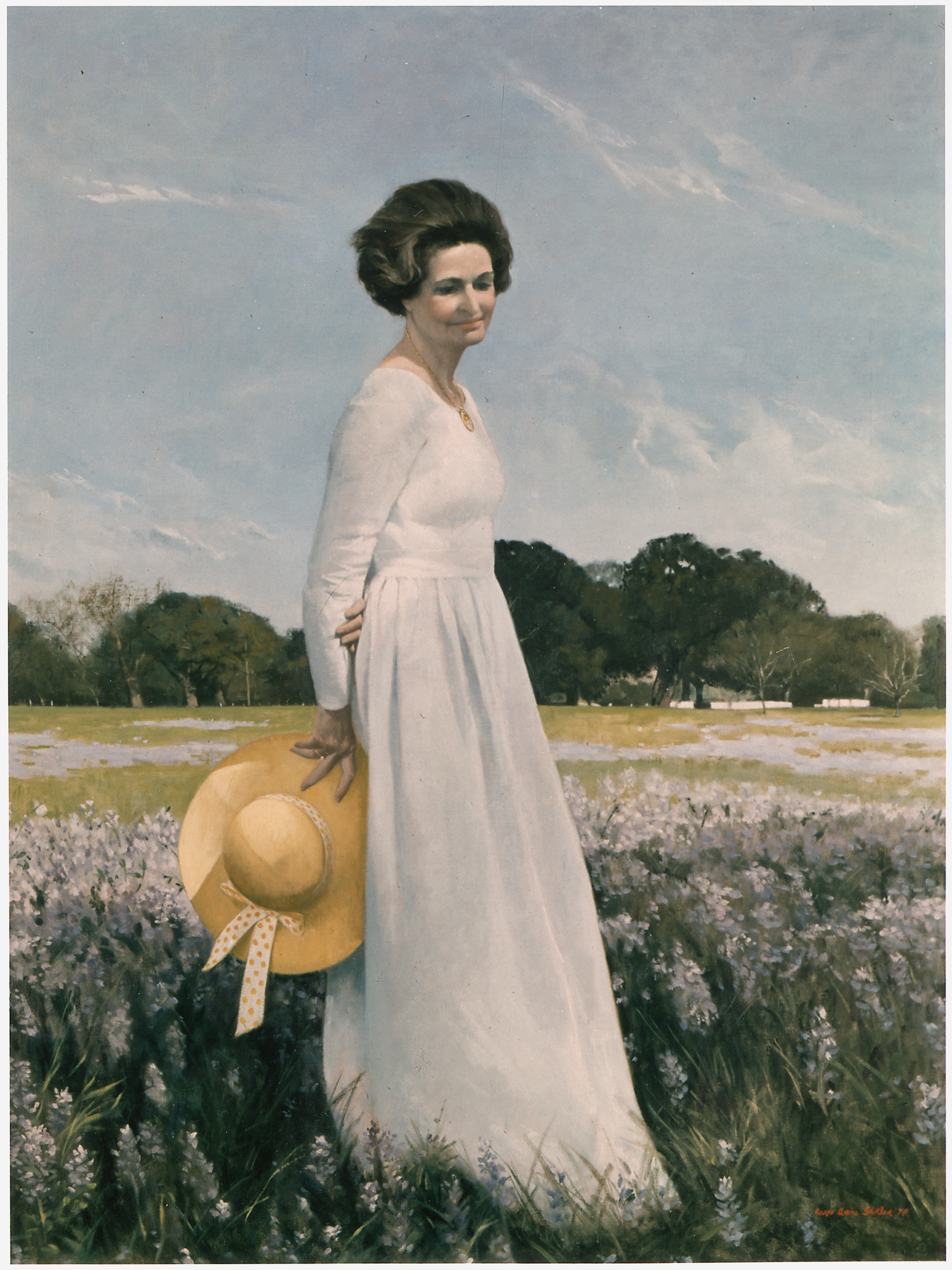
Lady Bird Johnson
