= Office of Fine Arts =

U.S. State Department division

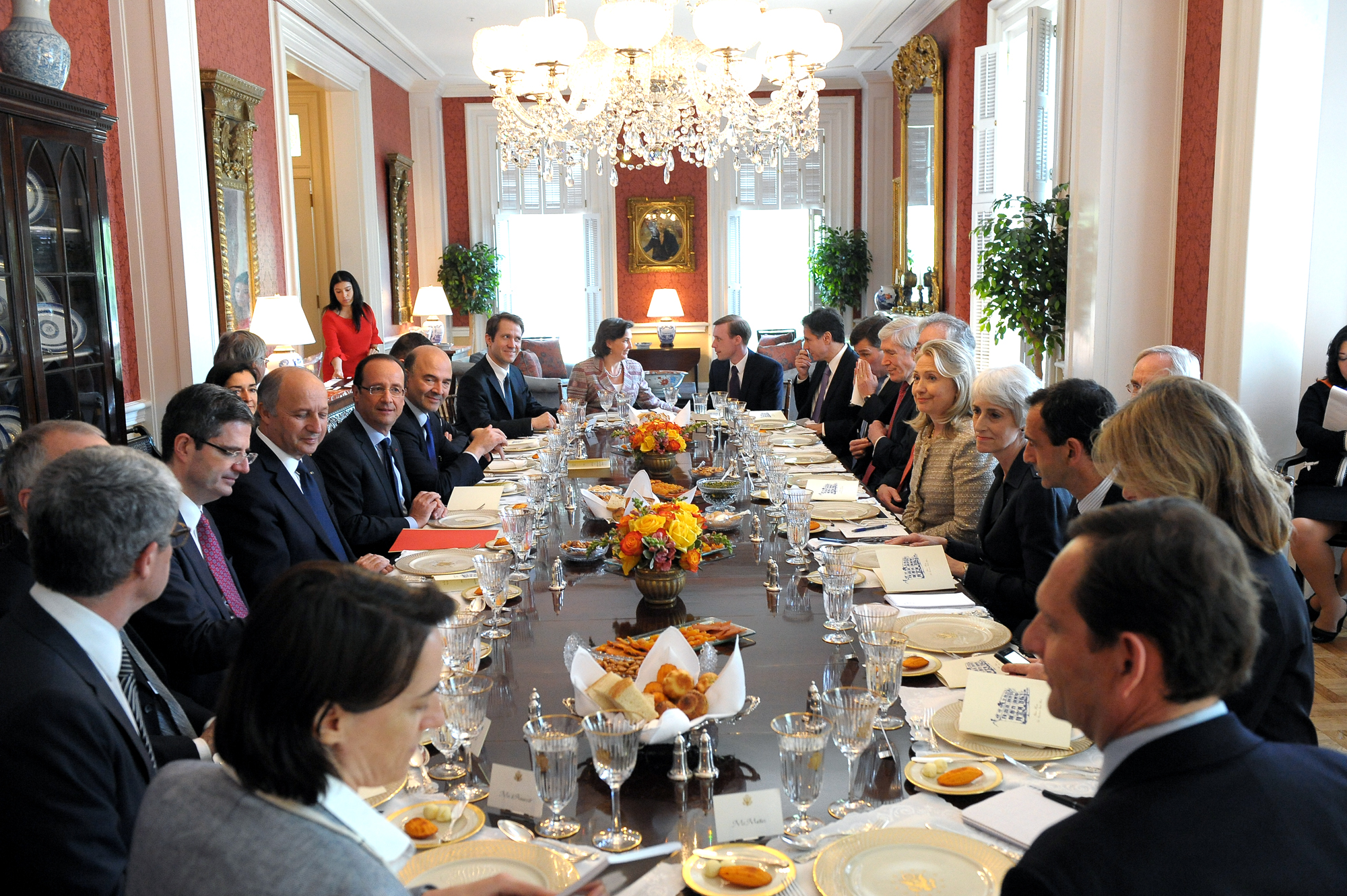
- Secretary Clinton hosts a working lunch for French President Hollande in the Treaty Room at Blair House.

Office overview
- Formed: January 1961; 65 years ago
- Headquarters: 2201 C Street NW; M/FA Room 8213; Washington, D.C. 20520; 38.8944°N 77.0484°W
- Motto: To employ the fine arts in support of the diplomatic arts
- Office executive: Director of the Diplomatic Reception Rooms
- Parent department: Under Secretary for Management
- Parent agency: U.S. State Department
- Child Office: Office of the Curator
- Website: www.diplomaticrooms.state.gov
- Agency ID: (M/FA)

The Office of Fine Arts (M/FA) is a division of the U.S. Department of State reporting to the Under Secretary of State for Management. The mission of the office is to administer appropriate settings for dialogue between U.S. officials and their international guests, to illustrate the continuity of American diplomacy through relevant objects, and to celebrate American cultural heritage through the acquisition, preservation and display of works of art with people around the world.

The office operates the Diplomatic Reception Rooms, a museum institution, in the Department of State's headquarters, the Harry S Truman Building, as well as the collections at the president's guest house, Blair House, covering two of the agency's nine heritage asset collections. The office also is tasked with decorating the offices of the Secretary of State and other senior leadership. In fulfilling these duties, the office has been assisted by the Fine Arts Committee and outside charitable organizations, including the Fund for the Endowment of the Diplomatic Reception Rooms and the Blair House Foundation.

== History ==
The work of the office began in 1961, being first tasked with the Americana Project: to remodel and redecorate the 42 Diplomatic Reception Rooms. The Americana Project was headed by the former Assistant Chief of Protocol, Clement Conger, under Secretary of State Christian Herter during the Kennedy administration. Conger had years earlier recommended space for official government entertainment be made in the expansion to the DOS headquarters and Congress had approved this. However, Congress did not appropriate funds for furnishings and interior decoration. Since it began, the office's only use of tax money has been for the salaries and expenses of a small staff.

== Diplomatic Reception Rooms ==
I use [the Diplomatic Reception Rooms] constantly with visitors, to sort of do that transformation of a couple of hundred years and take them back to our founding documents because only by talking about these men and talking about what they did, in the surroundings that would be familiar to them, can I show [visitors] how we became what we became.

— General Colin Powell, 65th Secretary of State

The Diplomatic Reception Rooms, a museum institution, is used by the President, Vice President, and Secretary of State to officially entertain heads of state, heads of government, foreign ministers, as well as other distinguished foreign and American guests. Here, the Office of Fine Arts maintains a museum collection estimated to be worth $125 million. Objects in the collection reflect American art and architecture from the time of the nation's founding and its formative years, 1750–1825, spanning the Colonial, Revolutionary, Confederation, Federalist, Jeffersonian, and Good Feelings eras. Approximately 100,000 visitors tour the rooms each year, with public tours being held three times a day. All of the items in the collection have been acquired through donations from private citizens, foundations, and corporations.

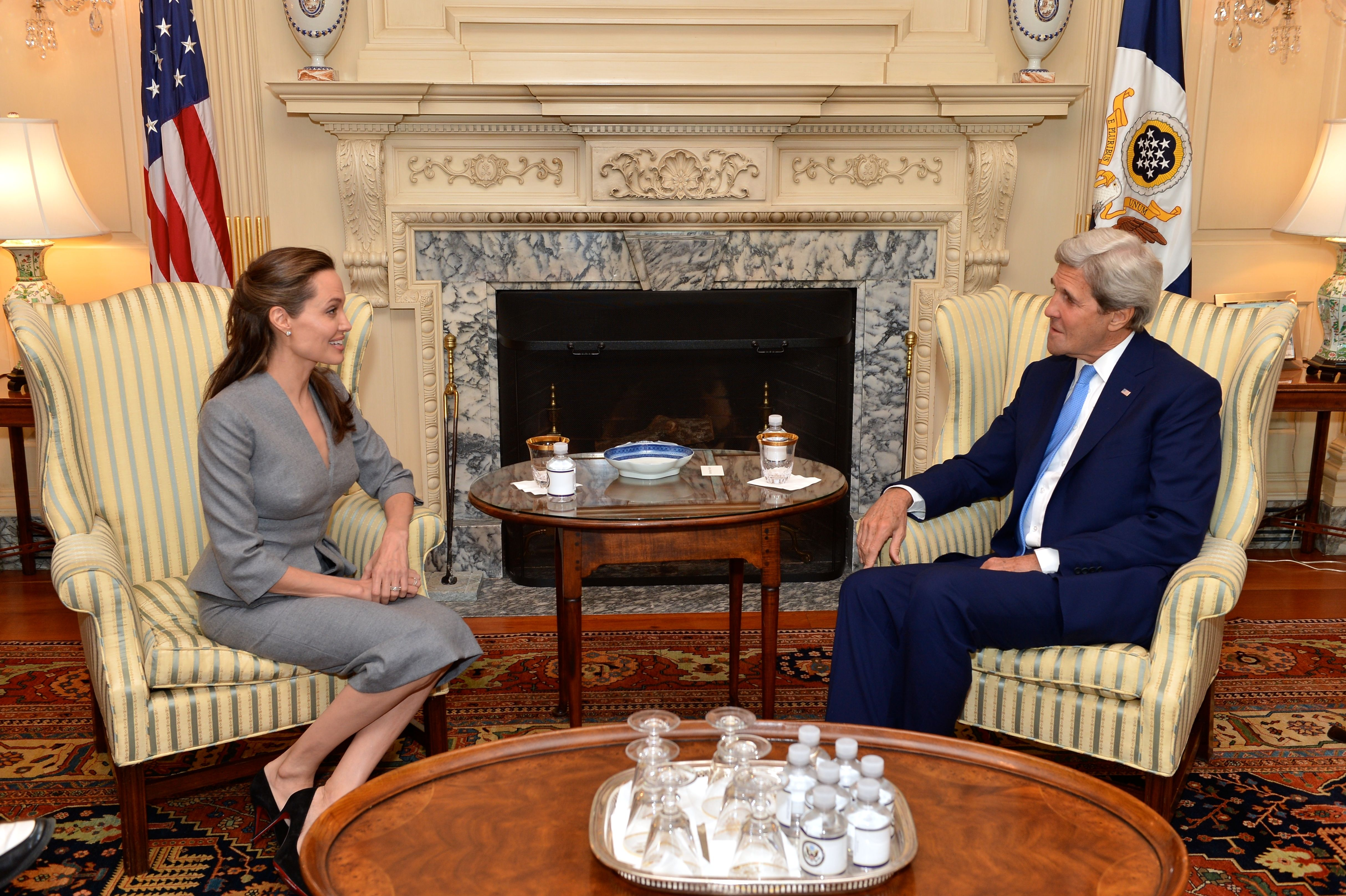
Angelina Jolie and Secretary Kerry in the Office of the Secretary of State.

Office of Fine Arts staff take care to curate the rooms with items that are evocative of the values held by the emerging American nation as diplomats and American leadership use the rooms to convey the nation's continued dedication to those values. Additionally the environment may positively inspire civil service and foreign service staff as Secretary Shultz put forward: "And [US Government staff] feel now 'I'm here as part of the history of what's going on and maybe if we do things right they'll hang our picture up here someday and 200 years from now somebody will point to it."

== Blair House ==
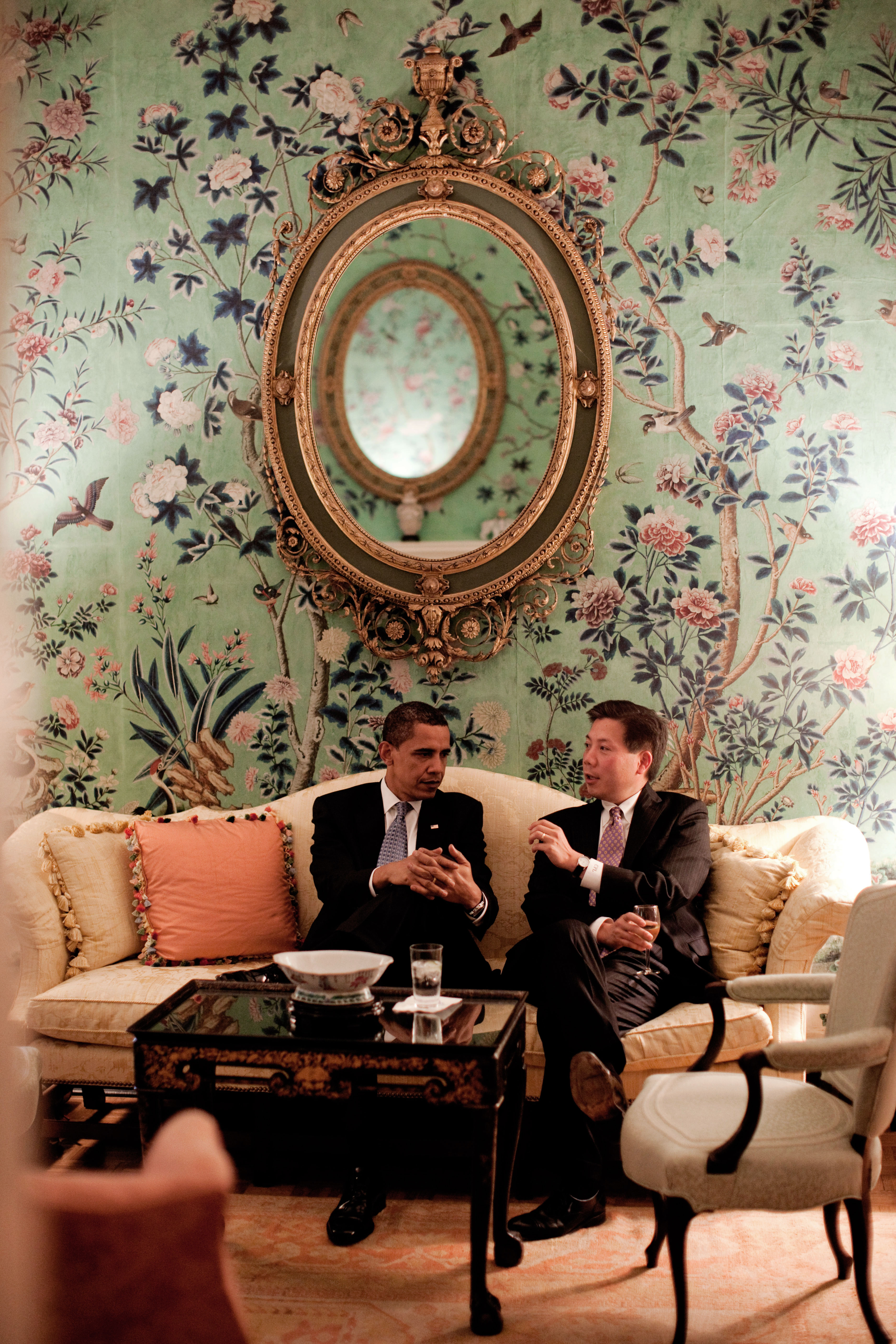
President Obama and Labor Secretary Lu in the Dillon Room, Blair House, 2009.

The President's Guest House, commonly known as Blair House, is a complex of four formerly separate buildings: Blair House, Lee House, Peter Parker House, and 704 Jackson Place. It is composed of 115 rooms and 30 bathrooms. The President's Guest House is primarily used to host visiting dignitaries and other guests of the president and has been called "the world's most exclusive hotel". It is larger than the White House and closed to the public. The Buildings are owned by the General Services Administration and are managed by the Chief of Protocol of the United States in cooperation with the Diplomatic Security Service, the Bureau of Administration and the Office of Fine Arts.

The financing of the preservation of historic furnishings and art found in the Guest House is supported by an outside 501(c)(3) organization, the Blair House Restoration Fund.

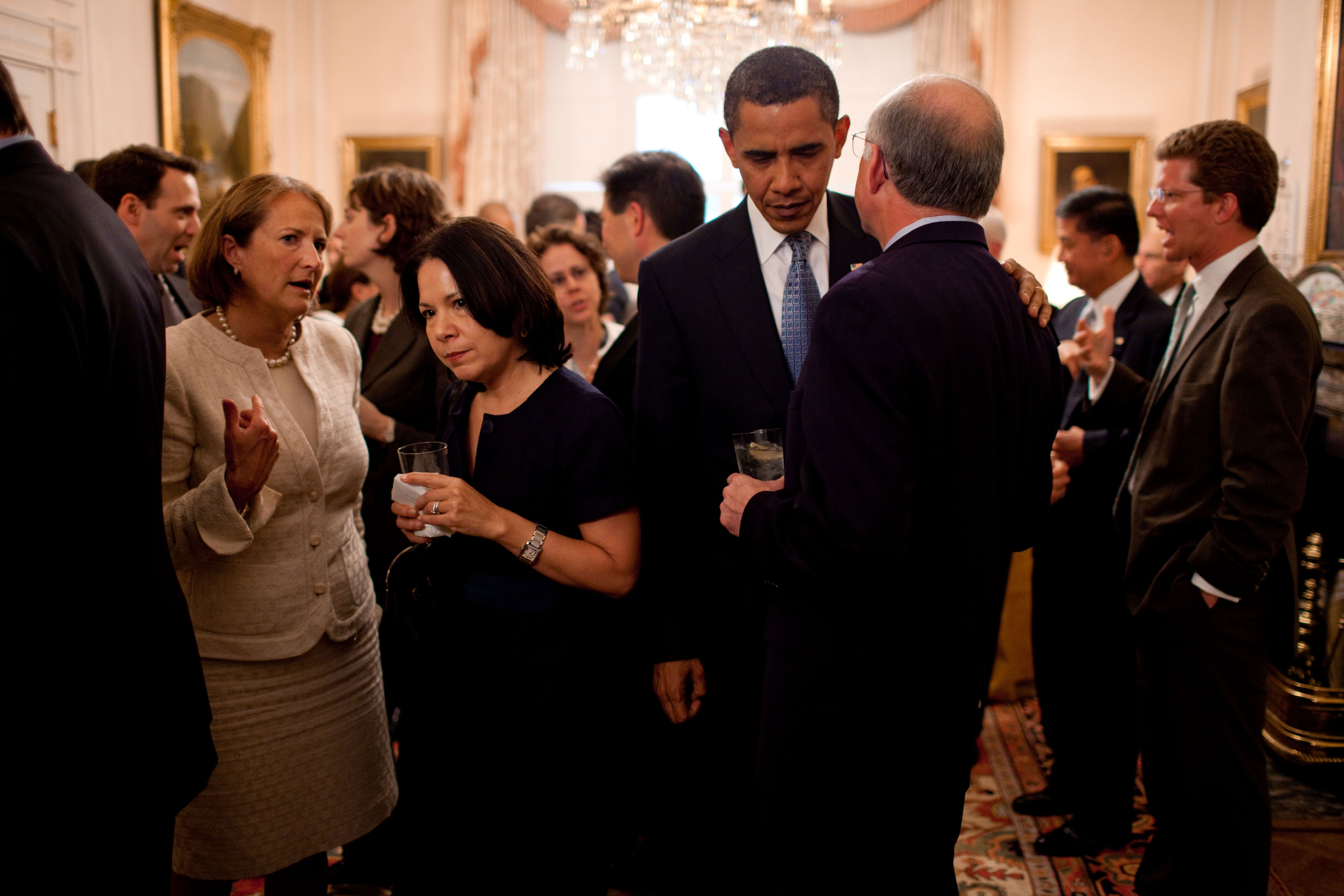
President Obama speaks with Interior Secretary Salazar in one of the Drawing Rooms

== State Offices ==
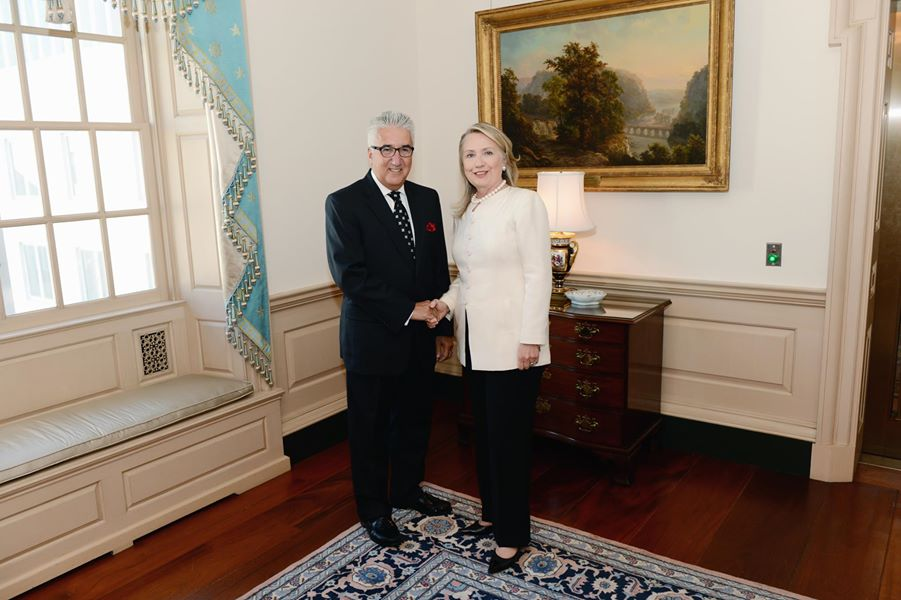
Secretary Clinton poses with Ambassador Cretz in the Treaty Room Suite

In addition to the management of the two heritage assets, the office is responsible for furnishing and maintaining the offices and reception rooms of the Secretary, the two Deputy Secretaries, and the Under Secretary for Political Affairs. Before Fine Arts furnished senior leadership offices, offices were noticeably sparse as Secretary Kissinger describes: "When I was Secretary, the Secretary's office hadn't been rebuilt yet. It was described by somebody as like the boardroom of a medium-seized Midwestern bank. So I frequently took visitors upstairs [to the Diplomatic Reception Rooms] and showed them a more artistic and historic side of America."

== Staff ==
The director of the office retains the title the Director of Diplomatic Reception Rooms.

No.	Name	Dates
1	Clement E. Conger	1961–1992
2	Harry Schnabel, Jr.	1992–1995
3	Gail F. Serfaty	1995–2007
4	Marcee Craighill	2007–2022
5	Virginia B. Hart	2022–present

== Internships ==
The Office of Fine Arts offers paid internship opportunities each year to those enrolled in an accredited college or university.

== See also ==
- Office of Cultural Heritage
- Art in Embassies Program
- Register of Culturally Significant Property
- National Museum of American Diplomacy
- Ralph J. Bunche Library
