= John H. Ottemiller =

American librarian

John Henry Ottemiller (1916–1968) was an American librarian. He wrote the authoritative Ottemiller's index to plays in collections : an author and title index to plays appearing in collections published between 1900 and 1985. He was chief librarian of the Ralph J. Bunche Library.

== Bibliography ==
- The Selective Book Retirement Program at Yale
- Federal services to libraries with Philipps Temple: Federal Relations Committee of the American Library Association, Chicago. (1954)
- Ottemiller's index to plays in collections : an author and title index to plays appearing in collections published between 1900 and 1985
