= Diplomatic Reception Rooms, U.S. Department of State =

Set of rooms in Washington, DC

Diplomatic Reception Rooms
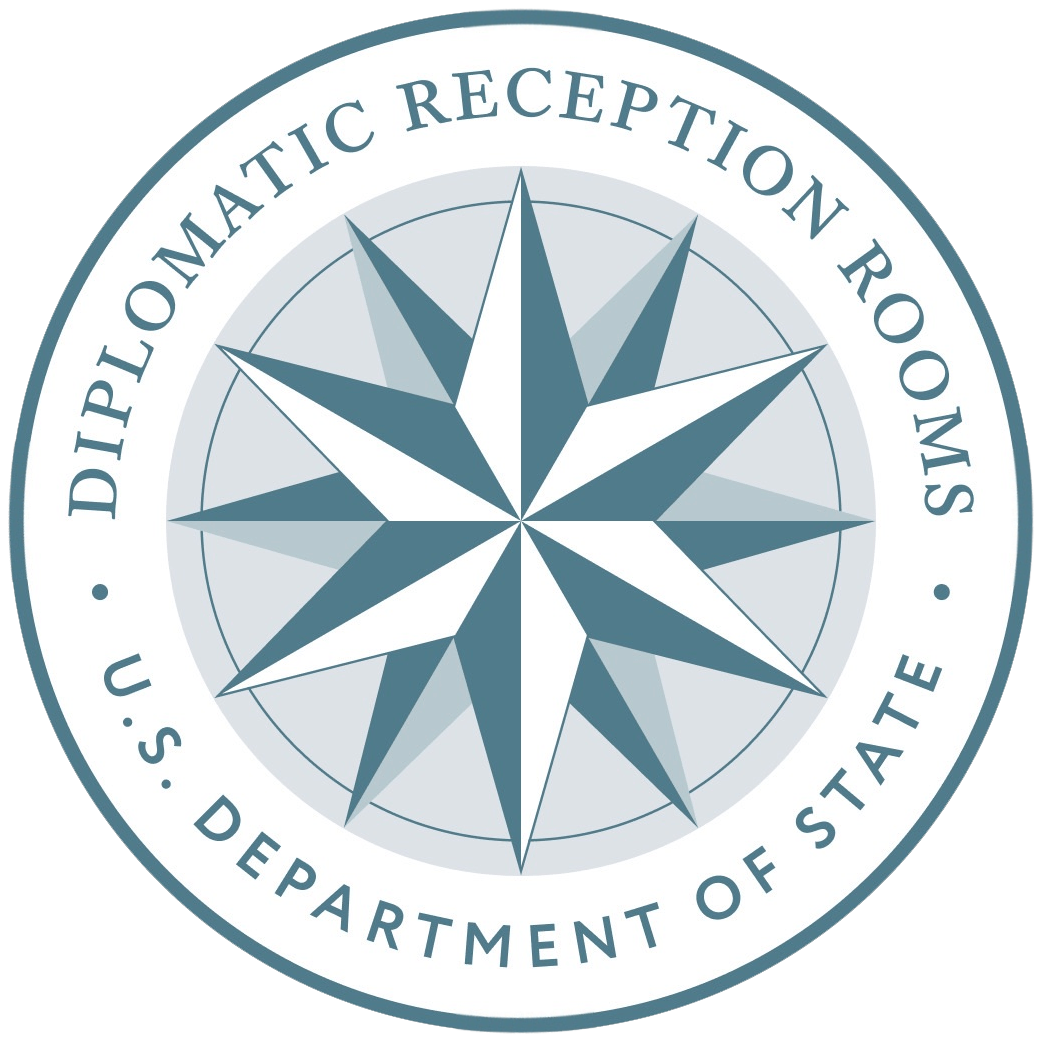

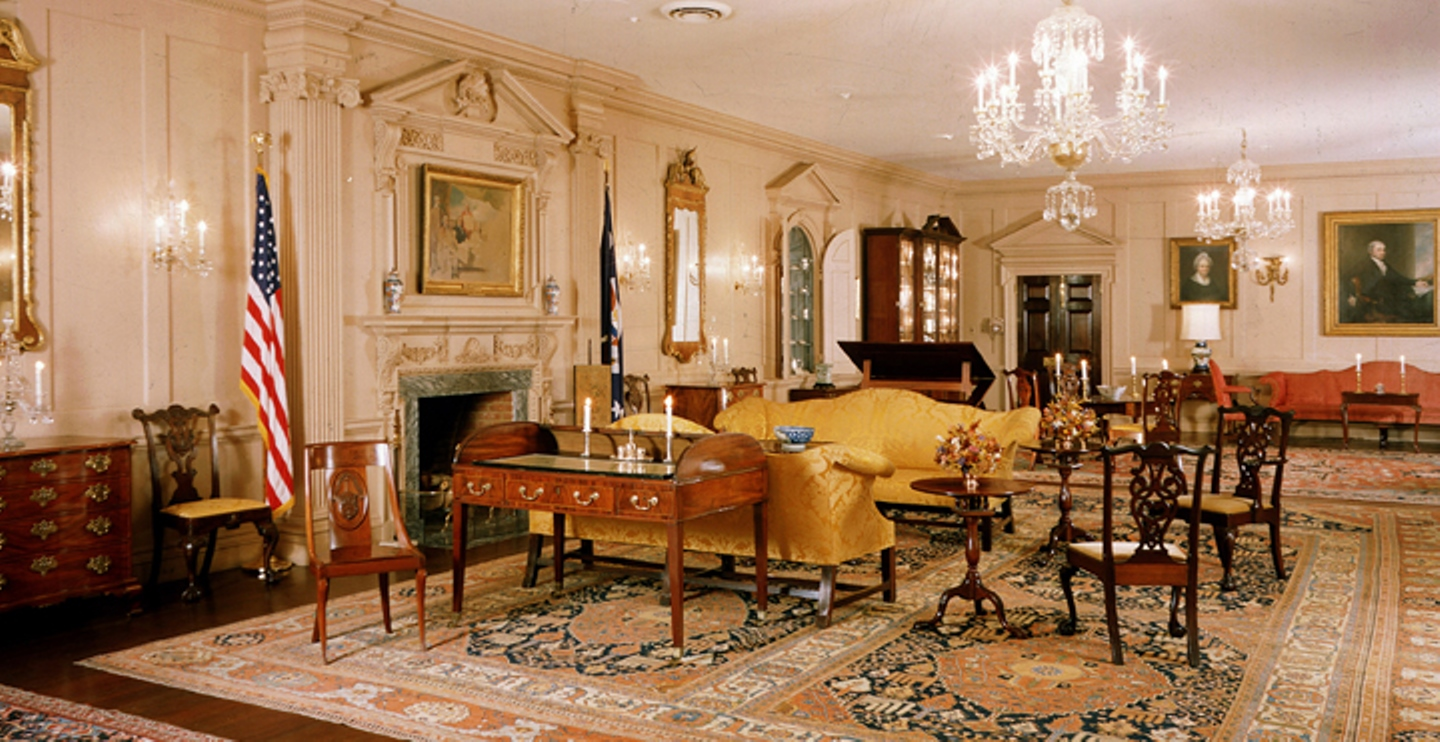
- The John Quincy Adams State Drawing Room features the desk used to sign the 1783 Treaty of Paris, which ended the American Revolutionary War. The painting hanging above the desk depicts Franklin and Adams affixing their signatures to the treaty.
- Interactive fullscreen map
- Established: January 1961
- Location: Harry S Truman Building, Northwest, Washington, D.C., U.S.
- Coordinates: 38.8944°N 77.0484°W
- Type: art, furniture, decorative arts
- Collections: Federal-era American arts
- Visitors: 90,000
- Founder: Clement Conger
- Operator: Office of Fine Arts
- Director: Virginia B. Hart (2024)
- Owner: U.S. State Department
- Public transit access: Foggy Bottom
- Website: diplomaticrooms.state.gov

The diplomatic reception rooms at the United States Department of State are forty-two principal rooms and offices used by the United States Secretary of State in the conduct of diplomacy. Located on the seventh and eighth floors of the Harry S Truman Building in Washington, D.C., the diplomatic reception rooms include one of the nation's foremost museum collections of American fine and decorative arts.

Architect Edward Vason Jones designed several of the rooms between 1965 and 1980. Clement Conger, curator of the collections from 1961 to 1990, assembled many of the art, furniture, and decorative arts objects.

== Management ==
In accordance with Title 22 of the United States Code, Chapter 38, Section 2713(a), the Office of Fine Arts (M/FA) at the U.S. Department of State oversees the art and architecture of the diplomatic reception rooms and administers this museum on behalf of the secretary of state. In addition to the Office of Fine Arts, the Office of the Chief of Protocol administers official visits by guests of the secretary. The facilities themselves apart from their contents are managed by the Bureau of Administration (A/OPR/GSM), which with the Office of Fine Arts reports to the under secretary of state for management.

== Collections ==
Masterpieces in the collections are assembled from the early Federal period, c. 1790–1815. These masterpieces are interwoven into an interpretative narrative that explores U.S. diplomatic history: charting of the new world and the colonial foundations, the nation's road to independence and birth of the United States, and expansion westward over the years 1740–1840. The diplomatic reception rooms are a national treasure that belongs to the American people. It is the people that support the vital activities of the diplomatic reception rooms. Charitable contributions from private citizens, foundations, and corporations support revitalization and expansion initiatives, collections maintenance and conservation, and educational programming.

On September 3, 1783, the Treaty of Paris—establishing peace with Great Britain after the Continental Army prevailed in the American Revolutionary War and won the nation's independence—was signed on a tambour writing table held in the rooms' collections. This diplomatic achievement is depicted in the collection's unfinished painting, after Benjamin West’s 1782 original, The American Commissioners of the Preliminary Peace Negotiations with Great Britain. Hand-wrought silver by patriot-silversmith Paul Revere, porcelain wares from George Washington's Society of Cincinnati, and companion portraits of John Quincy and Louisa Catherine Adams (1816) by artist Charles Robert Leslie are also among the treasures held in the reception rooms' collections.

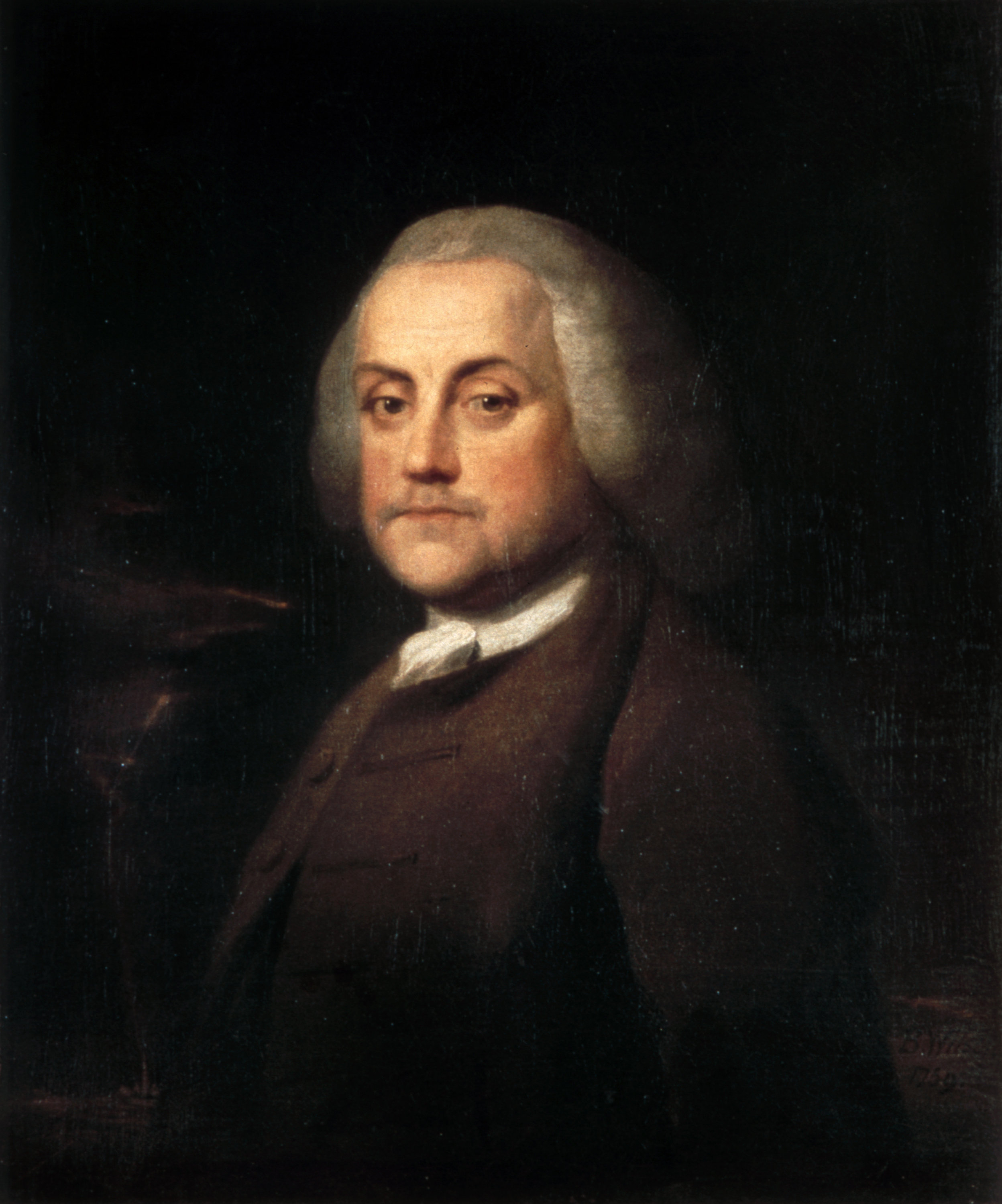
Portrait of Benjamin Franklin (ca. 1760), by Benjamin Wilson.

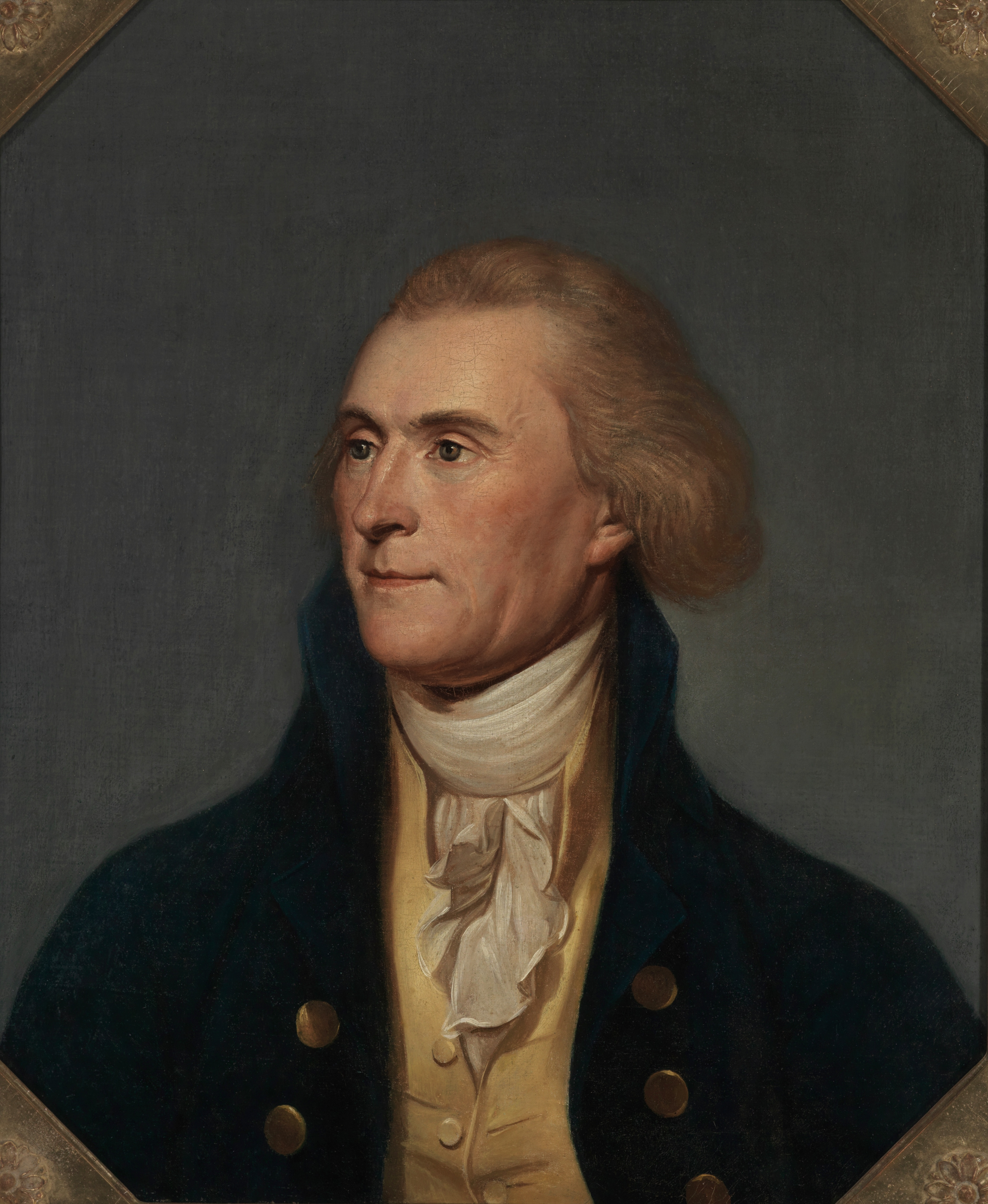
Portrait of Thomas Jefferson (ca. 1791), by Charles Willson Peale.

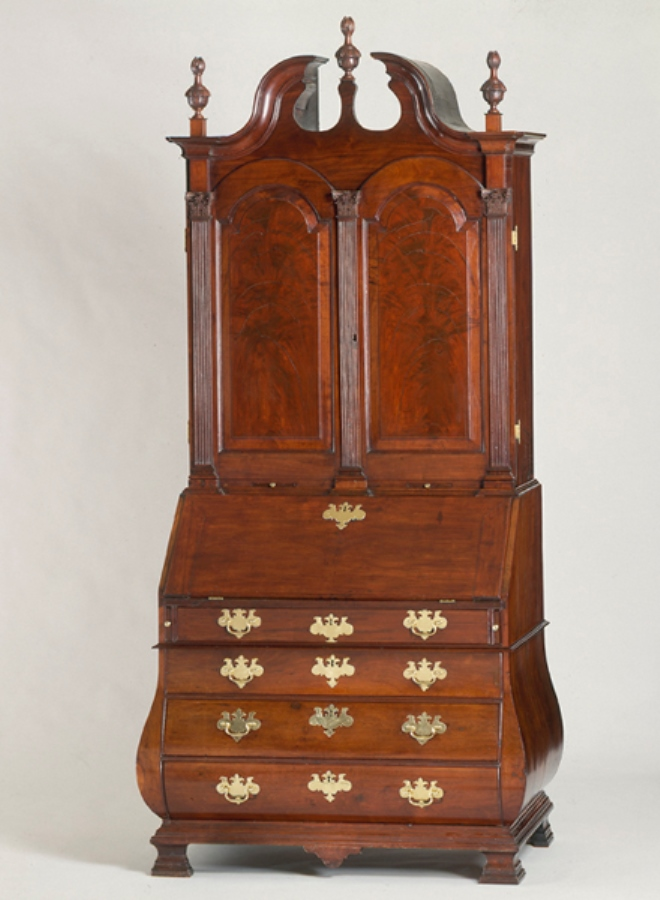
Bombé desk and bookcase (1753), by Benjamin Frothingham Jr., Massachusetts.

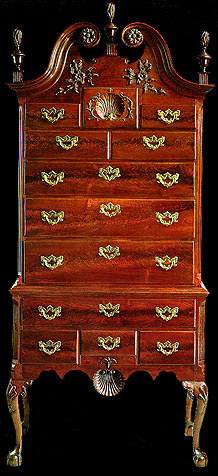
Chippendale high chest (ca. 1760), unknown maker, Philadelphia.

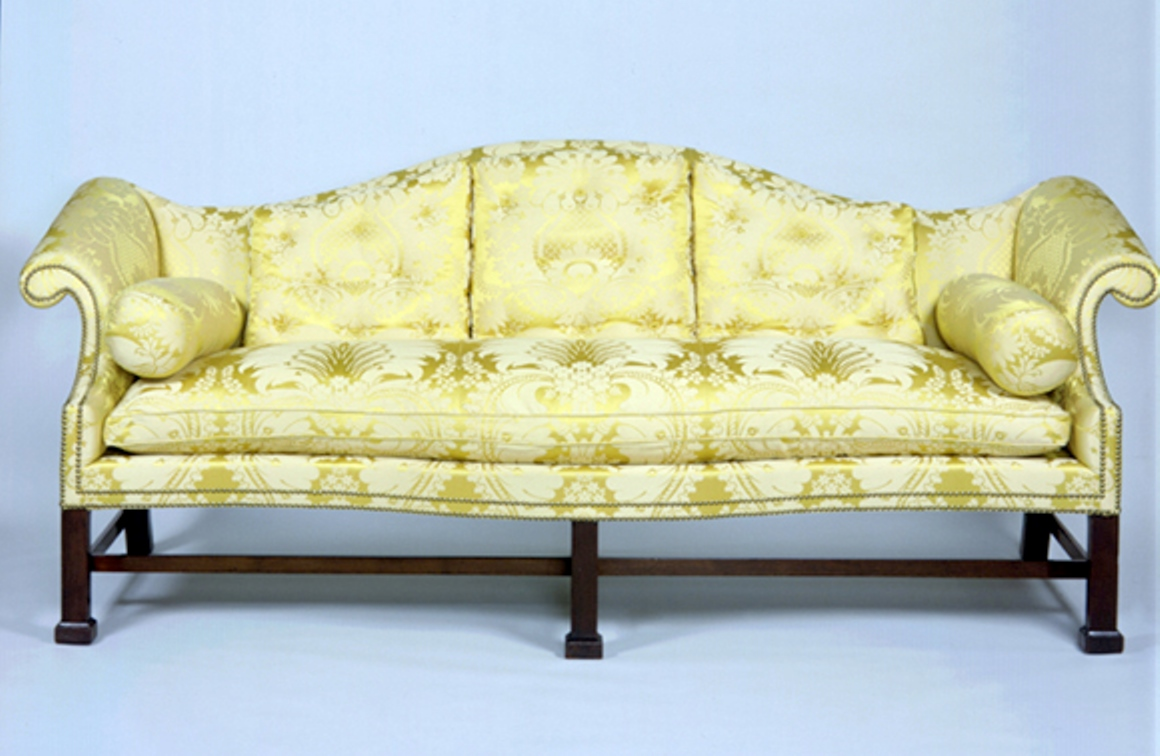
Marlborough-leg camel-back sofa (ca. 1775-1800), attributed to Thomas Affleck, Philadelphia.

== Rooms ==
=== Seventh floor ===
- The Treaty Room

=== Eighth floor ===
- The Edward Vason Jones Memorial Hall
- Entrance Hall
- Passageway
- Gallery
- Walter Thurston Lounge
- Martha Washington Lounge
- Dolley Madison Room
- John Quincy Adams Drawing Room
- Thomas Jefferson Reception Room
- Benjamin Franklin State Dining Room
- James Monroe Room
- James Madison Room
- Henry Clay Room

== Gallery ==
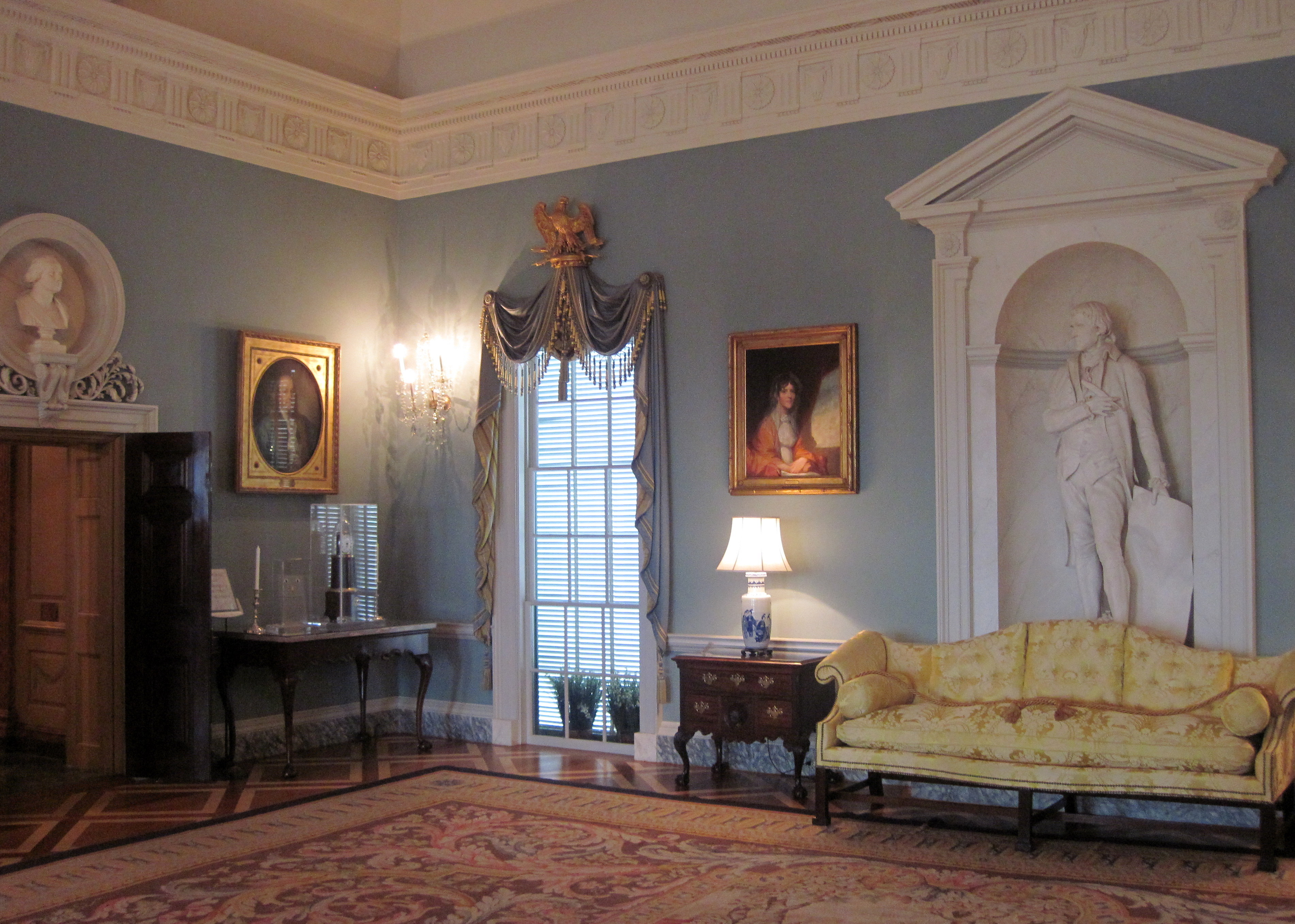
Thomas Jefferson State Reception Room

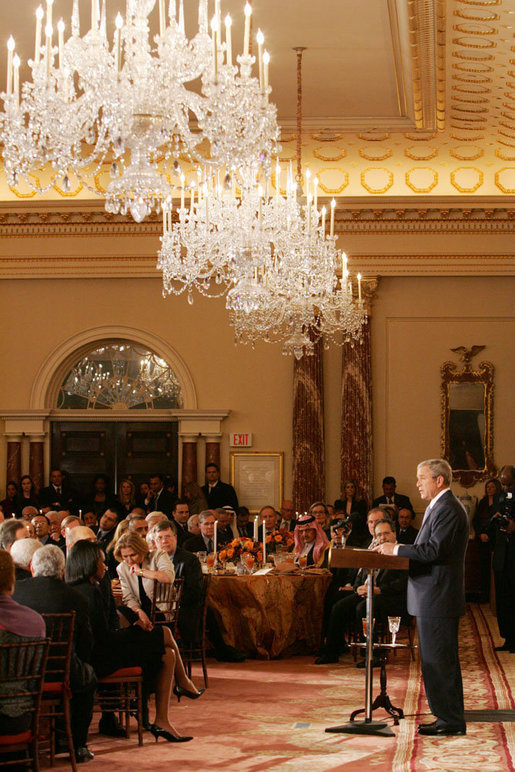
Benjamin Franklin State Dining Room

Edward Vason Jones Memorial Hall

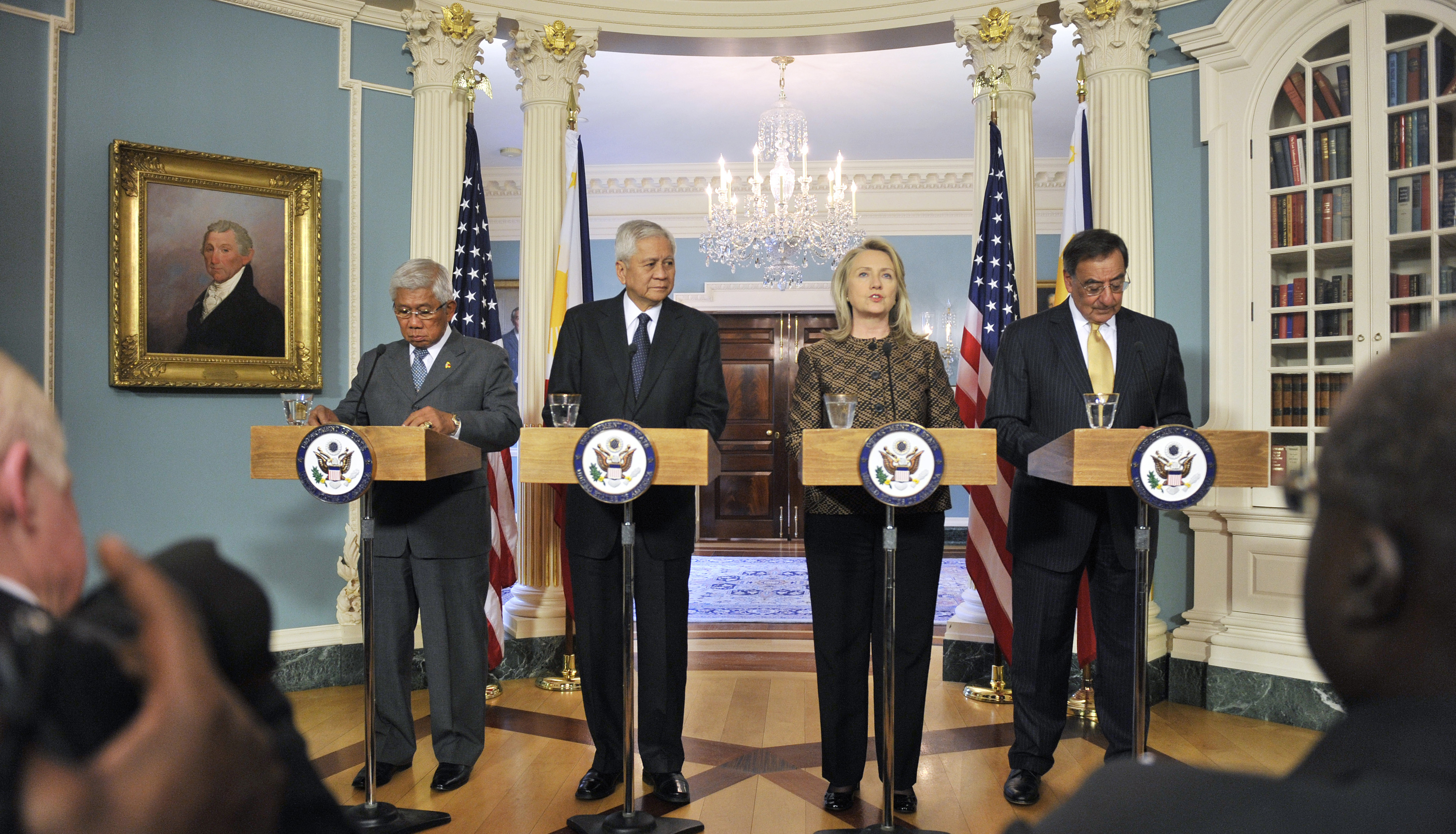
Treaty Room Suite

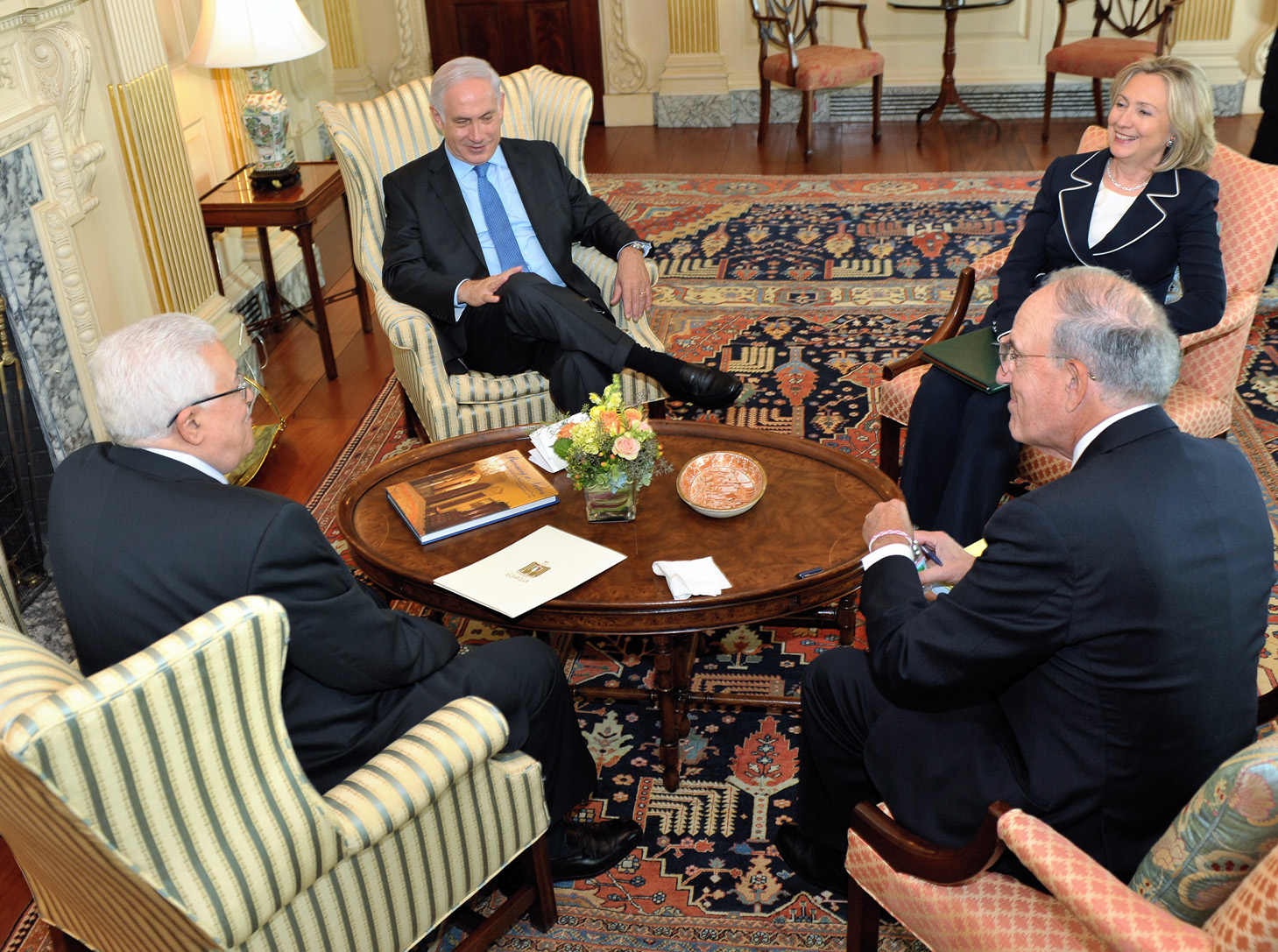
Secretary of State's Office

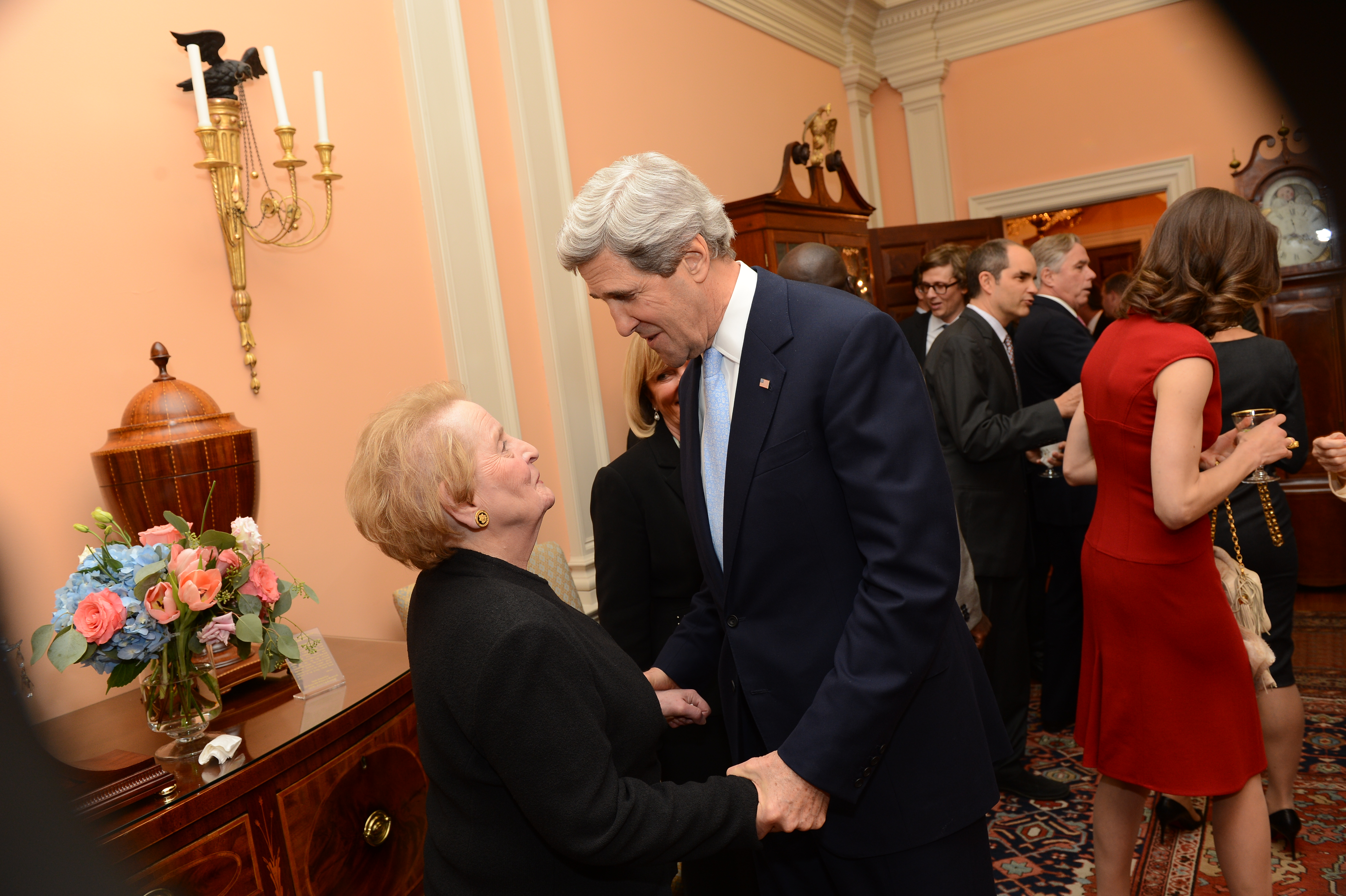
James Monroe Conference Room

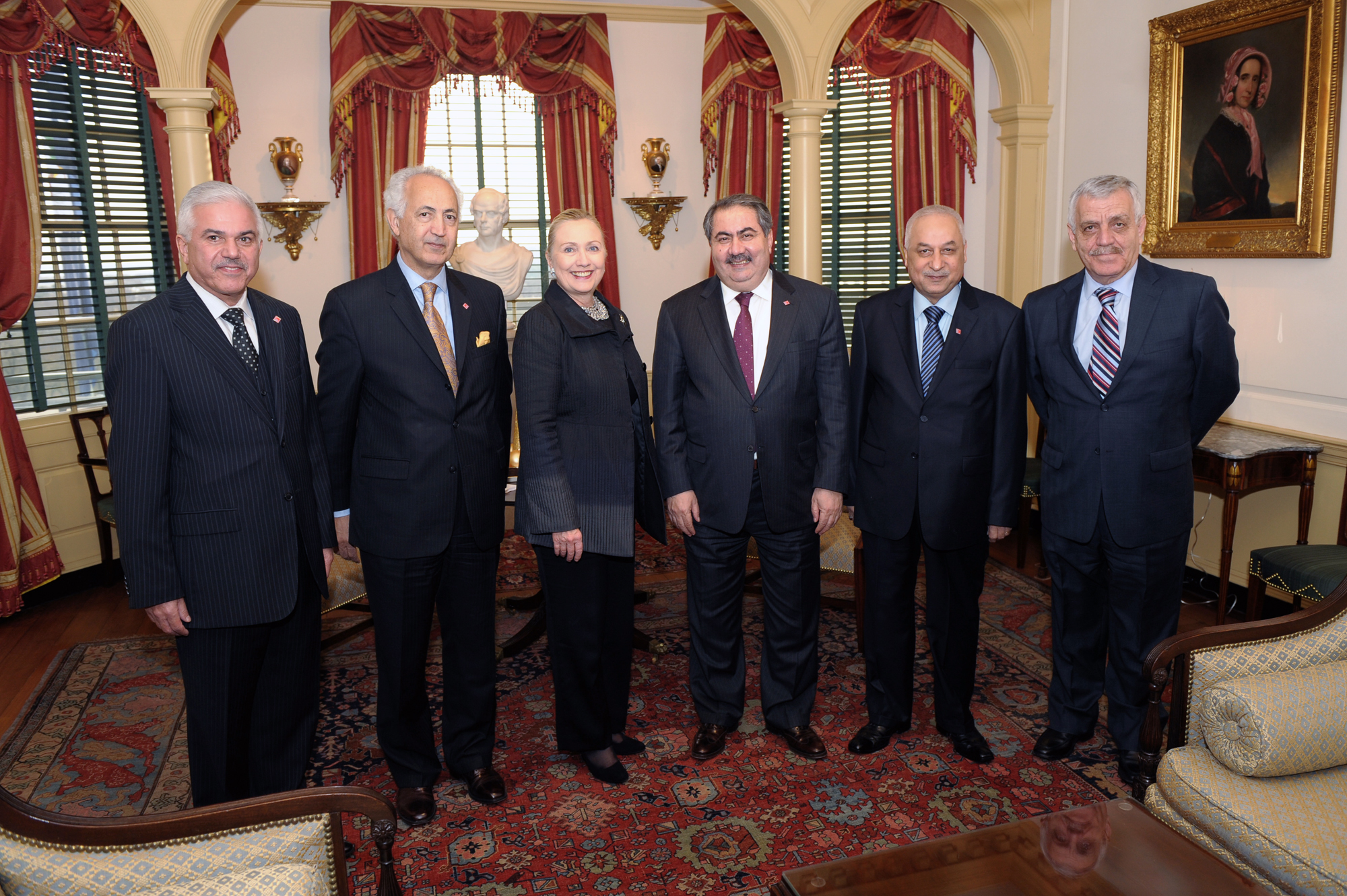
James Madison Dining Room
