= Harry S Truman Building =

US State Department HQ in Washington, D.C.

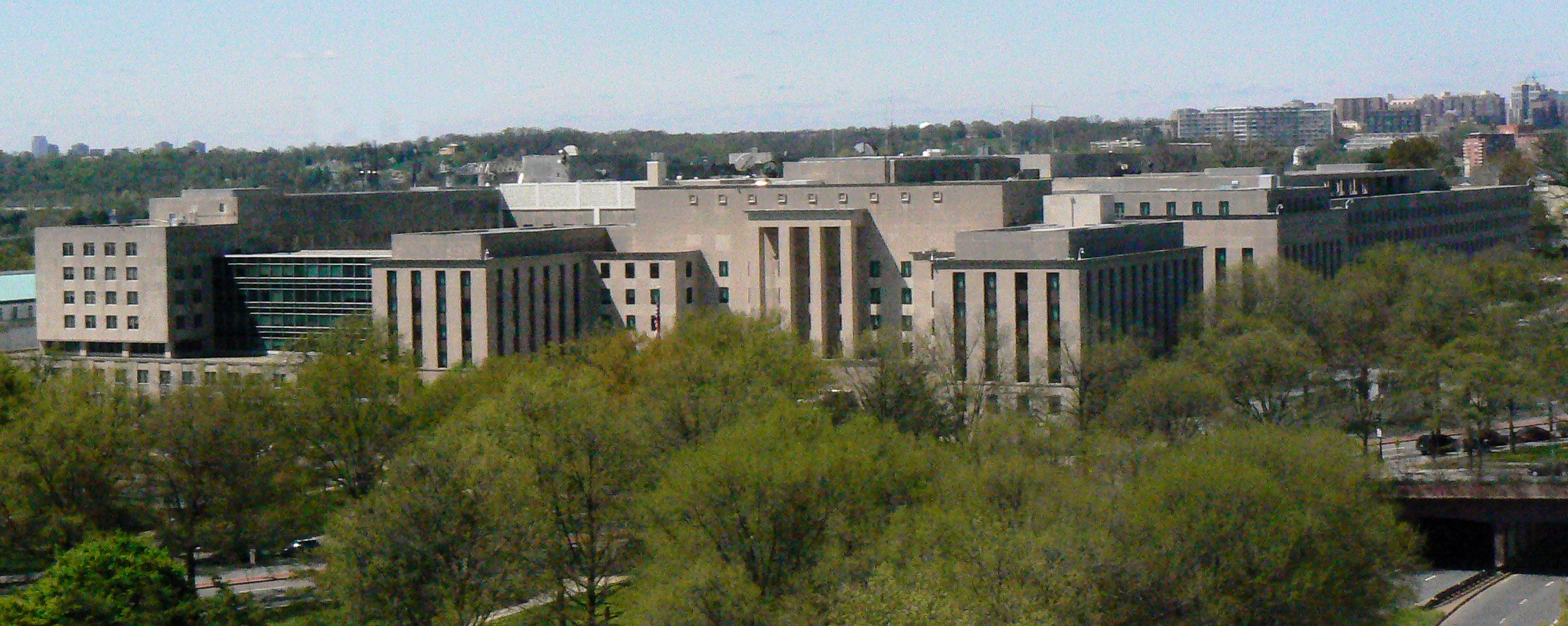
- The Harry S Truman Building in 2008
- Interactive map of the Harry S Truman Building area
- Former names: Main State Building
- Alternative names: State Department building

General information
- Architectural style: Modern Movement; Stripped classical
- Location: 2201 C Street NW; Washington, D.C., U.S.
- Coordinates: 38.8944°N 77.0484°W
- Current tenants: U.S. Department of State
- Construction started: 1939; 87 years ago
- Completed: 1941; 85 years ago
- Renovated: 1960s, 2000s
- Owner: General Services Administration

Technical details
- Size: 12.2 acres (49,000 m^{2})
- Floor area: 2,600,000 square feet (240,000 m^{2})

Design and construction
- Architect: Louis A. Simon
- Other designers: William Dewey Foster; Gilbert Stanley Underwood
- Main contractor: John McShain, Inc.

Other information
- Public transit: Foggy Bottom–GWU station

The Harry S Truman Building is the headquarters of the United States Department of State. It is located in Washington, D.C., and houses the office of the United States secretary of state.

The Truman Building is located in the Foggy Bottom neighborhood at 2201 C Street NW, bounded by C Street to the south, E Street, D Street, and Virginia Avenue to the north, 21st Street to the east, and 23rd Street to the west. It is located to the west of Edward J. Kelly Park and north of the National Academy of Sciences building and the National Mall.

The building—previously known as "Main State" and often called "Foggy Bottom"—was officially named in honor of President Harry S Truman in September 2000.

The building was completed in 1941 and listed on the National Register of Historic Places in 2017.

== History ==
=== Twentieth century ===
During the early 1930s, the National Capital Park and Planning Commission sought to develop the section of the District of Columbia known as Foggy Bottom, located between C, E, 18th, and 23rd streets. Leading up to World War II, the expanding Department of War occupied several different buildings on the mall, making the need for a new building to consolidate operations a high priority. It was always intended to construct the building in two phases, and the Foggy Bottom site was chosen because it was large enough to accommodate both.

Gilbert Stanley Underwood and William Dewey Foster won the contract for the War Department building. They designed the building between 1938 and 1939 and construction began in 1940, with John McShain, Inc. as contractor. The Public Buildings Administration of the Federal Works Agency, which inherited oversight responsibility for the federal buildings program from the U.S. Treasury Department in 1939, completed the first phase of the building in 1941.

During the design process, several agencies expressed concern that the War Department had already expanded beyond the capacity of the building. These concerns turned out to be correct; while some offices of the War Department moved into the building for a few years, the building never became the War Department headquarters. By the time construction was complete, the War Department had already outgrown the building. Congress appropriated funds for construction of the Pentagon early in 1941, the same year the first phase of the building was completed.

The Department of State also grew rapidly during the war (from under 1,000 employees to over 7,000), but was lower in priority and so was scattered all over Washington, occupying forty-seven buildings by the mid-1940s. In 1946, President Truman decided to make use of the space vacated by the War Department's ongoing move to the Pentagon to consolidate the central functions of the State Department in one place; the change of tenants was completed between January and August 1947. The original portion of the building is today referred to as the Marshall Wing.

==== Expansion ====
World War II spurred the growth of this department as well. However, the planned expansion was delayed until Congress allocated funds for the addition in 1955. Harley, Probst Associates, a joint venture between Harley, Ellington, and Day of Detroit and Graham, Anderson, Probst, and White of Chicago, won the contract for the design in 1956. The addition, known as the State Department Extension, was completed in 1960 and dedicated in 1961. The original building was informally called "Old State" with the addition identified as "New State."

=== Twenty-first century ===
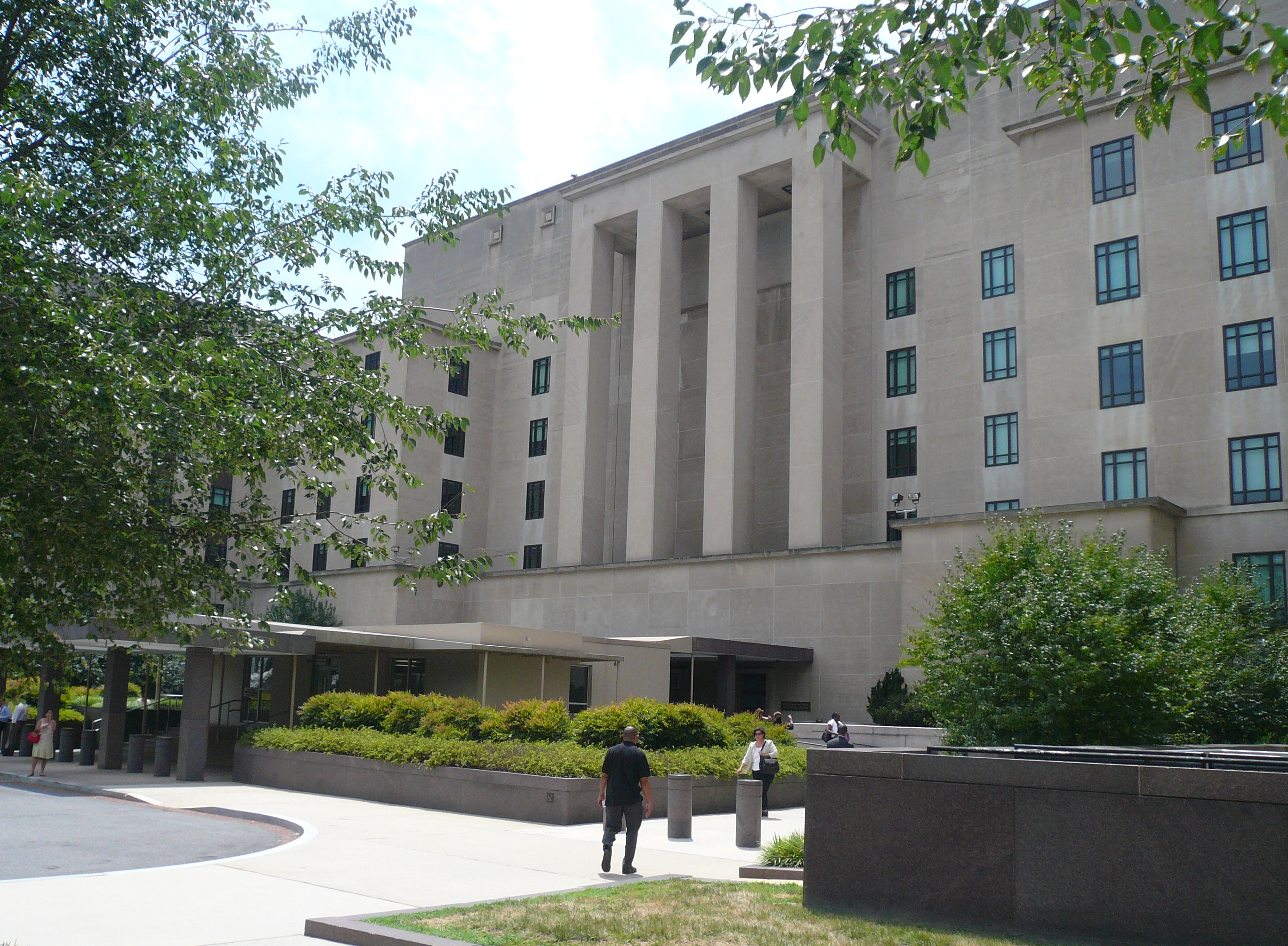
East entrance to the Truman Building

==== Building renovations ====
In 2007, more than 8,000 employees worked in the Truman Building. The building houses 1.4 million square feet (130,000 m^{2}) to 1.507 million square feet (140,000 m^{2}) of usable space, the corridors take up over 267,000 square feet (24,800 m^{2}), and the roof area is about seven acres (28,000 square meters). There are 44 elevators, over 4,000 windows, and about 34,000 fluorescent light fixtures that provide interior illumination.

The building is currently being renovated under a twelve-year plan to modernize the structure. In May 2014, the General Services Administration (GSA) awarded a $25 million contract to build a new public entrance on the east side of the Truman Building. The glass and steel structure acts not only as a high-security entrance to the building but also as a museum about American diplomacy. The 20,000-square-foot (1,900 m^{2}) addition, called the U.S. Diplomacy Center, was designed by the firm Beyer Blinder Belle and constructed by Gilbane Construction. The addition was privately funded by the Diplomacy Center Foundation, a nonprofit established by former secretary of state Madeleine Albright in 2000 to honor American diplomats. The National Capital Planning Commission approved the design in 2011. Construction was completed in 2017. GSA awarded a $77.4 million contract in September 2014 to renovate much of the rest of the structure. Some of the renovations would restructure the interior layout of the building to meet the State Department's needs. However, most of the contract would focus on replacing the building's electrical, elevator, mechanical, plumbing, and telecommunication systems. The refurbishment was scheduled to begin in January 2015 and take 14 months to complete.

== Architecture ==
The original portion of the building, known as the War Department Building, is an example of the Stripped Classical architectural style with Art Moderne elements. The steel-framed building is clad in limestone and rises eight stories above the basement and sub-basement. Because it was designed to be expanded at a later date, it was deliberately asymmetrical. A central spine connects a U-shaped configuration to the east with an E-shaped configuration to the west.

The east entrance is inspired by the main building of the Sapienza University of Rome campus, designed by italian architect Marcello Piacentini and completed in 1935.

The horizontal delineations of the facade reflect the classical precedents of the architectural style. Cornices and pink granite string courses create a base-shaft-capital system. The wings create a series of interior courtyards. The interior courtyard walls are clad in dark granite, emphasizing the transition from base to shaft.

The construction of the State Department extension, completed in 1960, is reinforced concrete and was designed in the International style. Buff colored limestone cladding helps to create a cohesive combination of the two buildings. With the completion of the extension, the building became second to the Pentagon in the number of offices that it houses. Since its completion, access to the main ceremonial entrance and lobby is via the south elevation. The entrance is located off-center toward the west end of the building and is set back to frame a forecourt. The court is paved with a combination of gray and red granite. At either side of the forecourt, a limestone belt course runs the full width of the elevation above the basement and second stories. Limestone piers span the first and second stories.

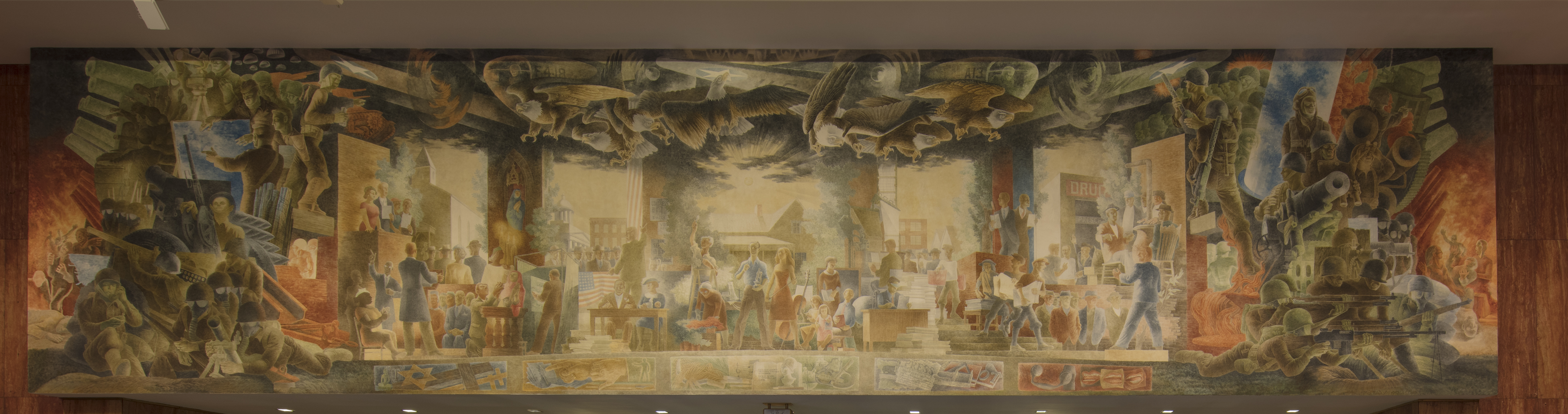
Kindred McLeary's 1942 fresco The Defense of Human Freedoms, commissioned by the Section of Painting and Sculpture for the War Department Building

The east lobby of the original building is a two-story rectangular space surrounded by a screen of paired piers. Four large pendant lights, which are original, are the primary light source. The floors are terrazzo and the walls are travertine. Above the security barriers at the rear of the lobby is a mural by Kindred McLeary titled The Defense of Human Freedoms, which depicts the five freedoms flanked at either end of the mural by their defenders, the American military. Access to the auditorium is via the second floor. The Dean Acheson Auditorium extends upward from the first through the third stories. The stage spans the full east wall of the room. The walls on either side are clad in burled California redwood paneling. The Loy Henderson Conference Room is two stories tall. The walls are Verde Antique marble with brass and bronze accents. A speakers' platform, stepped up at the center, is set along the west wall.

In the lobby of the fifth floor executive office suite is a mural by James McCreery entitled Liberty or Death: Don't Tread on Me. The work is an allegory of the American Revolution, including maps, cannon and other armament, and flags of the era. The eastern section of the fifth floor contains executive office suites for department heads and their staffs. The west side of the corridor includes staff offices and the general council room. The east side of the corridor includes office suites originally designated for the secretary of war and chief of staff.

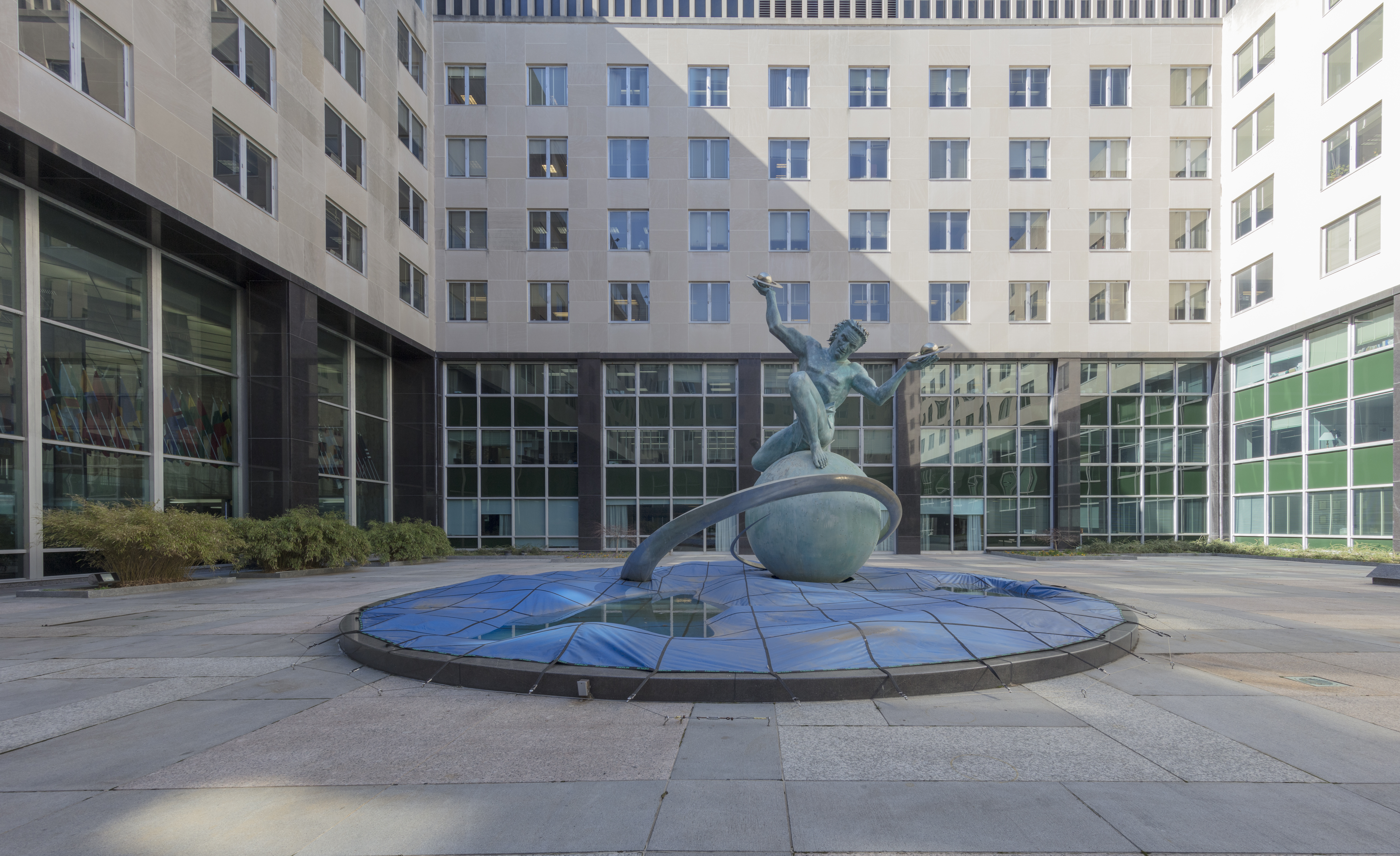
South courtyard featuring The Expanding Universe by Marshall Fredericks

The south courtyard of the building features a sculpture by Marshall Fredericks titled The Expanding Universe, which includes a circular fountain and an architectural bronze statue. A treaty room and the ceremonial office of the secretary of state is on the seventh floor. Diplomatic reception rooms were installed on the eighth floor during the 1980s as reproductions of early American architecture. They are furnished with eighteenth-century antique furnishings and eighteenth- and nineteenth-century artwork.

=== Diplomatic reception rooms ===
The diplomatic reception rooms are a suite of forty-two rooms located on the seventh and eighth floors of the building. These spaces are used for official diplomatic functions hosted by the secretary of state and other senior government officials. The rooms collectively house one of the most significant collections of American fine and decorative arts from the eighteenth and early nineteenth centuries.

The rooms were initially designed and furnished under the direction of curator Clement Conger starting in 1961. Notably, architect Edward Vason Jones contributed significantly to their architectural and interior detailing during his tenure from 1965 to 1980.

== See also ==
- Herbert C. Hoover Building
- Robert F. Kennedy Department of Justice Building
- Treasury Building
- Jamie L. Whitten Building
- Ralph J. Bunche Library
