= Ralph J. Bunche Library =

Library

Coordinates: 38.8944°N 77.0484°W

- Location: Room 3239, Harry S Truman Building, Washington, D.C., U.S.
- Type: Federal Depository Library
- Scope: Foreign relations

Access and use
- Access requirements: Open only to Department of State personnel

Other information
- Website: www.state.gov/about-us-library-services/

The Ralph J. Bunche Library, formerly the State Department Library, is the oldest federal government library in the United States. The library is currently located in room 3239 of the Harry S Truman Building.

== Purpose ==
The library is a Federal depository library with a stated mission "to support the research needs of personnel of the Department of State." Among its resources, the library contains a large collection pertaining to foreign relations. This category includes books about other nations and their governments; about world history; international organizations; wars and international conflicts, especially those involving the U.S.; espionage; world trade relations; foreign assistance and development; treaties and contracts between nations; and American history, particularly as it pertains to the Department of State. The library is not public, but will sometimes lend books to other libraries for public use through interlibrary loan.

== History ==
Source: Ralph J. Bunche Library History by Dan Clemmer accessed on Bunche Library I-net site, December 7, 2007

=== Founding of the department and the library ===
The first executive department to be established under the new Constitution of the United States was the United States Department of State. On a motion by James Madison, and after extensive debate, the act setting up the Department of Foreign Affairs was passed and became law when it was signed by President George Washington on July 27, 1789. On September 15, 1789, a bill was passed and approved by the President which changed the name to the Department of State and significantly expanded its responsibilities.

The library of the Department of State was provided for in the acts of July 27 and September 15, 1789, thus becoming the first federal library. Section Four of the law that created the Department declares that the United States Secretary of State will have custody and charge of all records, books, and papers collected in the past years under the Continental Congress and the government under the Articles of Confederation. This collection of books, official gazettes, and newspapers was the nucleus of the newly founded Department of State Library.

As the first Secretary of State, Thomas Jefferson, developed and expanded the library collection to include statutes of the States and territories of the United States; laws of foreign states; works in history, biography, geography, political science, economics, language, statistics, as well as reference works and periodicals. In 1790 Jefferson estimated Library expenses for the year to be $4 each for 15 American newspapers, $200 to begin a collection of laws of the states, and $25 for the purchase of foreign gazettes and subscriptions to American newspapers that would be sent to American representatives overseas. In that same year, the Library also became, by law, the office of record to receive laws, public documents, and copyrights.

=== Constitution saved from the flames ===
During the War of 1812, the invading British burned the Capital, the White House, and other government buildings including that which housed the State Department and its library on August 24, 1814. While Dolley Madison famously saved the Gilbert Stuart portrait of George Washington hanging in the White House, Secretary of State James Monroe can be credited with saving the Declaration of Independence and Constitution, housed at that time in the State Department's Library.

As the British entered the Chesapeake, Secretary Monroe ordered Chief Clerk John Graham and Stephen Pleasonton to "take the best care of the books and papers of the office which might be in [their] power." In addition to the Declaration of Independence and the Constitution, official records of the Continental Congress and original laws and statutes were hid in hastily made linen bags, loaded onto carts and taken across the Chain Bridge into Virginia. The rescued documents were first hidden in an unoccupied gristmill two miles (3 km) upriver from Georgetown. Fearing the documents were still unsafe, Pleasonton hired horses and wagons from local farmhouses and transported them to Leesburg, Virginia, where they were stored in an empty house, locked and in the safekeeping of Rev. Mr. Littlejohn, until the British retreated from Washington. Reporting to the Congress on November 14, 1814, Secretary Monroe said that "Every exertion was made, and every means employed, for the removal of the books and papers of this office, to a place of safety; and notwithstanding the extreme difficulty of obtaining the means of conveyance, it is believed that every paper and manuscript book of the office, of any importance ... were placed in a state of security. ... Many of the books belonging to the Library of the Department, as well as some letters on file of minor importance ... were unavoidably left, and shared the fate, it is presumed, of the building in which they were deposited."

Although saved from fire, the Declaration of Independence did suffer in years to come from the unanticipated ill effects of exposure and handling. Perhaps the most destructive action occurred in 1823 when the document was used to make a press copy as a master for making facsimile copies to distribute to members of Congress, governors, the Supreme Court and others including the three surviving signers—John Adams, Thomas Jefferson, and John Carroll. As a result of pressing, a large portion of the ink was lifted from the document. Over the years, rolling and folding of the document creased and broke the parchment, and constant exposure to strong sunlight led to fading of the signatures to the extent that some could not be read.

In 1876 the Declaration of Independence was displayed at the Centennial Exhibition in Philadelphia. On March 3, 1877, it was returned to the library where it was kept on view until 1894 when it was hermetically sealed in a locked steel cabinet in the library along with the original signed copy of the Constitution. The documents were not shown to anyone without the approval of the Secretary of State.

On September 29, 1921, the Constitution and the Declaration of Independence were transferred to the Library of Congress. Librarian of Congress Herbert Putnam, eager to receive the documents, came personally to the State Department and carried off both documents in the Library's mail wagon, cushioned by a pile of leather U.S. mail sacks. The documents were displayed in the Great Hall of the Library of Congress from February 1924 until December 1952, when they were transferred to the National Archives.

=== Nineteenth-century development ===
Although many of the library's books perished in the flames of 1814, the library expanded to over 5,000 volumes by 1830, largely through its role as preserver of all copyrighted material. Because of this, the collections of the Department Library grew faster than those of the Library of Congress, which had been established in 1800, although many of the books received for copyright preservation were not within the scope of the Department of State Library's interests.

In 1820 a handwritten catalog of 3,168 titles was published and is now in the library's Rare Book Room. The catalog was organized into two main sections: one an alphabetical section, usually by author, and the other a section of state laws. The first entry in the catalog is The Annual Register (a British publication still being issued) and the last is Xenophon's Cyropedia.

In 1825 Secretary John Quincy Adams appointed Thomas L. Thurston to care for the library, which was in disarray from having been moved so frequently after the fires of 1814. Adams said that he charged Thurston with the "custody of the Library, and directed him to let no book go out without a minute of it being made, and notice given to the person taking it that he must be responsible for its return."

Printed catalogs published in 1825 and 1830 listed 3,905 and 5,239 titles respectively. These catalogs contain the kinds of titles that might be expected in a foreign affairs library: The Ambassador and His Functions, Lewis and Clark-Travels to the Source of the Missouri River and across the American Continent to the Pacific Ocean, London, 1814. But they also contain such titles as Hall's Distiller, Philadelphia, 1818; Denman-Practice of Midwifery, New York, 1821; and Waterhouse-On Whooping Cough, Boston, 1822, which were probably received unsolicited on deposit. The books in the catalogues of 1825 and 1830 are arranged by broad subject areas, but the alphabetic arrangement within those areas is somewhat haphazard.

One of the more curious items in the collection is a handwritten ledger book in which records of loans and returns for the 1820s and the 1830s were maintained. Two of the earlier entries in the ledger show that President Martin Van Buren had returned Kent's Commentaries, Wheaton's Law of Nations, Jones' Sketches of Naval Life, and Bigelow's Elements of Technology. In August 1829, Secretary of State Edward Livingston returned a number of books including Bailey's Latin Lexicon, Webster's Dictionary, and a 12-volume set of Gibbon's Decline and Fall of the Roman Empire. The Secretary of the Treasury returned Marshall's Life of Washington on December 1, 1832. Secretary of State Daniel Webster had 29 volumes "sent to his house" on one day, but the record shows that only one of them was returned.

The Department continued to receive materials for preservation until the copyright function was transferred from the Library to the Department of the Interior in 1859 and then to the Library of Congress in 1870. In recognition of a growing national role for the Library of Congress, the Congress and the President agreed in 1903 to a law that gave government agencies the authority to transfer materials no longer needed for their use to the Library of Congress. Among the very special documents transferred that year from State to the Library of Congress were the papers of Washington, Hamilton, Jefferson, Monroe, Madison, and Franklin. State was no longer able to house and service these valuable papers, acquired for a total cost of $155,000 throughout the nineteenth century.

The collection grew relatively slowly after 1859 because no more books were acquired through copyright deposit and because of limited book budgets. In 1864, for example, the Library was given only $100 to buy books. By 1875 the collection had reached some 40,000 volumes. Theodore F. Dwight, the librarian in at that time, described the collection in the following terms: "The real character of the Library was determined by the necessities of the service. After the organization of the Department of State, a demand was created for works on the law of nations, diplomatic history and the cognate topics, which led to the gradual accumulation of American and foreign histories, voyages, treatises on political science, political economy, and affording liberal information on the subjects of investigation of the Department."

From its founding in 1789, the Department and its library moved from Philadelphia to Princeton to Annapolis to Trenton to New York City before finally moving to Washington in 1800. Between 1800 and 1875 the Department and the Library had eight homes in Washington before it came to rest in the State, War and Navy Building (now called the Eisenhower Executive Office Building) on Pennsylvania Avenue next to the White House.

=== Twentieth century expansion ===
By 1898 the collection had grown to 60,000 volumes. Thanks in part to many Foreign Service officers who acquired material on behalf of the library from all over the world, the library has acquired and continues to maintain a large collection of foreign language materials.

Though well served by the accomplishments and services of such scholars and administrators as Robert Greenhow, Theodore F. Dwight, Frederic A. Bancroft, Andrew H. Allen, John A. Tonner, and Gaillard Hunt, who led the Library from 1834 to 1925, the library entered a new era of development with the appointment of the first career professional librarian, Martha L. Gericke, who served from 1926 to 1948. Distinguished in this period by intensified historical research and the inauguration of a valuable series of publications, the Library saw its collection grow from 120,000 to 300,000 volumes during her tenure. By the time Ms. Gericke retired, the library had become a fully professional organization, with trained staff reorganized along functional lines and the entire collection cataloged and classified.

Following World War II, the research and intelligence functions and staff of the wartime Office of Strategic Services were transferred to the Department of State, along with its Reference Division's library collection and extensive files of classified documents and reports. In July 1948, the library and the Reference Division were consolidated into the Division of Library and Reference Services, with John H. Ottemiller, former head of the Reference Division, as chief. Under his leadership, the Library acquired increased responsibilities and a wider perspective of service. In 1951, Ottemiller noted that "foreign affairs today encompasses consideration, planning and action reaching into all phases of human endeavor and into the remotest areas of the world. While the major subject fields of concern to the Department in foreign areas are economic, political, social, cultural and international organization affairs, the horizon of the Department is broadened today by the new concerns of such problems as military aid and science in international relations." The library's 500,000 bound volumes and one and a half million documents were available to meet the policy and operational needs of the Department. The unique value of the library's collection was revealed when a survey at this time showed that at least one-third of its titles were not duplicated in the Library of Congress.

The Library collection in the years just prior to 1961 could not be accommodated in one location and was split among three buildings. The reference books were kept in a building later razed to make way for the E Street Expressway. The materials classified in the Library of Congress classification scheme A through H, were shelved in the Old Post Office Building on Pennsylvania Avenue, and the remainder, J through Z, in the State, War and Navy Building. A "jeep" messenger service ran between the three buildings, delivering and picking up books several times a day. Finally, in 1961, all the library's books and employees were moved into the new Main State Building (now named the Harry S. Truman Building). For the first time since 1945 the Library was again under one roof, and for the first time since 1875 the Library occupied its own unified quarters. Today the Library with its collection of 600,000 volumes covers more than 45,000 square feet (4,200 m^{2}), including four levels of stacks located between the second, third and fourth floors of the Truman Building.

The introduction of electronic information in the last quarter of the twentieth century brought a new era of library operations and services, with the ability to access information resources beyond those available in the physical facility. As early as 1973, the Library began to take advantage of electronic information services by acquiring the New York Times Information Bank, the first computerized online information retrieval service. By the 1990s, the library was able to access thousands of U.S. and foreign newspapers and magazines, highly specialized biographic and subject information, and U.S. government and think tank documents through commercial and government databases.

=== Organizational home ===
Throughout its history, the library was moved not only physically, but also administratively. In 1833, for example, a Bureau of Pardons and Remissions and of Copyrights was created and charged with various duties including the "arrangement and preservation of books, maps, and other documents and of keeping an accurate catalog." In 1834 the bureau was abolished and its library functions were transferred to the Office of the Translator and Librarian and then to the Home Bureau in 1836. Throughout most of the nineteenth century, the library was administratively located in the Bureau of Rolls and Library, which managed the library, books, documents, orders, laws, and treaties. In 1872, a Division of Indexes and Archives was created to distribute, file and index the Department's correspondence, open the mail, preserve the archives, and retrieve requested papers. An Act of 1874 placed the library administratively side by side with the Department's Archives under the Chief of the Bureau of Rolls and Library. In the 1920s, the library became a branch of the Historical Division, and in 1948 it gained independent status as a Division in the Office of Libraries and Intelligence-Acquisition. In 1973, the library became one of the divisions in the Foreign Affairs Document and Research Center, which brought the library and document activities back together.

=== Rare books and incunabula ===
The Library contains a number of rarely held historical works, which reflect the Library's existence from the earliest days of the federal government. Two books are especially valuable because they are known to have Thomas Jefferson's signature—the Corps Universel Diplomatique and Histoire Des Traites De Paix, published in Holland in the 1720s, both of which managed to avoid destruction in the fire of 1814. These two volumes, along with other rare books in the Library's special collection, have been restored with repairs, cleaning and deacidification, and new period bindings.

The oldest book in the library is the Chronicarum cum figuris et ymaginigus ab incipio mundi, commonly called the Nuremberg Chronicle. Published in 1493 in a Latin edition for the wider European market and a German edition for local readers, the 600-page book is an illustrated encyclopedia of world history and geography. The text of this enormous book was written by Dr. Hartmann Schedel, a German humanist and physician trained at the University of Padua. Schedel divided his work into the seven ages of man, beginning with Adam and Eve and ending with the Apocalypse and the appearance of the Antichrist. Events in 1493 are included, such as the conquest of Constantinople and the maritime explorations the Portuguese, though there is no mention of Columbus' voyage of 1492. Schedel left two blank pages at the end for recording the rest of history.

The Chronicle, which contains the first printed map of Europe, is the Library's only piece of incunabula, the Latin word for books published with moveable type before 1501 (including Gutenberg's Bible, published in 1455). Theodore Dwight, then the Department Librarian, purchased the Chronicle in 1880 or 1881 from a London bookseller for "a few pounds" according to a note inserted into the book.

The Library's special collections also include historical works and travel commentaries about foreign lands, including the Historia General del Peru of 1722 and a collection of nineteenth century travels throughout Persia transferred to the library from the former US Embassy in Tehran.

=== Honoring Dr. Ralph J. Bunche ===
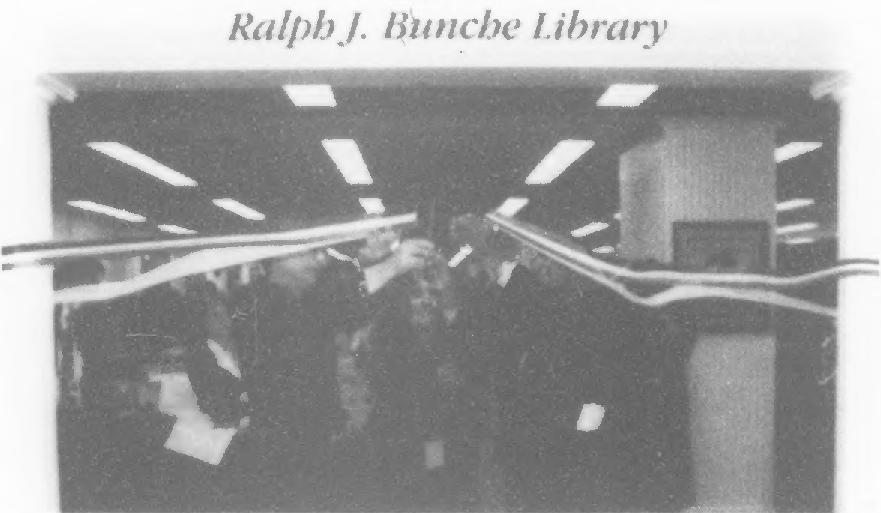
Ribbon-cutting ceremony for the renamed library in 1997

On May 7, 1997, the Department named the library in honor of Dr. Ralph J. Bunche in recognition of his political and humanitarian contributions to the Department of State and the United Nations, and of his contributions to the world of learning. Bunche graduated at the top of his class at the University of California at Los Angeles. At Harvard University he was the first African-American to receive a doctorate in political science, and he later became chairman of the Department of Political Science at Howard University. Active in the Civil Rights Movement, Bunche was also a leading expert on European colonialism in Africa. Bunche served in the State Department as the Director of the African Section of the Office of Strategic Services. He was involved with the United Nations from its beginning, serving as the principal author of two chapters of the UN charter-one on trusteeship and the other on non-self-governing territories. For brokering an armistice between Israel and its Arab neighbors, Bunche was awarded the Nobel Peace Prize in 1950; he was the first person of color to receive this highest of honors. He also served as a United Nations mediator in Egypt, the Congo, and Yemen.

Bunche was born in Detroit, Michigan, on August 7, 1904, and died in New York City on December 9, 1971. At the time of his death, he was the United Nations Under Secretary-General.

Perhaps Bunche's best-known quote is taken from "That Man May Dwell in Peace", a speech from a college debate in 1926 at UCLA.

What vast, undreamed of achievement might await man would he but devote his entire interest to promoting the commonweal of a universal human brotherhood.

In his Nobel Peace Prize Lecture, "Some Reflections on Peace in Our Time", delivered in 1950, Bunche urged the nations to employ reason in their dealings with each other:

The United Nations does not seek a world cut after a single pattern, nor does it consider this desirable. The United Nations seeks only unity, not uniformity, out of the world's diversity. There will be no security in our world, no release from agonizing tension, no genuine progress, no enduring peace, until, in Shelley's fine words, "reason's voice, loud as the voice of nature, shall have waked the nations."

=== Library chronology ===
- 1789 – Library formed under direction of Thomas Jefferson, first United States Secretary of State.
- 1814 – The Department and its library were burned by the British during War of 1812. The United States Constitution and the Declaration of Independence were saved from destruction.
- 1820 – First library catalog, in manuscript, compiled; contained 3,168 titles.
- 1830 – Printed library catalog; contained 5,239 titles.
- 1834 – Papers of George Washington were acquired. In later years, the papers of Thomas Jefferson, James Madison, James Monroe, Alexander Hamilton, and Benjamin Franklin were acquired. In 1903, they were transferred to the Library of Congress.
- 1859 – Copyright function moved from State to the United States Department of the Interior and then to the Library of Congress in 1870.
- 1875 – Library moves to the State War and Navy Building (now the Eisenhower Executive Office Building).
- 1922 – The original copies of the Declaration of Independence and the Constitution were transferred to the Library of Congress.
- 1926 – First professional librarian, Martha L. Gericke, was appointed.
- 1961 – Library moves into New State Building (now Harry S Truman Building).
- 1973 – The New York Times Information Bank, the first computerized information retrieval service, was installed in the Library.
- 1978 – The International Relations Dictionary was compiled by the Library to help find the definitions of new or obscure terms. The first edition was followed by a second and third edition.
- 1991 – A new electronic Online Public Access Catalog was installed.
- 1997 – The Library was named in honor of Dr. Ralph J. Bunche, one of the most gifted and prominent statesmen of the 20th century, who won the Nobel Peace Prize in 1950.
- 2000 – The electronic catalog was made available on the Department's I-Net Intranet.
- 2005 – Bunche Library merges with the Law Library.

Source: Ralph J. Bunche Library History by Dan Clemmer accessed on Bunche Library Inet site, December 7, 2007

== Sources ==
- Ralph J. Bunche Library
- Ralph Bunche Centenary
