= Executive Residence =

Central building of the White House complex

Coordinates: 38°53′52″N 77°02′11″W

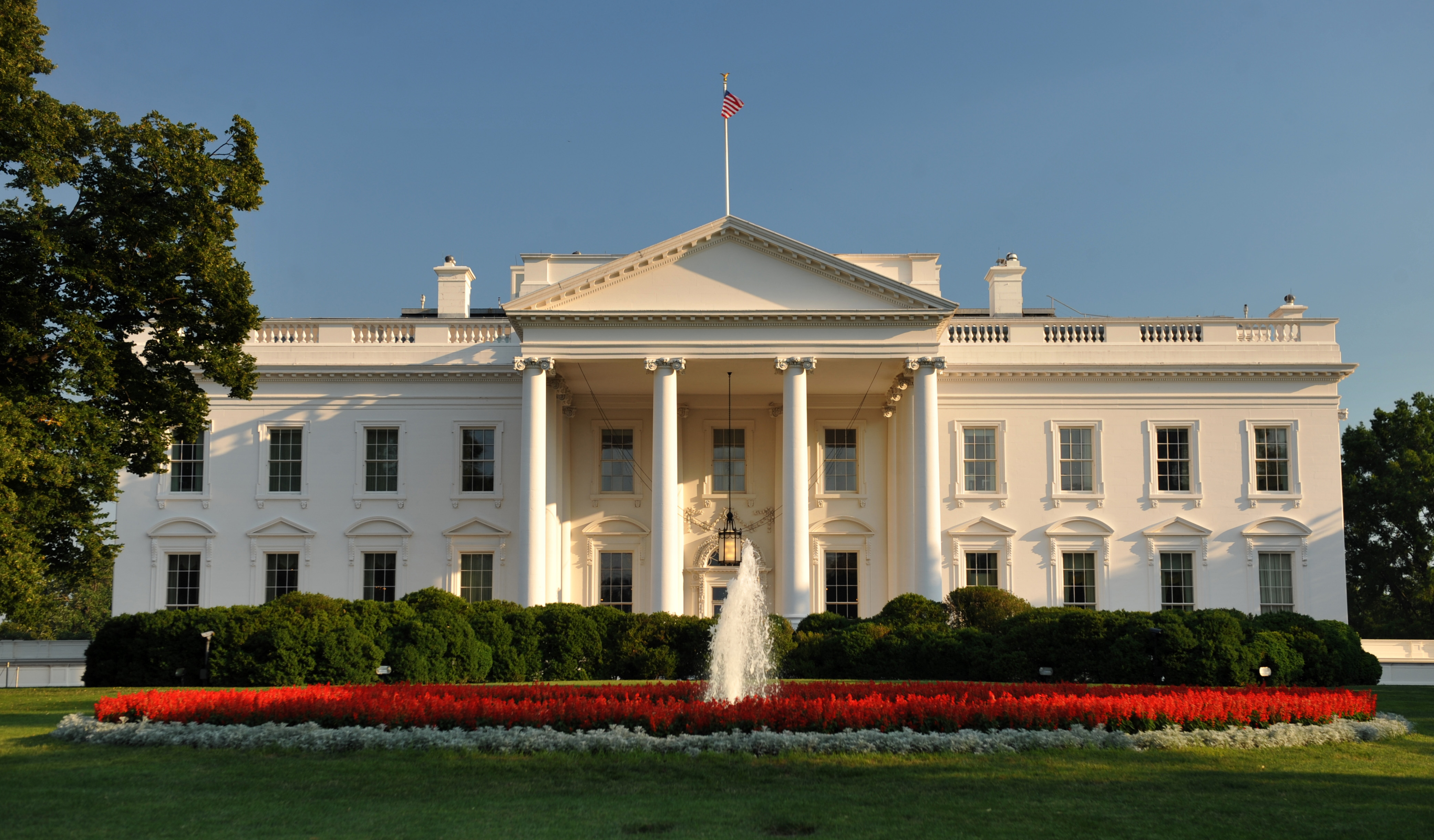
North facade of the White House Executive Residence

White House ground floor showing location of principal rooms

White House state floor showing location of principal rooms

White House second floor showing location of principal rooms

The Executive Residence is the central and most distinctive building in the White House complex, serving as the living quarters for the president of the United States and the first family. It also receives foreign ambassadors and heads of state on diplomatic missions. The Executive Residence was first constructed from 1792 to 1800. It primarily occupies four floors: the ground floor, the state floor, the second floor, and the third floor. The third floor was created in 1927 from attic space. A sub-basement with a mezzanine, created during the 1948–1952 Truman Reconstruction, is used for HVAC and mechanical systems, storage, and service areas.

== Sub-basement and sub-basement mezzanine ==
This level was added during the 1948–1952 renovation, and contains the air conditioning and water softening equipment. The sub-basement and mezzanine also contain storage areas, the heating system, elevator machinery rooms, an incinerator, a medical clinic, a dentist's office, the electrical control system, a laundry room, and flatware and dishware storage.

== Ground floor ==
=== Original kitchen and ancillary spaces ===
The ground floor of the White House originally contained service rooms. The White House is built on a small slight hill that slopes to the south. To provide access to the north side of the ground floor, the area around the north side of the mansion and its northeast and northwest corners was excavated to provide light and air to this half of the ground floor. Architect James Hoban designed the ground floor so that the kitchen was directly beneath the Entrance Hall, the door to the kitchen below the North Portico. Storerooms were east of the kitchen, while a toilet and dishwashing room were to the west. The kitchen was relocated into the two rooms in the northwest corner of the ground floor by 1846, while the old kitchen space was transformed into an informal sitting room/reception space. As of 2010, this large central space, originally occupied by the kitchen in the early 1800s, had been subdivided into offices for the White House curator and the United States Secret Service. The kitchen, too, continues to occupy the three rooms, somewhat altered in size now, in the northwest corner of the ground floor.

The storeroom to the east of the kitchen became a pantry in 1809, a meat locker in 1825, and then a flight of stairs leading to the state floor by 1946. This area remains largely unchanged as of 2010, with the exception of the narrowing of the stairs in 1952 to create an elevator shaft.

=== Library and ancillary spaces ===
The storeroom in the northeast corner of the ground floor remained in use as storage space only until 1809, when it became a laundry. In 1902, President Theodore Roosevelt hired the architectural firm of McKim, Mead & White to renovate the White House. They turned the room into a "gentleman's anteroom". This room became the White House Library in 1935. First Lady Jacqueline Kennedy radically transformed the room in 1961. Kennedy consulted initially with a group consisting of members of the United States Commission of Fine Arts, designers from the American Institute of Interior Designers (AIID), and historians. The AIID agreed to take on the job of refurbishing the room, and Kennedy worked with decorator Jeanette Becker Lenygon of the AIID on the project. Lenygon designed an early American library room in the Federal style. Except for minor decorative changes, the White House Library remains the same as of 2010.

The toilet and laundry room west of the kitchen became general-use work areas by 1809, and a pantry, small kitchen, and cook's office by 1825. By 1946, these had become general workrooms, with a narrow, winding staircase inserted into the room closest to the former kitchen. The 1952 renovation turned the winding staircase into a steep, straight stairs and added an elevator in this space. As of 2010, a pantry-sized refrigerator also occupied a portion of this space.

=== Diplomatic Reception Room ===
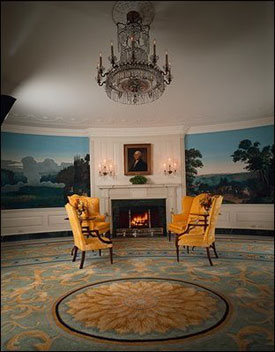
The Diplomatic Reception Room on the ground floor of the White House

The oval space beneath what is now the Blue Room was originally a Servants' Hall, but was turned into a furnace room in 1837. During the White House's 1902 renovation, the room was turned into a sitting room. President Franklin D. Roosevelt used it for his "fireside chat" radio broadcasts in the 1930s. Rebuilt (along with the rest of the gutted White House) during the 1948-to-1952 renovation, the room became the Diplomatic Reception Room. It was only sparsely furnished until First Lady Mamie Eisenhower received a large donation of museum-quality antique furniture from the National Society of Interior Designers in 1960. Except for decorative updating, it remains unchanged as of 2010.

=== Map Room ===
West of the Servants' Hall, the ground floor originally contained a small bedroom and, in the two westernmost rooms, a Steward's Office. The smaller, westernmost of the two rooms in the Steward's Office became the White House vault. By 1825, the Housekeeper's Office had moved into the easternmost room of the Steward's Office. The Steward's Office and vault became general workrooms by 1946, but the 1902 renovation had turned the Housekeeper's Office into a ladies' powder room. Less than a decade later, President Woodrow Wilson turned it into a billiards room. At the outbreak of World War II in December 1939, President Franklin Roosevelt removed the billiards table and turned the room into a place where he could keep track of the war's progress on a wide range of maps and store top-secret communications with world leaders. The Map Room (as it was now called) was heavily guarded, as highly secret US and allied military information was constantly updated on the maps kept in this room. In the early 1960s, the Map Room was transformed into a ladies' powder room again by Jacqueline Kennedy, and portraits of first ladies were hung there. The Map Room continued to retain its name, but in 1970 was decorated in the Chippendale style and turned into a reception room. It retained its name and function as of 2010. A small medical clinic and the office of the White House physician occupy the three rooms to the west of the Map Room as of 2010.

=== China Room and Vermeil Room ===
East of the original Servants' Hall was the Housekeeper's Office, and then a room for general work. The Housekeeper's Office was turned into general workspace in 1809, while the bedroom became a general-use servants' room. All rooms east of the oval Servant's Hall were turned into staff bedrooms by 1825 (with the Housekeeper's Office taking up a portion of the Steward's Office). In 1837, President Martin Van Buren made the bedroom that would become the China Room into quarters for a stoker, whose job was to keep the White House furnace fueled 24 hours a day, seven days a week (with summers off). First Lady Edith Wilson turned this room into the China Room in 1917 to display the Executive Residence's growing collection of White House china. Just east of the China Room, the 1902 renovation turned the staff bedroom into a sitting room known as the Social Room. It was briefly renamed the Billiard Room after the 1952 restoration, but became the Vermeil Room in 1957 after mining heiress Margaret Thompson Biddle bequeathed 1,575 pieces of vermeil silverware to the White House. It remained little changed as of 2010.

=== North Lawn extension ===
During the 1948-to-1952 reconstruction of the White House, additional White House workspace was excavated under the North Lawn. Storage space had first been excavated here in the 1930s, but was greatly expanded and enhanced during the Truman renovation. The Trumans included a bowling alley in this space as well (it is architecturally aligned with the entrance to the Diplomatic Reception Room on the other side of the White House). President Dwight Eisenhower had the bowling alley moved to the Executive Office Building west of the White House, but President Richard Nixon (an avid bowler) had it restored to its original spot in 1969. As of 2010, this space continues to house the bowling alley, as well as the White House chocolatier, the office and workspace of the White House chief floral designer, a cold storage room for flowers and other perishable items, a carpentry shop, and general workrooms.

== State floor ==
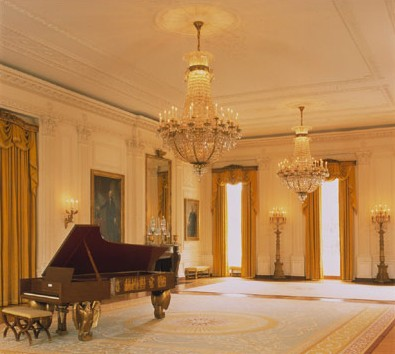
The East Room after its last redecoration in 1995

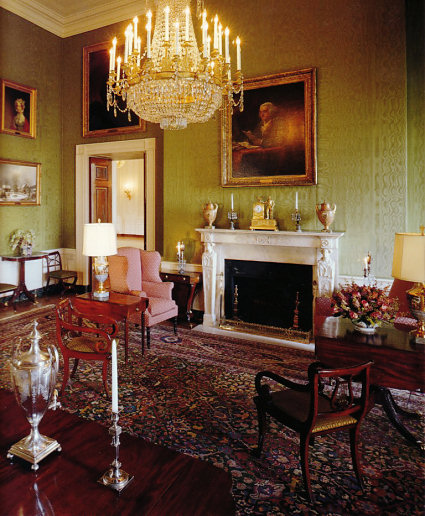
The Green Room in 1999

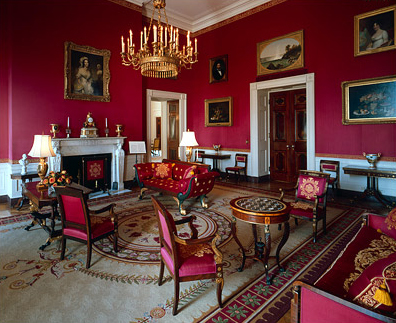
The Red Room during the George W. Bush administration

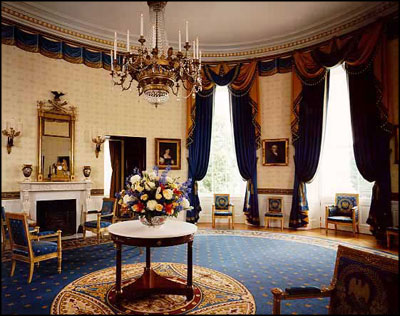
The Blue Room after its 1995 redecoration

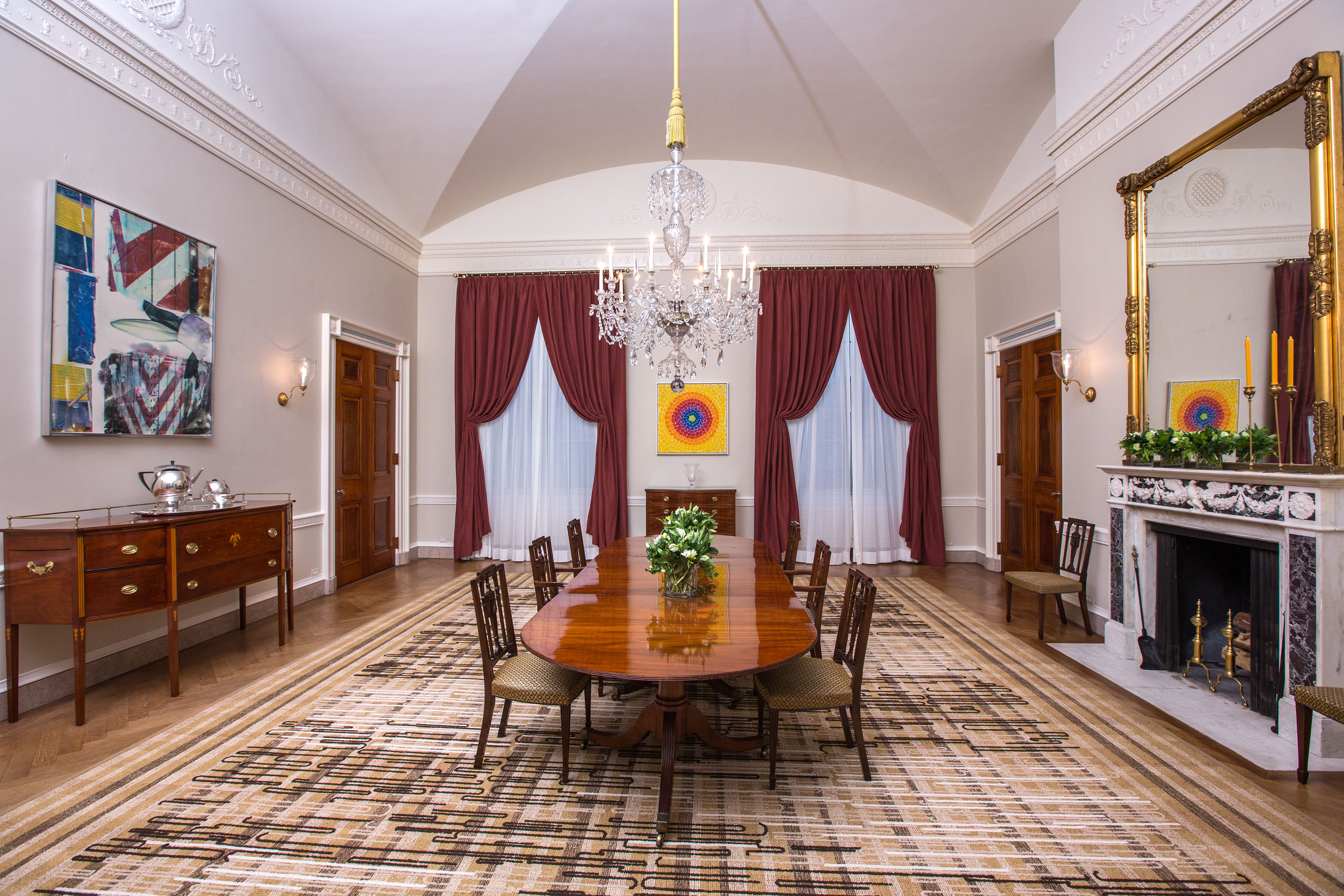
The Family Dining Room after its February 2015 redecoration

The state floor was unfinished when President John Adams moved into the White House on November 1, 1800. Work continued through the four remaining months of his presidency and into the first term of Thomas Jefferson to make the Executive Residence habitable. There were no floors in the East Room, the Blue Room, or the western third of the Cross Hall (which at that time extended all the way to the west, as the State Dining Room would not be extended all the way north until 1902). There was also no grand staircase east of the Entrance Hall, and the only way to access the second floor was via temporary stairs on the exterior of the building which led up to the top of the South Portico.

=== Entrance Hall and Grand Staircase ===
Until the North Portico was completed in 1829, providing access from the North Lawn and carriageway, the Entrance Hall was used as space to exhibit items brought back by the Lewis and Clark Expedition. A glass screen was placed between the columns along the Entrance Hall's south side in 1837 to reduce the hall's draftiness, effectively reducing its apparent size. A more elaborate iron frame was added to the partition in 1853. The ordinary glass and frame were replaced by a red, white, and blue colored glass screen designed by Tiffany & Co. in 1882. The Tiffany screen was removed in the 1902 renovation.

The area that now contains the Grand Staircase originally contained a much smaller, unadorned staircase to the second floor. The Grand Staircase was moved into this area during the 1902 renovation.

=== East Room ===
Although architect James Hoban included space for the East Room in his 1792 plans for the White House, it was unclear what purpose the room should fulfill. The room's floor was finished after President John Adams moved in, but the walls remained bare brick and First Lady Abigail Adams famously hung her laundry to dry in it.

Thomas Jefferson furnished the room with some chairs during his administration, and had the room partitioned (using canvas and sailcloth for walls) and the southern end used for a bedroom and office for Meriwether Lewis and Lewis Harvie (both private secretary to the president). (Note: Jefferson also asked Latrobe to design permanent partitions for the East Room in 1807. Latrobe did so. It is widely assumed that these were never implemented, but Phillips-Schrock argues, based on photographs taken during the mansion's 1952 reconstruction, that these alterations were in fact implemented in the northern half of the East Room.) But it wasn't until 1807 that architect Benjamin Henry Latrobe gave the East Room its function as a site for public audiences and large social events.

Rebuilt after the burning of the White House in 1814, its walls remained bare brick and it was used as storage space. President James Monroe's daughter was married in the East Room, at which time it was temporarily furnished, but it was not until the administration of John Quincy Adams that its walls were plastered and painted. The East Room was finally completed in 1829 under President Andrew Jackson. Major redecorations have occurred, but the room continues to serve its function as a site for large social events.

=== Green, Blue, and Red Rooms ===
James Hoban designated what is today the Green Room as a Common Dining Room, and Thomas Jefferson's family took their meals there. A rectangular ceiling fresco with small circles and trapezoids, designed by Thomas Ustick Walter, was added in 1853. In the 1902 renovation of the White House, a second door, south of the existing door, was cut from the Green Room to the Blue Room. At the same time, a new, southern door was cut from the Green Room to the East Room.

Hoban's original plans for the White House created an oval-shaped Drawing Room (now the Blue Room) in the center of the south part of the executive mansion. Since its inception, the Blue Room has remained the centerpiece of the Executive Residence, serving as the formal reception space for heads of state, ambassadors, and other important people. Since its creation in 1801, it has been redecorated more times (18) than any other room in the White House. Originally, a door in the center of the western wall led to the Yellow Room. A fireplace was set in the eastern wall opposite the door. Originally, niches to either side of the door in the north wall mirrored the three windows in the south wall. The reconstruction of 1817 radically changed the Blue Room. Doors replaced the northern niches, and the western door to the Red Room was sealed. On the Red Room side of the wall, a false door was cut into the wall south of the now-sealed central door, and the false door north of the now-sealed door also concealed. An oval ceiling fresco with curved trapezoids, designed Thomas Ustick Walter, was added in 1853. A jib (or disguised) door was cut through the false door to the Red Room in 1891, and a second jib door cut through to the Green Room south of the fireplace in 1902. The ceiling medallion and cornice moldings were altered by architect Edward Vason Jones during the Nixon administration to more closely resemble early 1800s styles.

To the west of this room was the President's Antechamber (later known as the Red Room). This room originally had two doors, set close together, leading into the Blue Room. (The one on the north was false.) Beginning in 1809, it became the music room for the White House. During the 1817 rebuilding of the White House, the President's Antechamber was turned into a Yellow Parlor. It was sometimes called the Washington Parlor, as the Gilbert Stuart painting of George Washington hung in this room after the Burning of Washington. At this time, the two doors were rebuilt further apart. (Now the south door became a false door.) In 1845, the Yellow Parlor was redecorated in crimson, and took its current name as the Red Room. A rectangular ceiling fresco with a small central circle, curved trapezoids, and half-moons, designed Thomas Ustick Walter, was added in 1853. The false door was cut through in 1891, and has remained open to the present.

=== State Dining Room ===
The northern third of what is now the State Dining Room was originally the western part of the Cross Hall. Two flights of stairs (one against the north wall, one against the south wall) led from the state floor to the second floor. A single, central stair then led up to the third floor. Not completed when the White House was occupied in 1800, the Grand Stairs were probably finished by architect Benjamin Henry Latrobe in 1803 or shortly thereafter. An extensive chimney breast was added to the fireplace in the room's west wall when it was reconstructed in 1817.

A large greenhouse was added to the west side of the White House in 1857, replacing one on the east side which had been torn down that year to make way for expansion of the Treasury Building. The greenhouse burned down in 1867, and in 1869 President Ulysses S. Grant built a larger, higher greenhouse in its place. Later presidents expanded the greenhouse, until it occupied most of what is now the West Wing. Grant built a billiards room atop and to the south of the breezeway leading from the west end of the ground floor of the White House, but this became a Palm Court in 1877 during the Rutherford B. Hayes administration. Hayes authorized new doors cut through the stone of the mansion's walls to provide access between the Palm Court and State Dining Room.

In 1869, President Ulysses S. Grant rebuilt the Grand Stair. Now, only a single staircase against the north wall led to the second floor, while a second stair on the south wall of the second floor led to the third floor. (The new space created on the second floor became the West Sitting Hall.)

To the south of the Grand Stair was a smaller room, to be used as a Cabinet Room or President's Library. The 1817 reconstruction of the White House saw the Cabinet Room/Presidential Library turned into the State Dining Room. The White House was extensively renovated in 1902, during which the Grand Stair was demolished and a new Grand Staircase was built east of the Entrance Hall. The State Dining Room expanded northward into the space formerly occupied by the Grand Stair. The small fireplaces in the east and west walls of the State Dining Room were removed, and the northern door to the Palm Court sealed. (Another door to the Palm Court, beneath the former Grand Stairs, was also sealed.) Where the old Palm Court door existed, a new, massive stone fireplace and oversize mantel (the famous "Buffalo mantel") were added, to match the enlarged room's size and grandeur. The great Venetian window which formerly spanned the width of the Cross Hall in the mansion's west wall was reduced in size to the width of a standard First Floor window. A French door in the lower half of this window now led to the breezeway. The room was paneled in English oak in a Renaissance Revival style, and the furnishings replaced to turn the room into a Beaux-Arts baronial hall (complete with tapestries, cooking racks over the fireplace, and stuffed animal heads).

During the 1948-to-1952 reconstruction of the White House, the State Dining Room was radically redecorated. The "Buffalo mantel" was not reused, and instead given to President Truman (who had it installed in his presidential library). The oak paneling, heavily damaged during its removal, was reinstalled and given a coat of bright celadon green to hide the flaws. (Some of the frieze had to be recarved where it had been sanded down to accommodate the stuffed animal heads.) The painting scheme proved too much. Jacqueline Kennedy had the room painted bone white in 1961, but that proved too bright. The room was painted antique white in 1971 and again in 1981, and then off-white with an umber glaze in 1985.

=== Family Dining Room and Chief Usher's Office ===
As originally constructed, north of the Cross Hall was a Public Dining Room, a Porter's Lodge between the dining room and entrance hall, and a narrow, winding Private Stair. When the White House was rebuilt in 1817, the Public Dining Room became the Private Dining Room. The room was partitioned to make it smaller, and the western third of the room turned into a pantry. President James Monroe gave State Dinners in the Private Dining Room from 1817 to 1825, and subsequent presidents used it as a formal dining room for the first family or as a space for official but small events. By 1849 it was used primarily as a ladies' receiving room, a function it retained as late as 1865.

During the White House's 1902 renovation, the pantry received a mezzanine to increase its utility. To the Family Dining Room were added a vaulted ceiling, faux paneling, and a frieze featuring Neoclassical designs. The frieze was broken by the high windows in the north wall, but the windows were lowered in 1961 and the frieze allowed to continue unbroken around the entire room. The faux paneling was also removed at this time, and the walls painted yellow. The Family Dining Room underwent its first significant renovation since the Kennedy years in 2015. First Lady Michelle Obama had the room painted a light gray, and the decor, furniture, rug, and artwork now reflect a mid-20th century modern look.

The area immediately to the east of the Family Dining Room, tucked against the Entrance Hall, was originally service space. A porter's "lodge" (work and storage space) occupied the northern two-thirds of the space, while a narrow, sharping winding back stairs allowed servants to access the second floor. By 1801, the porter's space had become a generic workroom. It was made into a porter's lodge again in 1825. It retained this use as late as 1865. The renovation of 1902 moved the servants' staircase into the center of this area, creating a corridor on the north and west sides and a small closet to the south. After the 1948-to-1952 gutting and restoration of the White House, the northern space became the chief usher's office. It continued to retain this layout as of 2010.

== Second floor ==
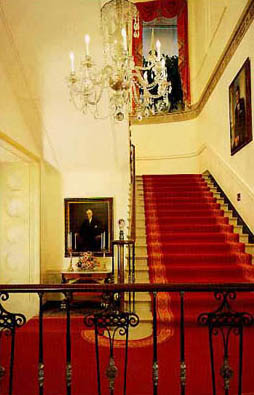
The Grand Staircase, leading up to the second floor

The second floor contains the private living apartments of the first family, as well as a kitchen. Some of these rooms are used for official entertaining, but most are reserved for private use. Rooms found on the second floor include the Center Hall, East Sitting Hall, Lincoln Bedroom, Lincoln Sitting Room, President's Dining Room, Queens' Bedroom, Queens' Sitting Room, Treaty Room, West Sitting Hall, and Yellow Oval Room. The Truman Balcony is accessed from this floor.

The second floor contains only seven historic rooms: the Lincoln Bedroom, the Lincoln Sitting Room, the Queens' Bedroom, the Queens' Sitting Room, the Treaty Room, the East Sitting Hall, and the Yellow Oval Room. The western half of the second floor contains family rooms, a kitchen, and the President's Dining Room, all of which may be redecorated or undergo architectural revision at the whim of the president.

When the White House was occupied in 1801, the eastern half of the second floor remained unfinished. What would later be the Queens' Suite, Lincoln Suite, East Sitting Hall, Grand Stair, and Grand Stair Landing did not exist. Also unfinished was the West Sitting Hall, which was not intended to be a sitting hall at all but rather a "Grand Staircase" leading up from the ground floor. The second floor was completed by 1809. Before the Theodore Roosevelt renovation of 1902, the executive offices of the president were located at the east end of the second floor and the public had full and free access to these areas.

=== Center Hall, East Sitting Hall, and Grand Stair ===
Originally known as the Great Passage, the Center Hall has always been part of the design of the White House. But it has not always had the same structural design. Today, load-bearing walls outside the Treaty Room define the western side of the Stair Landing. But these walls did not exist when the White House was occupied in 1801. Today, the Center Hall, Stair Landing, and East Sitting Room are all on the same level. But in 1801, three small steps just outside the Treaty Room led up from the Great Passage to the East Sitting Room. Additionally, there was no Grand Stair north of the Stair Landing. When the White House opened, a simple, narrow private stair led from the ground floor up to the second floor where the Grand Stair is today.

The Center Hall has always been used as a large drawing room and a waiting area for guests about to be shown into the Yellow Oval Room. Except for the addition of the Stair Landing, little has changed in the Center Hall. Only minor decorative elements have been altered, such as the addition of a cornice molding and bookshelves during the 1952 reconstruction.

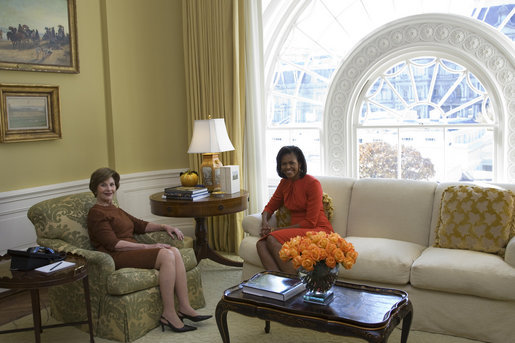
First Lady Laura Bush and Michelle Obama in the West Sitting Hall in 2008

The East Sitting Hall is one of the seven historic spaces on the second floor. In the first half of the 1800s, the White House was treated as a government office building rather than a residence, and members of the public expected nearly complete access to it. Anyone who wanted to see the President would ascend to the second floor using the private steps and wait in the East Sitting Hall. James Hoban, the original architect of the White House, planned and built a double-arched Venetian window here to provide as much light as possible to this area. After 1902, the public no longer had access to the second floor, and the area has been used as a small parlor.

The East Sitting Hall was more distinctively set off from the Center Hall by the 1952 reconstruction. The steps leading from the Center Hall to the East Hall Room were removed, and small storage spaces added on the north and south side of the passage. This roughly halved the width of the hall here, which created a more private East Sitting Room. A very narrow servants stair was added in the north storage area to provide additional access to the third floor.

Access to the Center Hall was originally provided by a Grand Staircase on the west end of the building. On the east end, a narrower set of stairs with a single return gave access. These plain stairs were replaced by the modern Grand Staircase.

=== Lincoln Bedroom and Sitting Room ===
The Lincoln Bedroom and the Lincoln Sitting Room are located in the southeast corner of the second floor. As originally designed and completed in 1809, this space contained two very narrow, north–south running bedchambers with a toilet room between them. By 1825, the toilet had been removed and the space joined to the west bedchamber to form the president's office. This area was used for the president's office over the next several decades. Abraham Lincoln used it as both an office and a Cabinet room, and signed the Emancipation Proclamation in the Lincoln Bedroom in 1863. The Lincoln Sitting Room was used as an office for presidential aides, although President John Tyler used it as part of his office from 1841 to 1845.

The next major reconfiguration of this space occurred during the 1952 reconstruction of the White House, when a full bath and toilet were built in the northeast corner of the Lincoln Sitting Room.

President Truman was the individual who conceived of dedicating the space to Lincoln. The desk in the bedroom was Lincoln's, and the 8-foot (2.4 m) long, 6-foot (1.8 m) wide rosewood bed is probably the one Willie Lincoln died in. The portrait of President Andrew Jackson that hangs in the room is one which Abraham Lincoln admired, and the Lincoln Bedroom has the only known copy of the Gettysburg Address signed, dated, and titled by Lincoln himself. The sitting room furnishings were all purchased by First Lady Mary Todd Lincoln. They include four mahogany chairs, a chest in the late Empire style, and red and gold rugs and drapes. The small mahogany desk in the sitting room was constructed by James Hoban himself. The Lincoln Bedroom and Sitting Room were redecorated by First Lady Laura Bush, who changed the decor so it more accurately reflected tastes common during the American Civil War. The Lincoln Bedroom is usually used to house close friends of the president who are visiting the White House.

=== Queens' Bedroom and Sitting Room ===
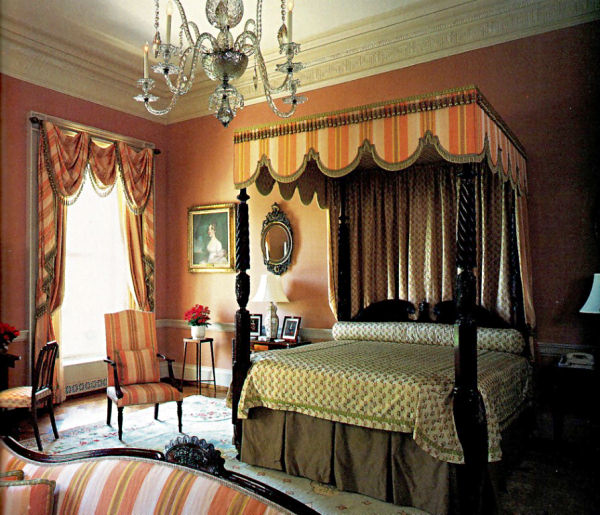
The Queens' Bedroom in 2000

The Queens' Bedroom and Queens' Sitting Room occupy the northeast corner of the second floor. When this space was completed in 1809, it was a mirror of the Lincoln Suite to the south: two very narrow bedrooms with a toilet between them. And like the Lincoln Suite, the toilet was removed by 1825 and the toilet space joined with the western bedchamber. Instead of office space, however, the western two-thirds of this space was partitioned to create storage areas. The remaining bedroom became known as the Rose Bedroom or Pink Bedroom, after the color of its decorating scheme. It was reserved as a guest bedroom, and was most frequently used by the president's private secretaries—all of whom were male, and many of them sons of presidents. By 1865, the western storage space had been converted into a clerk's office. The first woman to regularly occupy the bedroom probably was Anna Roosevelt, who moved into the White House in 1944. The 1952 White House reconstruction created a full bath and toilet in the northeast corner of the sitting room.

The name of the suite of rooms is taken from the number of female royalty who have stayed in the room: Elizabeth, queen consort of King George VI; Queen Elizabeth II of the United Kingdom; Queen Wilhelmina of the Netherlands; and Queen Juliana of the Netherlands. This bedroom is also where Winston Churchill stayed on his regular visits to confer with Franklin Roosevelt, and Harry Truman, during and after World War II.

=== Treaty Room ===
The Treaty Room is located between the Lincoln Suite and the Yellow Oval Room, on the south side of the east wing of the Executive Residence. When completed in 1809, it was intended to be a bedroom. By 1825, its function had changed so that it was now an audience chamber where people could meet with the president (whose office was next door to the east). By 1865, the room had been partitioned. A passage taking up the southern third of the room was created, to permit individuals to pass unobserved from the president's office directly into the White House Library (then occupying the Yellow Oval Room). What remained of the room was used for Cabinet meetings from 1865 to 1902. The space was then used as a sitting room from 1902 to 1961. The 1952 White House reconstruction removed the passage. A new door was opened in the southwest corner of the room to permit direct access to the Yellow Oval Room.

The space became known as the Treaty Room after President John F. Kennedy signed the Partial Nuclear Test Ban Treaty in the room in 1963. It's been used for important treaty signings ever since. President Richard Nixon signed the Anti-Ballistic Missile Treaty in the room in 1972, and President Jimmy Carter signed the Camp David Accords in the room in 1978.

The room has undergone some changes in the past 25 years. First Lady Barbara Bush converted it into a private sitting room for the president. President George W. Bush had the room's historic paneling and its vibrant red, gold, and blue fabrics removed to alter it more to his own personal taste. President Barack Obama had the room redecorated in shades of beige, and continued its use as a private presidential study.

A half-bathroom in the northwest corner of the Treaty Room remains as of 2015 almost untouched since its creation in 1952. It has green and white floor tile in a checkerboard pattern, and the plumbing pipes are exposed.

=== Yellow Oval Room ===
The Yellow Oval Room is the topmost of the Executive Residence's three oval rooms. Not yet furnished when the White House was first occupied, President John Adams used it as a levée room for New Year's Day celebrations on January 1, 1801. The room received its name after First Lady Dolley Madison decorated the room in yellow damask in 1809. The room served as a ladies' drawing room from 1809 to 1829, when it was turned into a ladies' toilet room under Andrew Jackson. It continued to be used as a ladies' toilet until about 1845. First Lady Abigail Fillmore turned it into a library about 1851.

By 1865, the first major architectural change was made to the room when a doorway was cut into the room's southeast corner to provide access to the passage leading behind the Treaty Room to the Presidential Office in the southeast corner of the second floor. The Yellow Oval Room was turned into a family room and private presidential study by Abraham Lincoln, and it remained that way until 1952. President Franklin D. Roosevelt and President Harry S. Truman referred to it informally as the "oval study", and used it as an informal working and meeting space.

The White House reconstruction of 1952 saw additional major architectural changes to the room. The 1865 passage was removed, but the door to the Treaty Room remained. To balance the door aesthetically, a closet was created in the northeast corner of the Yellow Oval Room and an identical door used to close it off. In the west wall of the room, a door was cut to provide access to the presidential bedroom suite.

President Dwight D. Eisenhower began the practice of using the Yellow Oval Room as a formal reception room. More recently, the space has served as a formal drawing room for the first family, and as a reception room where presidents greet dignitaries before lunches and dinners.

=== Presidential Bedroom Suite: The small bedroom/living room ===
The non-historic rooms of the second floor constitute the first family's private residence. As non-historic space, they may be reconfigured and redecorated in any way.

From east to west, leading away from the Yellow Oval Room on the south side, are a small bedroom (with full bath), a large bedroom, and a dressing room (with full bath). The small bedroom west of the Yellow Oval Room was originally used as an "extra bedroom" (Note: The bedroom would be used whenever the President did not want to disturb the First Lady, such as when he had to work late or if she were ill.) beginning with President James Madison and concluding with the administration of President Franklin Pierce. Abraham Lincoln slept in this room, and not the Lincoln Bedroom as is commonly assumed (due to its name). Other occupants of the room included Mary Johnson Stover (daughter of Andrew Jackson) and her three children; May and Jessie McElroy (nieces of President Chester Arthur), Russell Harrison (President Benjamin Harrison's adult son); Mary Harrison McKee (adult daughter of President Benjamin Harrison) and her two children; Quentin and Archie Roosevelt (sons of President Theodore Roosevelt); President Woodrow Wilson and his second wife, Edith Wilson; President Warren G. Harding; President Franklin D. Roosevelt; and President Harry S. Truman.

During the 1952 renovation, a dressing room was built which straddled the wall between this room and the large bedroom to the west. This dressing room could only be accessed from the small bedroom. A full bath was also created in the northeast corner of the room. The space continued to be used as a bedroom by President Dwight D. Eisenhower; President John F. Kennedy; and President Richard Nixon—all of whom slept in the room. The room was turned into a living room and study by President Gerald Ford, and it has remained a study and living room into 2013.

=== Presidential Bedroom Suite: The large bedroom ===
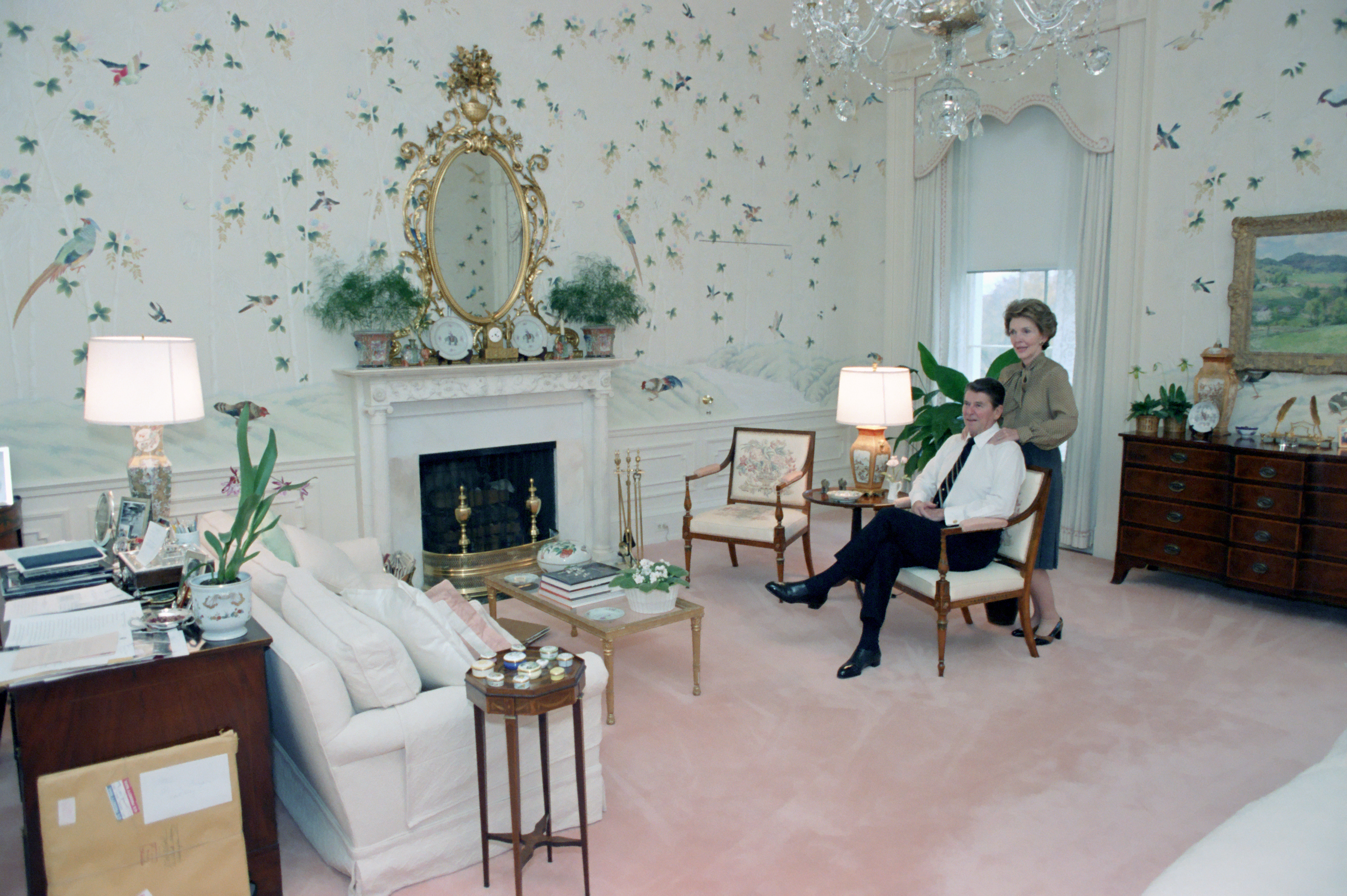
The Presidential Bedroom Suite, after redecoration in 1981

To the west of this space is the large bedroom, which has usually been used by the president and first lady as their private bedroom. Sometimes a president and first lady sleep in the same room, but often they do not due to the president's early and late hours, and personal idiosyncrasies. (Note: President Lyndon Johnson often woke in the middle of the night and would read. He slept in a separate bedroom so as not to disturb First Lady Lady Bird Johnson.)

When this room was completed in 1809, it was intended to be used as the president's bedroom. A tiny entry foyer was partitioned off at the north door, and the western part of the northern third of the room was occupied by a narrow hallway. This hallway connected to the north–south running dressing room on the western wall of the White House. A small toilet occupied the southern end of the dressing room. In this configuration, the large bedroom was occupied by President James Madison and his wife, Dolley; President Thomas Jefferson; President John Adams and his wife, Abigail; and President James Monroe and his wife, Elizabeth. (Note: This is an assumption of historians, as the evidence is unclear as to which room the Monroes used.)

The entry foyer and north passage were removed by 1825. The large bedroom was subsequently occupied by President John Quincy Adams and his wife, Louisa; President Andrew Jackson; (Note: His wife, Rachel Jackson, died before her husband became president.) President Van Buren; (Note: This is an assumption of historians, as the evidence is unclear as to which room Van Buren used. Van Buren's wife, Hannah Van Buren, died before her husband became president.) President John Tyler and his wives Letitia Christian Tyler and Julia Gardiner Tyler; (Note: This is an assumption of historians, as the evidence is unclear as to which room the Tylers used. Letitia Tyler died on September 10, 1842. President Tyler remarried on June 26, 1844.) and President James K. Polk and his wife, Sarah. (Note: This is an assumption of historians, as the evidence is unclear as to which room the Polks used.)

A full bath was added to the dressing room by 1849. The large bedroom was then used by President Zachary Taylor and his wife, Margaret; President Millard Fillmore and his wife, Abigail; (Note: This is an assumption of historians, as the evidence is unclear as to which room the Fillmores used.) President Franklin Pierce and his wife, Jane; President James Buchanan; (Note: President Buchanan never married.) and First Lady Mary Todd Lincoln. The northern passage (this time extending across the length of the room) was restored by 1865. An open doorframe in the south wall provided access to the bedroom to the south. The 1865 configuration was occupied by Senator David T. Patterson and his wife, Martha (daughter of President Andrew Johnson); President Ulysses S. Grant and his wife, Julia; President Rutherford B. Hayes and his wife, Lucy; President James Garfield and his wife, Lucretia; Mary Arthur McElroy, sister of widowed president Chester Arthur; Ruth, Esther, and Marion Cleveland, young daughters of President Grover Cleveland; President Benjamin Harrison and his wife, Caroline; President Theodore Roosevelt and his wife, Edith; President William Howard Taft and his wife, Helen; President Woodrow Wilson and his first wife, Ellen Axson Wilson; (Note: Ellen Wilson died on August 6, 1914.) President Warren G. Harding and his wife, Florence; President Calvin Coolidge and his wife, Grace; and President Herbert Hoover and his wife, Lou. It was used as a sitting room by first ladies Eleanor Roosevelt and Bess Truman.

The room underwent a major architectural change in 1952. The northeast corner of the room was intruded upon by a dressing room which extended from the small bedroom to the east. Another closet extended from the west into the northwest corner of the room. To accommodate these spaces, the northern wall of the large bedroom was made convex. It continued to be used as a sitting room by Bess Truman, but reverted to bedroom space in 1953. It has remained in its 1952 configuration ever since, and has been occupied by First Lady Mamie Eisenhower; First Lady Jacqueline Kennedy; First Lady Lady Bird Johnson; First Lady Pat Nixon; President Gerald R. Ford and his wife, Betty; President Jimmy Carter and his wife, Rosalynn; President Ronald Reagan and his wife, Nancy; President George H. W. Bush and his wife, Barbara; President Bill Clinton and his wife, Hillary; and President Barack Obama and his wife, Michelle.

=== Presidential Bedroom Suite: The dressing room ===
The Presidential Bedroom Suite dressing room was part of the Executive Residence when it was completed in 1809. A full bath was added to it some time before 1849. The bath was expanded to take up half the dressing room's space in the 1952 reconstruction.

The dressing room has not always served as a dressing room, however. It served as a small bedroom for Susanna Adams, daughter of President John Adams; Louisa Smith, niece of First Lady Abigail Adams; Tad Lincoln, son of President Abraham Lincoln; Robert Johnson, son of President Andrew Johnson; Anne Thompson, nursemaid to the young children of President Grover Cleveland; First Lady Eleanor Roosevelt; and First Lady Bess Truman. It was used as a private study by first ladies Lucy Webb Hayes and Lou Henry Hoover, and as a private dining room by President Woodrow Wilson and his second wife, Edith. First Lady Florence Harding used it as a dress storage room. It also served as a combination dressing room/sitting room/office to first ladies Mamie Eisenhower, Jacqueline Kennedy, Lady Bird Johnson, Pat Nixon, Betty Ford, Rosalynn Carter, Nancy Reagan, Barbara Bush, and Hillary Clinton. Michelle Obama used it as a dressing room.

=== West Sitting Hall ===
West Sitting Hall did not exist when the White House was completed in 1809. James Hoban's original design for the White House had a flight of stairs, one against the north wall and one against the south wall, on the ground floor. These rose to a landing, and then a single flight of stairs rose to the second floor. This left only a small area north and south of the staircase, which by 1865 was being called the West Hall. In 1869, President Grant rebuilt the stairs so that the single staircase rose against the south wall. This left what space there was in a single rather than divided area, making it more useful. The new space created on the second floor became the West Sitting Hall. Considered part of the first family's private space, the West Sitting Hall has undergone redecoration with every new presidency and is not considered a historic room.

=== Family Kitchen and President's Dining Room ===
The Family Kitchen and the President's Dining Room are located in the northwest corner of the second floor. The large bedroom which originally existed here was known as the "Prince of Wales Room", after Albert, Prince of Wales stayed in the room in 1860.

When this part of the Executive Residence was completed in 1809, a bedroom suite occupied this space. What is now the private stairs and Cosmetology Room were the eastern chamber and closet of the suite, (Note: The southern third of the space was a closet. The northern two-thirds of this space was the bedchamber.) a bedroom and toilet occupied what is now the President's Dining Room, and a lady's dressing room was in the space currently occupied by the Family Kitchen, the kitchen storage space, and the pantry.

This space was little changed by 1825. Since the private stairs from the ground floor were now complete, the closet in the eastern chamber was removed and a landing for the stairs inserted in the middle of the room. This effectively created an open storage area in the southern third of the chamber. First Lady Louisa Adams and her niece, Mary Hellen, used the bedroom and dressing room as a bedroom suite (but did not occupy the eastern chamber). From March 1829 to the summer of 1830, all three rooms were occupied by Jack and Emily Donelson and their four children. (Note: President Jackson's wife, Rachel Jackson, died before her husband took office. Emily acted as hostess for her father until the summer of 1830, when the Petticoat affair created a rift between them. Emily declined to return to the White House. Sarah Yorke Jackson, the president's daughter-in-law, served as hostess from November 1834 to March 1837. Sources differ on whether Emily Donelson and her family ever returned to the White House.) President William Henry Harrison used the larger bedroom as his personal bedroom during his 32-day presidency in 1841. Robert Tyler (son of President John Tyler), his wife, and daughter used all three rooms from April 1841 to March 1845. From 1845 to 1849, the bedroom, dressing room, and eastern chamber were used by Augusta Tabb Walker and her two small children. (Note: She was the wife of J. Knox Walker. He was President James K. Polk's nephew and private secretary.)

A full bath was added to the eastern chamber by 1865. To accommodate the bathroom, the stairs were moved from the middle to the southern part of the room, and the storage space eliminated. In this configuration, the bedroom was used by Willie Lincoln (who died in it). First Lady Eliza Johnson used the small eastern chamber as her bedroom, while the first family used the larger bedroom as a living room. The large room was later used as a bedroom by Nellie Grant (daughter of President Ulysses S. Grant); (Note: This is an assumption of historians, as the evidence is unclear as to which room Nellie Grant used.) Fanny Hayes (daughter of President Rutherford B. Hayes); (Note: This is an assumption of historians, as the evidence is unclear as to which room Fanny Hayes used.) Mary "Mollie" Garfield (daughter of President James Garfield); (Note: This is an assumption of historians, as the evidence is unclear as to which room Mollie Garfield used.) Ellen "Nell" Arthur (daughter of President Chester Arthur); (Note: This is an assumption of historians, as the evidence is unclear as to which room Nell Arthur used.) President Grover Cleveland and First Lady Frances Cleveland; (Note: President Cleveland, a bachelor, initially occupied the room alone. After his marriage to Frances Folsom on June 2, 1886, the President and First Lady lived together in the room. Cleveland failed to win re-election in 1888. But he won the presidency again in 1892, and once more the Clevelands occupied this space together.) James Robert and Mary Harrison McKee and their two small children; (Note: First Lady Caroline Harrison died on October 25, 1892. Her daughter, Mary, took over hostess duties at the White House for her father, President Benjamin Harrison. The eastern chamber served as the nursery/bedroom for the children.) President William McKinley and his wife, Ida; Alice Roosevelt (daughter of President Theodore Roosevelt) from September 1901 to February 1906; (Note: Alice Roosevelt married Nicholas Longworth on February 17, 1906, at which time she left the Executive Residence.) Ethel Roosevelt (daughter of President Theodore Roosevelt); (Note: Ethel Roosevelt first occupied the room in mid-February 1906, after her sister, Alice, married and left the White House.) First Lady Helen Taft; Eleanor Wilson (daughter of President Woodrow Wilson); (Note: Eleanor Wilson married William Gibbs McAdoo on May 7, 1914, after which time she left the Executive Residence.) Calvin Coolidge, Jr.; (Note: Calvin first occupied the room in August 1923. The 16-year-old boy died of sepsis (blood poisoning) on July 7, 1924.) Lorena Hickok (journalist and aide to First Lady Eleanor Roosevelt); (Note: Historian Carl Anthony Sferazza claims that FDR's aide, Louis Howe, and his wife Grace Howe lived in this bedroom. But historian Jean Edward Smith says the Howes occupied the Lincoln Bedroom.) and Margaret Truman (daughter of President Harry S. Truman).

Major architectural changes to these spaces came in 1952. In the eastern chamber, the bathroom was removed, the stairs were widened, and the stairs moved back into the middle of the space. This created a new (and at last, enclosed) storage space south of the stairs. The passage from the eastern chamber to the bedroom was closed as well. The 1952 reconstruction turned the bedroom into a mirror image of the president's bedroom across the Center Hall. The bedroom's south wall was made convex, which created a walled-off dead space in the room's southeast corner. The southwest corner now became storage space accessible from the dressing room. After the reconstruction, Margaret Truman continued to use it as her bedroom. In 1953, First Lady Mamie Eisenhower turned it from a bedroom into a sitting room for her mother, Elivera "Minnie" Doud.

In 1961, the bedroom suite was torn out. Jacqueline Kennedy thought the Family Dining Room on the state floor was too cavernous and impersonal to raise a family in, and decided that a smaller, more intimate dining room (now the President's Dining Room) should be created on the second floor. A small kitchen took over the space which was once a dressing room, with a pantry and storage space occupying the southern half of the space. (Note: A dumbwaiter connected this kitchen with the main kitchen on the ground floor.) (The storage closet created in the now-convex room to the east was accessed from the new pantry.) The bedroom became the new President's Dining Room.

=== Cosmetology Room ===
What is known today as the Cosmetology Room was originally a series of small rooms used as work and storage space. It was turned into a bathroom by 1865. At some point before 1933, the bath in this space was removed and the area converted into a small office. First ladies Eleanor Roosevelt and Bess Truman used the space as their personal office. President Dwight Eisenhower used it as an art room, where he would paint. The Kennedys used it as a nursery for their two small children, and First Daughter Luci Johnson used it as a study. During the Nixon administration, the room was turned into a beauty salon and named the Cosmetology Room. First Lady Rosalynn Carter planned to renovate the Cosmetology Room, but left the job to First Lady Nancy Reagan. In 1981, the National Hairdressers and Cosmetologists Association paid for an $8,000 ($28,331 in 2025 dollars) refurbishment of the Cosmetology Room. Added to the room were a $400 ($1,417 in 2025 dollars) salmon-colored Louis XV lounge chair, $720 ($2,550 in 2025 dollars) white leather side chair, $230 ($815 in 2025 dollars) manicurist's stool, $346 ($1,225 in 2025 dollars) enamel shampoo bowl, $1,200 ($4,250 in 2025 dollars) pair of hair dryers, $1,800 ($6,374 in 2025 dollars) in wallpaper featuring a pattern consisting of a minute Chinese-style medallion, $3,000 ($7,083 in 2025 dollars) coral-colored handmade wool rug, white Lucite make-up center, green and red drapes, and dotted white batiste curtains from Switzerland. The space remained a beauty parlor into 2013.

=== West Room, North Hall, and East Room ===
The West Room, North Hall, and East Room occupy the center section of the north wall of the Executive Residence. When this area of the mansion was completed in 1809, a single large storeroom occupied this space. The western wall of the East Room was in place by 1825. Two small storerooms had also been created in what would later be the North Hall by constructing short, non-load bearing walls. These walls projected west, dividing the room into thirds. The North Hall as it exists today was created by 1865 when the storage partitions in the West Room were removed.

The West Room served, at various times, as a bedroom for Willie Lincoln, President Andrew Johnson, Andrew Johnson Jr. (President Johnson's son), Robert and Charles Taft (sons of President Taft), (Note: Historian Carl Anthony Sferazza notes that while it is well-established that both Robert and Charles Taft used the West Room, either or both boys may also have used the East Room.) Joseph P. Lash (a close friend of First lady Eleanor Roosevelt), Reathel Odum (private secretary First Lady Bess Truman), John F. Kennedy Jr.; and Chuck and Lynda Bird Johnson Robb and their daughter. The room was converted into a playroom for First Daughter Amy Carter in 1977, and President Ronald Reagan had it set up as a fitness room.

The North Hall was where President Abraham Lincoln stood as he delivered speeches to crowds on the North Lawn. It was used as a schoolroom for Fanny and Scott Hayes, youngest children of President Rutherford B. Hayes. This served as a maid's room during the two terms of President Theodore Roosevelt, as a bedroom for Maude Shaw (nursemaid for Caroline Kennedy and John F. Kennedy, Jr.), and as a clothing storage space for first ladies Lady Bird Johnson and Nancy Reagan.

The East Room's first documented use was as a bedroom for Frederick Dent (the father of First Lady Julia Grant). It later served as a bedroom for President Chester Arthur, Mary Dimmick (First Lady Caroline Harrison's niece and private secretary), John Witherspoon Scott (father of First Lady Caroline Harrison), Kermit Roosevelt, Madge Wallace (mother of First Lady Bess Truman), Caroline Kennedy, Pat and Luci Nugent (she was the daughter of President Lyndon B. Johnson), Tricia Nixon, Susan Ford (daughter of President Gerald Ford), and Amy Carter. It was converted into an office for First Lady Nancy Reagan, but turned back into a bedroom for use by Chelsea Clinton (daughter of President Bill Clinton).

Scott Hayes (young son of President Rutherford B. Hayes), Birchard Hayes (teenage son of President Rutherford B. Hayes), Irvin Garfield (young son of President James Garfield), Abram Garfield (young son of President James Garfield), also used either the West Room or East Room as a bedroom, but records are not clear which.

== Third floor ==
During a 1927 renovation the White House attic was rebuilt into a third floor. It was further expanded with the Truman Reconstruction and currently contains 20 rooms, nine bathrooms, and a main hall. This floor was once used for staff bedrooms, but no staff currently live in the White House. Jacqueline Kennedy extensively decorated these rooms with her favorite White House antiques, with her best known room being the "Empire Guest Room" (finished in First French Empire style). President Jimmy Carter had one room paneled with wood panels taken from an old family barn in Georgia. First Lady Hillary Clinton turned one of the rooms into a soundproof music room where President Bill Clinton could play his saxophone without disturbing others, turned a guest room into an exercise room, and created an "Eleanor Roosevelt Room" for her own use. When Marian Robinson moved to the White House alongside her daughter Michelle Obama's family in 2009, she took a bedroom and sitting area on the third floor as her private quarters. When Donald Trump became president in 2017, his and First Lady Melania Trump's son Barron took a bedroom on the third floor.

Other notable features on the third floor include a sunroom with wet bar (atop the south portico), billiards room, and outdoor rooftop promenade. Visiting dignitaries are normally housed in the second floor state bedrooms and foreign heads of state and government customarily stay at Blair House.

== See also ==
- List of residences of presidents of the United States
- First family of the United States

== Bibliography ==
- Aitken, Jonathan (2013). Margaret Thatcher: Power and Personality. New York: Bloomsbury USA. ISBN 9781620403433.
- Anthony, Carl Sferrazza (2000). America's First Families: An Inside View of 200 Years of Private Life in the White House. New York: Simon and Schuster. ISBN 9780684864426.
- Anthony, Carl Sferrazza (2002). The Kennedy White House: Family Life and Pictures, 1961–1963. New York: Simon and Schuster. ISBN 9780743214735.
- Bauer, Stephen (2004). At Ease in the White House: Social Life As Seen By a Presidential Military Aide. Dallas: Taylor Trade Publishing. ISBN 9781589790797.
- Buckland, Gail; Culbert-Aguilar, Kathleen (1994). The White House in Miniature: Based on the White House Replica by John, Jan, and the Zweifel Family. New York: W.W. Norton & Co. ISBN 9780393036633.
- Bush, Laura (2010). Spoken From the Heart. New York: Simon and Schuster. ISBN 9781439155202.
- Frey, Raymond (2004). "The Truman Renovations of the White House: The House That Harry (Re)Built". In Watson, Robert P. (ed.). Life in the White House: A Social History of the First Family and the President's House. Albany, N.Y.: State University of New York Press. ISBN 9781423739876.
- Genovese, Michael A. (2010). Encyclopedia of the American Presidency. New York: Facts On File. ISBN 9781438126388.
- Harris, Bill (2002). The White House: An Illustrated Tour. Philadelphia: Courage Books. ISBN 9780762414116.
- Kalb, Deborah (2013). "Housing of the Executive Branch". In Nelson, Michael (ed.). Guide to the Presidency and the Executive Branch. Thousand Oaks, Calif.: CQ Press. ISBN 978-1568020181.
- Klara, Robert (2013). The Hidden White House: Harry Truman and the Reconstruction of America's Most Famous Residence. New York: Thomas Dunne Books. ISBN 9781250000279.
- Lanford, Tom (2004). "Edith Roosevelt and the 1902 White House Renovation". In Watson, Robert P. (ed.). Life in the White House: A Social History of the First Family and the President's House. Albany, N.Y.: State University of New York Press. ISBN 9781423739876.
- Library of Congress (1950). District of Columbia: Sesquicentennial of the Establishment of the Permanent Seat of Government. Washington, D.C.: Government Printing Office.
- McAuliffe, Terry; Kettmann, Steve (2008). What a Party!. New York: Griffin. ISBN 9780312377755.
- McCullough, David (2003). Truman. New York: Simon and Schuster. ISBN 9780743260299.
- Monkman, Betty C. (2000). The White House: The Historic Furnishings and First Families. Washington, D.C.: White House Historical Association. ISBN 0789206242.
- Patrick, John J.; Pious, Richard M.; Ritchie, Donald A. (2001). The Oxford Guide to the United States Government. New York: Oxford University Press. ISBN 9780195142730.
- Patterson, Bradley Hawkes (2001). The White House Staff: Inside the West Wing and Beyond. Washington, D.C.: Brookings Institution Press. ISBN 9780815769514.
- Peatross, C. Ford; Scott, Pamela; Tepfer, Diane; Freudenheim, Leslie Mandelson (2005). Capital Drawings: Architectural Designs for Washington, D.C., from the Library of Congress. Baltimore: The Johns Hopkins University Press. ISBN 9780801872327.
- Phillips-Schrock, Patrick (2013). The White House: An Illustrated Architectural History. Jefferson, N.C.: McFarland & Company. ISBN 9780786471522.
- Seale, William (1992). The White House: The History of an American Idea. Washington, D.C.: American Institute of Architects Press. ISBN 9781558350489.
- Seale, William (2001). The White House: The History of an American Idea. Washington, D.C.: White House Historical Association. ISBN 9780912308852.
- Seale, William (2002). "Introduction". In Seale, William (ed.). The White House: Actors and Observers. Boston: Northeastern University Press. ISBN 9781555535476.
- Smith, Jean Edward (2007). FDR. New York: Random House. ISBN 9780812970494.
- Smith, Richard Norton (2002). "The Gold in the Gilded Age". In Seale, William (ed.). The White House: Actors and Observers. Boston: Northeastern University Press. ISBN 9781555535476.
- Sullivan, George (1989). How the White House Really Works. New York: Dutton. ISBN 9780525672661.
- Taylor, Elizabeth Dowling (2012). A Slave in the White House: Paul Jennings and the Madisons. New York: Palgrave Macmillan. ISBN 9780230108936.
- Thacker-Estrada, Elizabeth Lorelei (2004). "Rooms of Their Own: First Ladies and Their Impact On Historic White House Rooms". In Watson, Robert P. (ed.). Life in the White House: A Social History of the First Family and the President's House. Albany, N.Y.: State University of New York Press. ISBN 9781423739876.
- Walsh, Mike (2008). Bowling Across America: 50 States in Rented Shoes. New York: St. Martin's Press. ISBN 9780312366193.
- West, J.B.; Kotz, Mary Lynn (1973). Upstairs at the White House: My Life With the First Ladies. New York: Coward, McCann & Geoghegan. ISBN 069810546X.
- Whitcomb, John; Whitcomb, Claire (2002). Real Life at the White House: Two Hundred Years of Daily Life at America's Most Famous Residence. Florence, Ky.: Psychology Press. ISBN 9780415939515.
- White House Historical Association (1962). The White House: An Historic Guide. White House Historical Association.
- Wolff, Perry; Kennedy, Jacqueline (1962). A Tour of the White House With Mrs. John F. Kennedy. Garden City, N.Y.: Doubleday.
- World Book (2005). Christmas in Washington, D.C.. Chicago: World Book. ISBN 9780716608035.
