= West Sitting Hall =

Room in the White House

Coordinates: 38.897587°N 77.037361°W

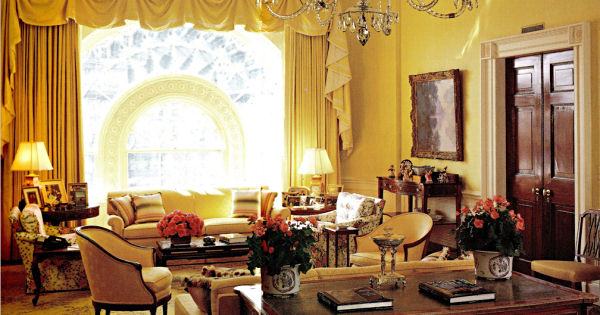
The West Sitting Hall in the administration of Bill Clinton

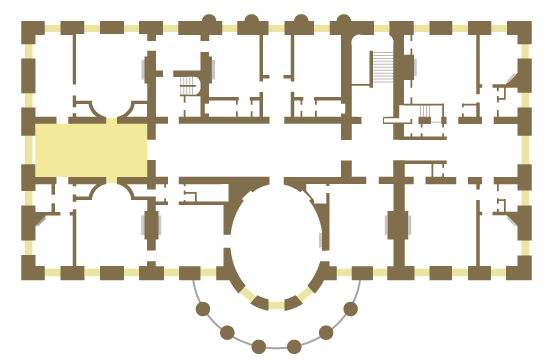
Floor plan of the White House second floor showing location of the West Sitting Hall

The West Sitting Hall is located on the second floor of the White House, home of the president of the United States. The room is entered from the second floor Center Hall on the east side of the room. The room features a large lunette window on the west wall looks out upon the West Colonnade, the West Wing, and the Old Executive Office Building. The room is used by first families as a less formal living room than the Yellow Oval Room.

White House architect James Hoban's initial 1793 plan and 1814 reconstruction design both placed a double Imperial stair form here, with a single stair rising from the ground floor at the terminus of the Cross Hall and dividing to two stairs returning double runs to the east in the present space. Hoban's original plan was not built as designed, as Thomas Jefferson engaged Benjamin Henry Latrobe in 1803 to reverse the orientation of the stair. Latrobe's alteration placed a double run on either side rising from the west to a landing on the east and a single run returning west to the second floor.

Alterations in 1869 simplified the stair moving it along the north side of the space and allowing a sitting area to the south. Presidents and first ladies would descend to the Cross Hall below during state dinners and official entertaining.

The room was mainly just a grand staircase until President Ulysses Grant had it remodeled, allowing for sitting space by the nearby window.

The 1869 staircase was removed during the administration of Theodore Roosevelt as part of a reconfiguration of the White House by architect Charles Follen McKim. McKim's plan removed the west stairway entirely creating room for a much enlarged State Dining Room and moved the ceremonial stair to site of the present Grand Staircase.

Eleanor Roosevelt, who screened the area off from the Central Hall, particularly enjoyed it. In the subsequent Truman reconstruction, architects enclosed the hall with solid partitions and created a living room. At that time, the kitchen elevator was extended to this floor, and the door opened into this room; the Kennedy restoration rerouted it into the little hall when the room to the north was converted into the Family Kitchen. During the Truman reconstruction the east wall was rebuilt to include framed double doors allowing the room more privacy.

== See also ==
- East Sitting Hall
