= Second Floor Center Hall =

Hallway of the White House

Coordinates: 38°53′51.7″N 77°2′11.7″W

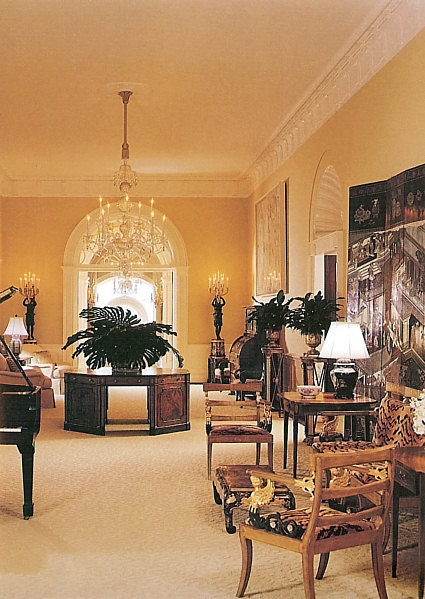
The second floor Center Hall of the White House in 2001.

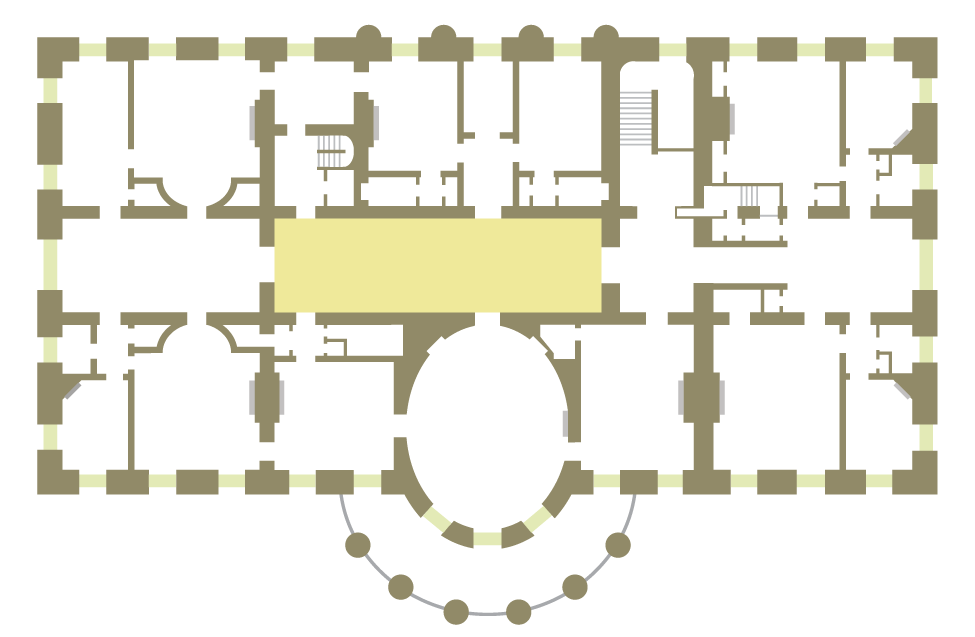
Floor plan of the White House second floor showing location of the Center Hall.

The Center Hall is a broad central hallway on the second floor of the White House, home of the president of the United States. It runs east to west connecting the East Sitting Hall with the West Sitting Hall. It allows access to the elevator vestibule, East and West Bedrooms, the Grand Staircase, Yellow Oval Room, the first family's private living room, and the president's bedroom.

In the early 20th century, William Howard Taft decorated the hall with exotic plants and art he had brought with him from his tenure as Governor-General of the Philippines. Later, Woodrow Wilson watched motion pictures here as the present White House theater was still a cloakroom.

Furnishings include an American manufactured painted wood Neoclassical suite including a settee, six armchairs and four side chairs that once belonged to President James Monroe. The suite was reupholstered in a wool and silk velvet faux tiger print during the administration of George W. Bush and moved to the Center Hall from the Yellow Oval Room. Also in the room is a Louis XVI mahogany cylinder desk acquired for the Red Room during the administration of President John F. Kennedy. A pair of bronze French Empire caryatid torchères from Château de Malmaison were originally acquired for the Blue Room by Kennedy decorator Stéphane Boudin.
