= Cross Hall =

Hallway in the White House

Coordinates: 38.897592°N 77.036433°W

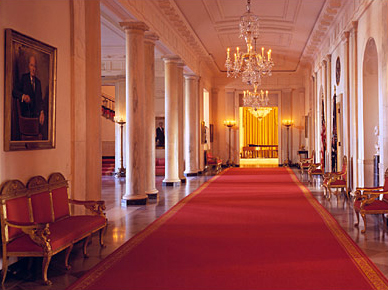
The Cross Hall, looking east

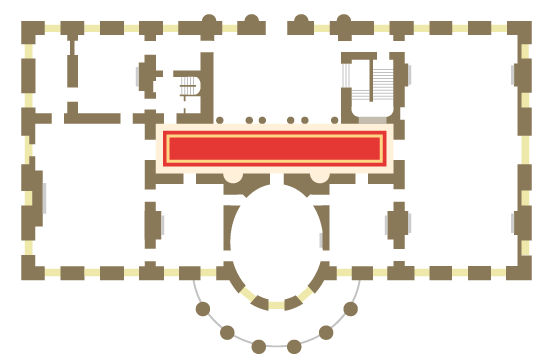
White House State Floor showing location of the Cross Hall.

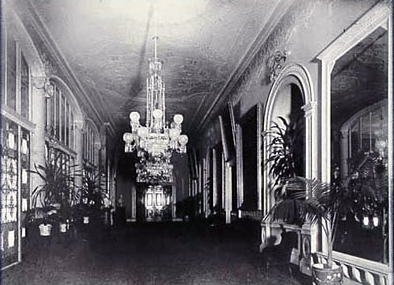
The Cross Hall c. 1898, showing James Hoban's original Ionic columns and Louis Comfort Tiffany's glass screen separating the Cross Hall and Entrance Hall.

The Cross Hall is a broad hallway on the first floor in the White House, the official residence of the president of the United States. It runs east to west connecting the State Dining Room with the East Room. The room is used for receiving lines following a State Arrival Ceremony on the South Lawn, or a procession of the President and a visiting head of state and their spouses.

The space measures just under 18 by 80 feet (5.5 by 24 m). It allows access to the elevator vestibule, Entrance Hall, East Room, Blue Room, Green Room, Red Room, and State Dining Room. The Grand Staircase is visible from an opening directly across from the Green Room.

== Architecture and furnishings ==
The current architectural appearance dates to the 1952 Truman reconstruction, which recreated much of the 1902 renovation by the firm of McKim, Mead and White. The Truman reconstruction replaced the golden-hued Joliet stone floors, columns and pilasters with a cool gray marble. Plaster walls divided by a dado and painted cream and gold were also replaced with marble. McKim employed Roman doric columns based directly on the work of the sixteenth-century Italian architect Giacomo Barozzi da Vignola for the screen separating the cross hall and entrance hall. James Hoban's niches in the south wall were retained although their exterior trim was made less overt.

Although Hoban had urn-shaped cast-iron stoves placed in them, the current niches contain busts of Presidents George Washington and Abraham Lincoln. During the Kennedy Administration restoration, interior decorator Stéphane Boudin arranged the furnishings to more closely resemble the cross hall at Malmaison. While a red carpet has traditionally been in the Cross Hall since the early 1960s, the carpet has, over time, become more detailed and the color has evolved.

The current carpet, manufactured during the Clinton Administration, was designed to be more graphic, and to appear attractively in television broadcasts. The red was made more saturated, the shade slightly warmer, and a gold border of laurel leaves, medallions, and five-pointed stars, based directly on the carved stone border in the Grand Stairway, was woven into the carpet's border. The current appearance of the Cross Hall is the result of a renovation and refurbishing completed in 1997 by the Committee for the Preservation of the White House, the White House Office of the Curator, and funded by the White House Endowment Trust.

A suite of upholstered gilded beech chairs and settées thought to have once belonged to James Monroe are arranged against the walls; two Empire pier tables are placed opposite the Madison suite of furniture and the gilded pier table from Monroe's original purchase for the Blue Room and restored by Jacqueline Kennedy is in the adjacent Entrance Hall.

== History ==
The tradition of hanging presidential portraits in this hall dates to President Ulysses S. Grant. The Buchanan administration first began the tradition of keeping paintings of presidents for the White House collection. The Grants added to this collection, and hung portraits of presidents from Washington to Lincoln in the Cross Hall behind a glass screen.

At that time, visitors could come to the White House on weekdays, enter through the north doors, and walk down the Cross Hall past the paintings to the East Room. With a note from a congressman, visitors could view the other "State Floor" rooms, such as the Red Room, where they could see the large Grant family portrait.

== Gallery ==
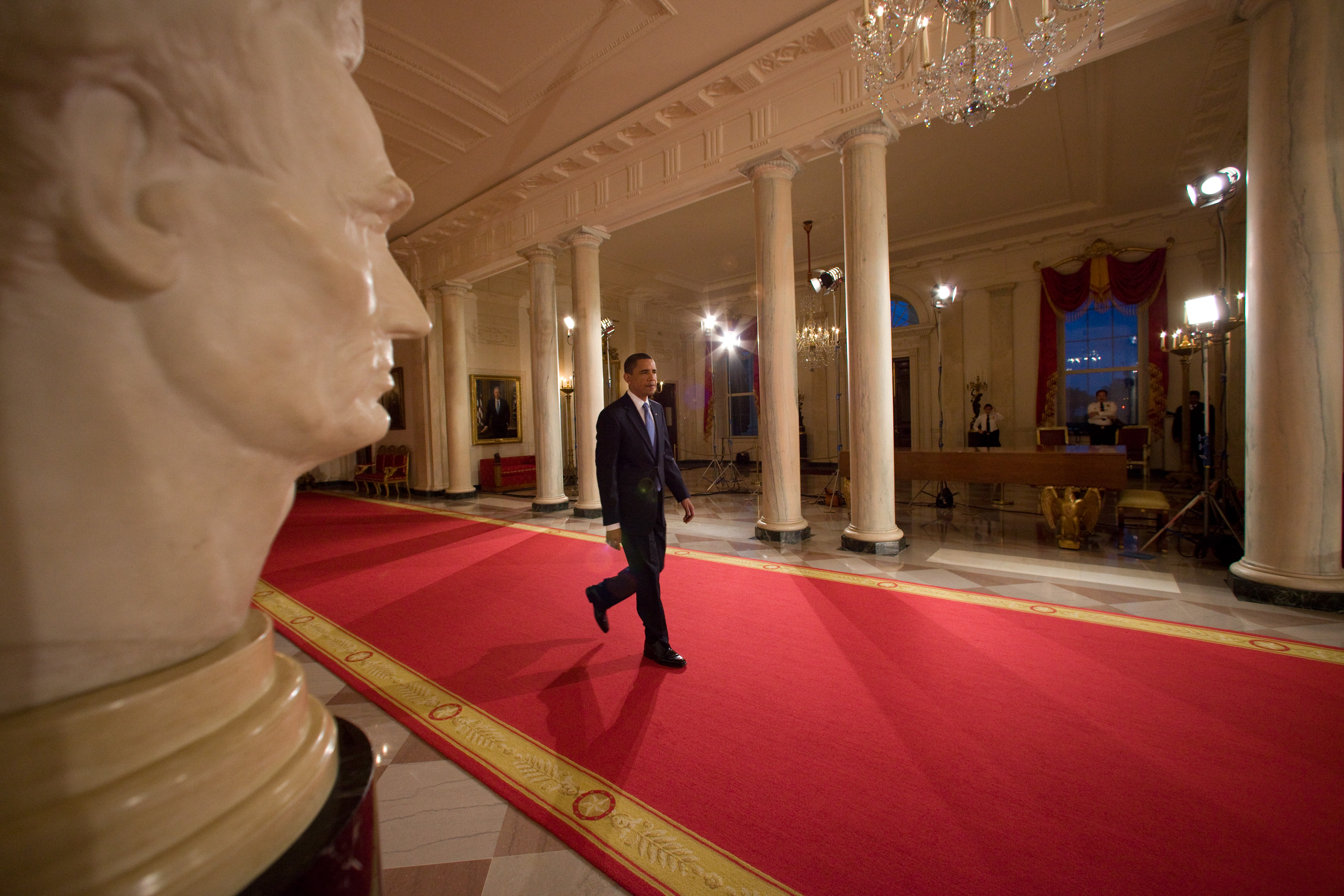
President Barack Obama walks through the Cross Hall to the East Room to present a televised press conference, 2009.

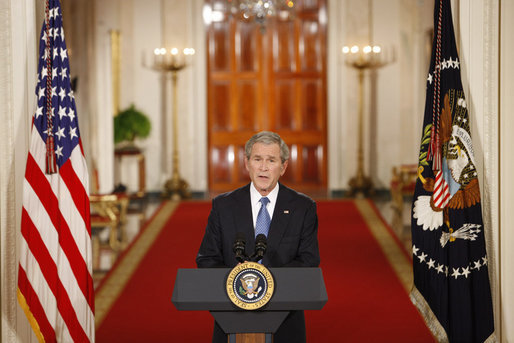
President George W. Bush delivers his farewell address with the Cross Hall behind him, January 2009

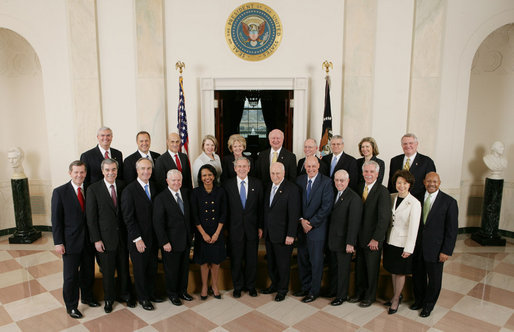
President George W. Bush pictured with his cabinet, 2008

President Ronald Reagan and First Lady Nancy Reagan pose with actor Rock Hudson while guests mingle in the Cross Hall prior to a state dinner, 1984

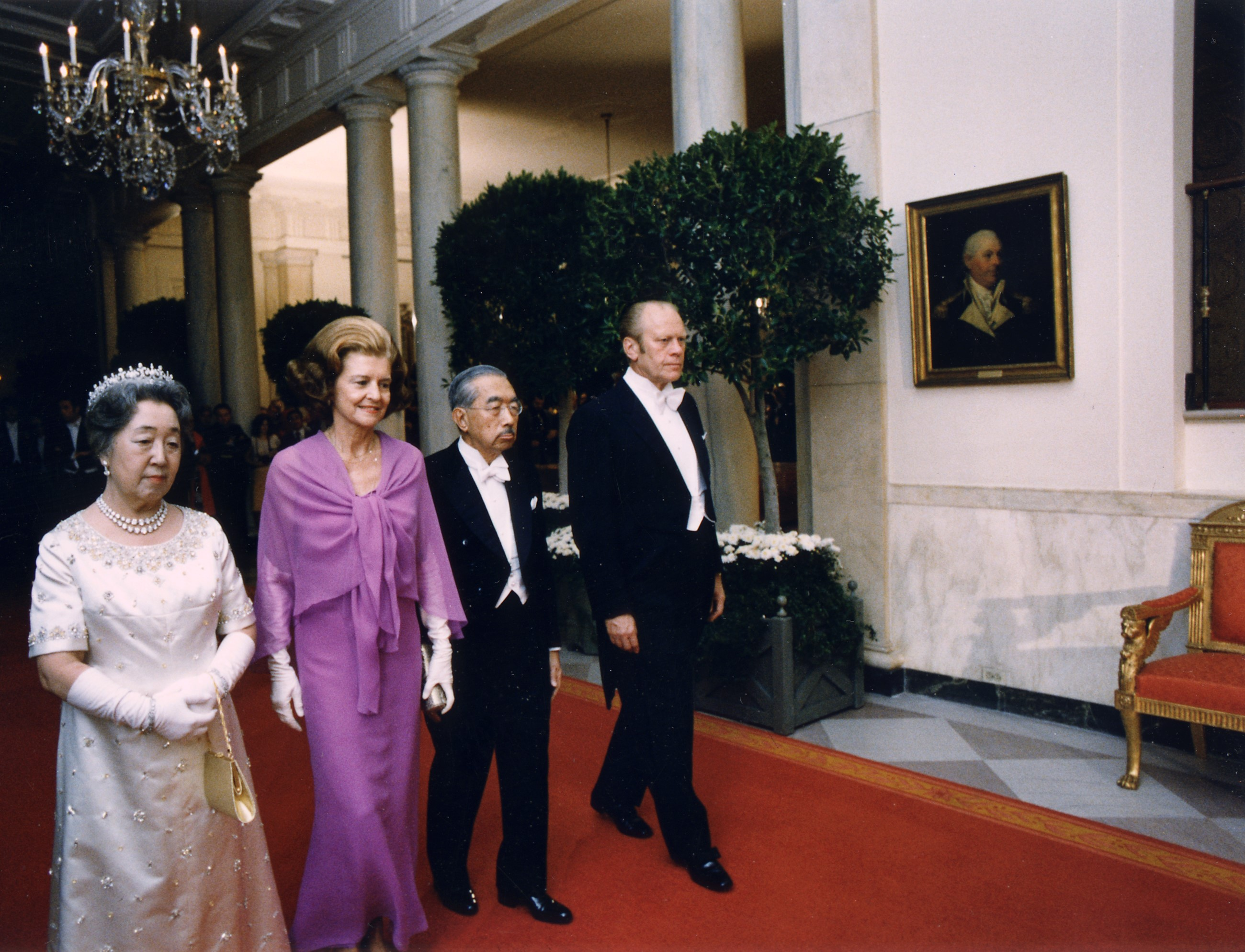
President Gerald Ford, First Lady Betty Ford, Japanese Emperor Hirohito and Empress Nagako walk to the East Room prior to a state dinner, 1975

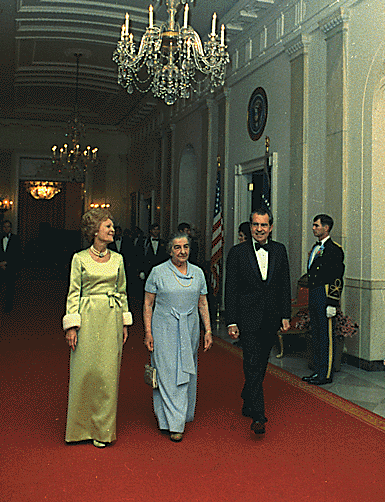
President Richard Nixon, First Lady Pat Nixon and Israeli Prime Minister Golda Meir walk to the State Dining Room prior to a state dinner, 1973

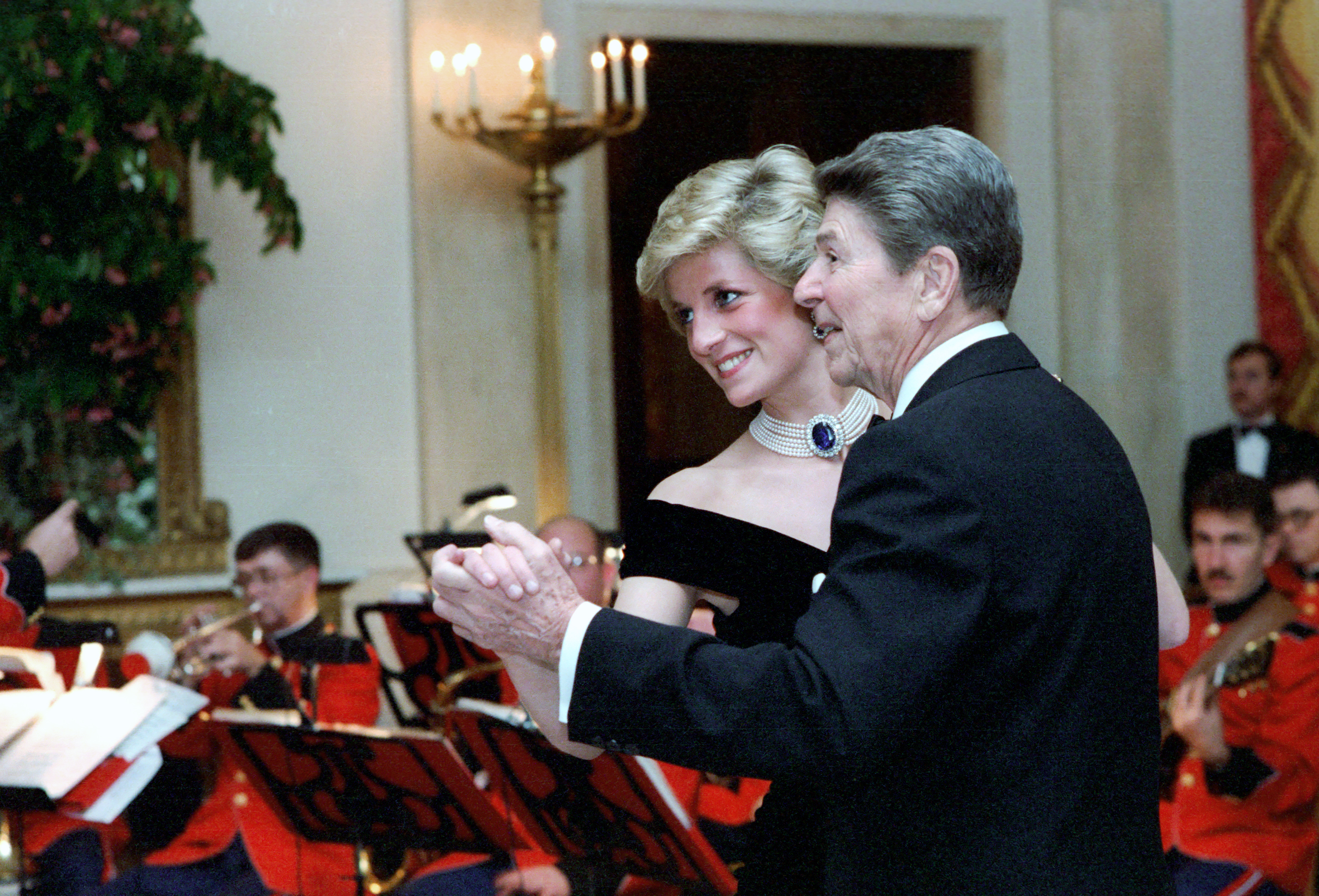
President Ronald Reagan dancing with Diana, Princess of Wales in the Cross Hall, 1985
