= State Dining Room of the White House =

American state room

Coordinates: 38°53′51.35″N 77°2′12.15″W

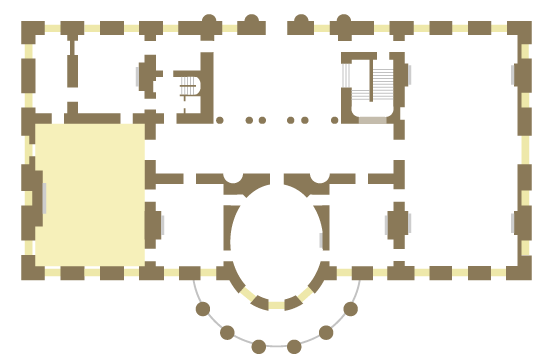
White House State Floor showing the location of the State Dining Room.

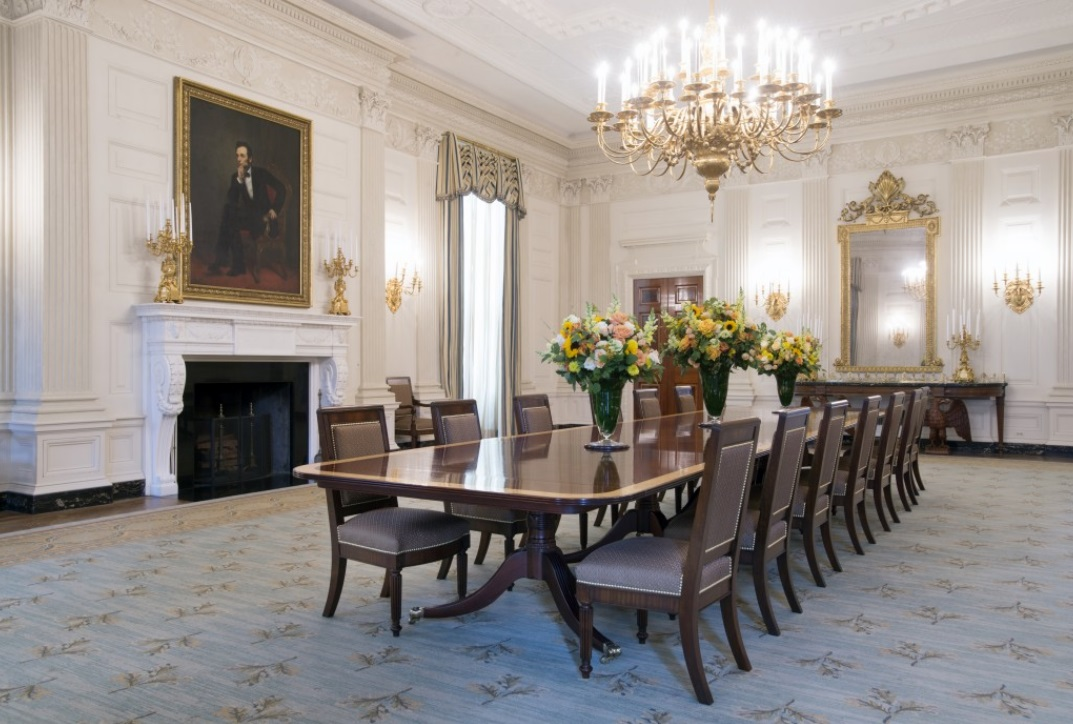
The State Dining Room after renovation in 2015.

The State Dining Room is the larger of two dining rooms on the State Floor of the Executive Residence of the White House, the home of the president of the United States in Washington, D.C. It is used for receptions, luncheons, larger formal dinners, and state dinners for visiting heads of state on state visits. The room seats 140 and measures approximately 48 by 36 feet (15 by 11 m).

Originally office space, the State Dining Room received its name during the presidency of James Monroe, at which time it was first extensively furnished. The room was refurbished during several administrations in the early to mid 1800s, and gasified in 1853. Doors were cut through the west wall in 1877. The State Dining Room underwent a major expansion and renovation in 1902, transforming it from a Victorian dining room into a "baronial" dining hall of the early 19th century—complete with stuffed animal heads on the walls and dark oak panelling. The room stayed in this form until the White House's complete reconstruction in 1952.

The 1952 rebuilding of the White House retained much of the 1902 renovation, although much of the "baronial" furnishings were removed and the walls were painted celadon green. Another major refurbishment from 1961 to 1963 changed the room even further, more closely approximating an Empire style room with elements from a wide range of other periods. Incremental changes to the room were made throughout the 1970s and 1980s, with major refurbishments of the furnishings in 1998 and 2015.

== Early history ==
=== The Adams administration ===
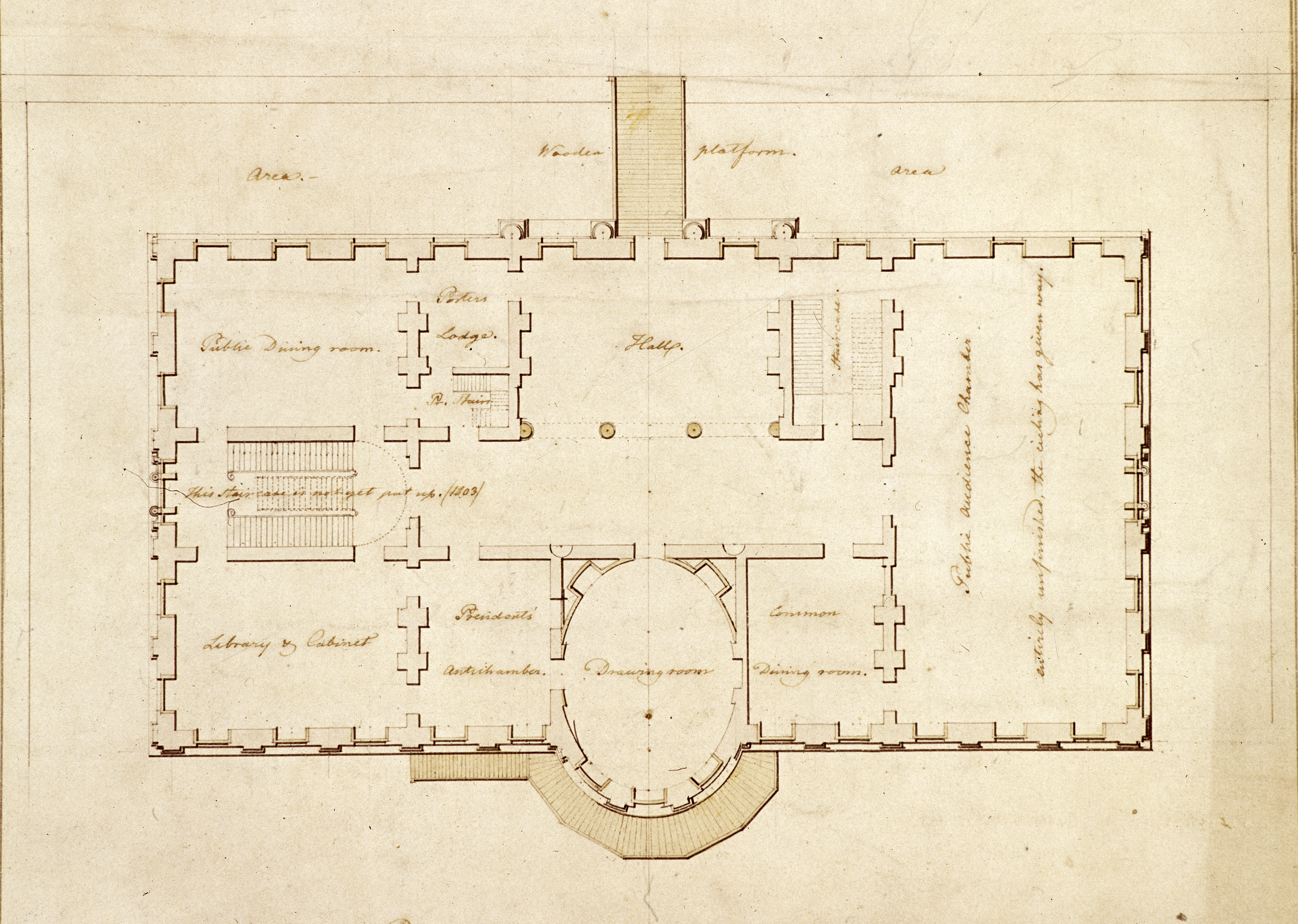
White House State Floor plan, 1803.

The northern third of what is now the State Dining Room was originally the western part of the Cross Hall. Two flights of stairs (one against the north wall, one against the south wall) led from the State Floor to the Second Floor. A single, central stair then led up to the Third Floor (then an attic). Not completed when the White House was occupied in 1800, the Grand Stairs were probably finished by architect Benjamin Henry Latrobe in 1803 or shortly thereafter. To the south of the Grand Stair was a small room, designated by Hoban for use as a Cabinet Room or President's Library.

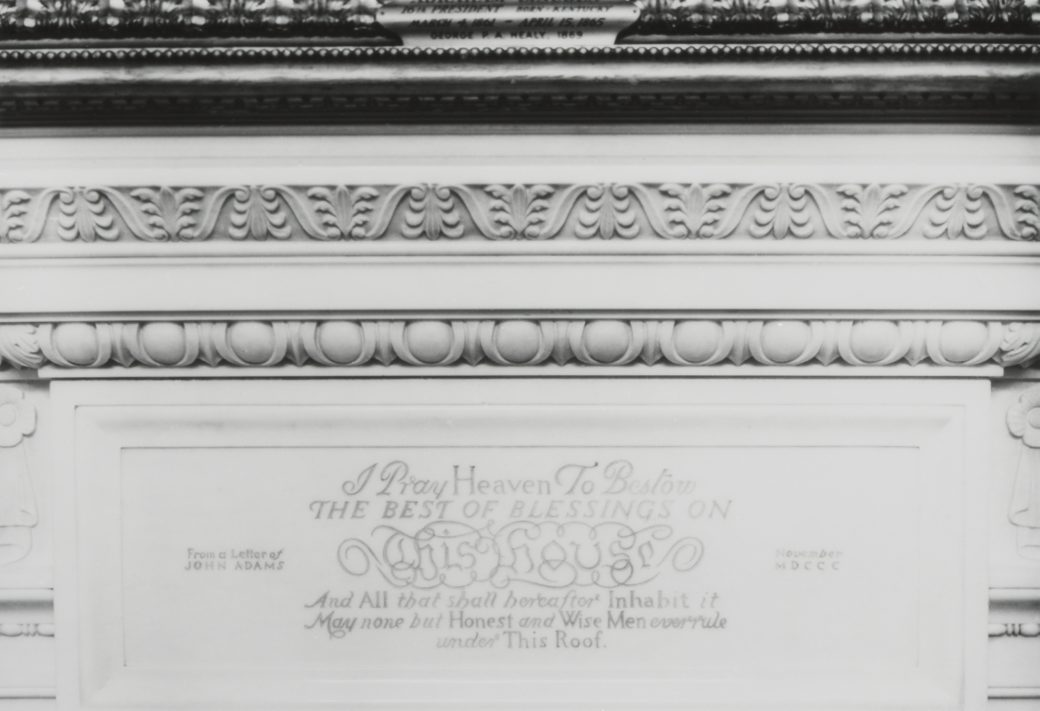
John Adams's blessing was carved into the state dining room mantel in 1945, during the administration of Franklin D. Roosevelt.

President John Adams was the first president to occupy the White House. The White House was far too large for their needs, and they had few furnishings with which to make it a home. The State Dining Room was temporarily partitioned in order to make it usable. The southwest corner became a "levee room", where the public could meet and mingle with the president, while the northwest corner became a dining room.

=== The Jefferson office ===
President Thomas Jefferson used the southwest corner of the State Dining Room as his primary office from 1801 to 1809. The room was sparsely furnished at this time, with only a desk and chairs. He also kept his gardening tools and an assortment of potted plants in the room. The floor was covered with canvas, painted green. In time, charts, maps, and globes; six small mahogany sets of shelves; three long mahogany tables with green cloth tops; two mahogany stools; two mahogany armchairs; a tall bookcase; a small set of mahogany steps (for reaching the top of the bookcase); and a desk, letterpress printer, and sofa. For seating, Jefferson moved 12 of the black-and-gold painted mahogany chairs (purchased during the Adams administration) from the dining room to the office.

=== Transformation into the State Dining Room ===
Jefferson's successor, James Madison, wanted the room to be a dining room. First Lady Dolley Madison worked with Jefferson's architect, Benjamin Henry Latrobe, to make some structural changes to the State Dining Room, which primarily meant closing off two windows in the west wall.

A large dining table, capable of seating at least 40, was placed in the room, surrounded by simple rush-bottomed chairs. A silver service and a blue-and-gold china service purchased from the Lowestoft Porcelain Factory in England were used for dining, and a simple surtout de table (or "plateau") (Note: A surtout de table was a richly detailed centerpiece used to hold fruit, desserts, savories, or liqueurs. They were usually made of gold-gilt bronze or brass, but silver or porcelain ones were also common. The centerpiece usually stood on small legs, and its floor was often mirrored. It had a finely wrought rim, usually depicting fruit, leaves, vines, animals, bacchantes, or putti. The plateau often came in sections, so it could be expanded or reduced as needed. The centerpice also usually had slots in the rim or floor where removable statuettes, candelabra, or pedestals on which small serving plates could be inserted.) was used as the centerpiece. Other than the dining table, the largest piece of furniture in the room was a massive sideboard. The windows were uncurtained, and walls papered. Paintings of George Washington, John Adams, and Thomas Jefferson were hung on the walls. The Washington image was a copy of the Lansdowne Portrait, a full-length, life-size figure of the first President painted by Gilbert Stuart in 1796. The canvas flooring was removed, and an ingrain carpet (an inexpensive, flatwoven textile) installed. Otherwise, the room remained only sparsely furnished.

=== Reconstruction of the State Dining Room ===
The White House was burned on August 24, 1814, by the British Army during the War of 1812. The Landsdowne copy was saved from destruction by doorman Jean Pierre Sioussat and White house gardener Tom Magraw, who cut it from its elaborate frame and spirited it away from the White House just minutes before British troops arrived.

The White House was reconstructed in 1817, after which the Cabinet Room/Presidential Library was called the State Dining Room. The reconstruction added an extensive chimney breast to the fireplace in the room's west wall.

The State Dining Room was extensively furnished at this time. President James Monroe, rather than First Lady Elizabeth Monroe (who was in fragile physical health), was primarily responsible for making decorative decisions for the White House. Monroe decided to have the walls of the State Dining Room covered in green silk. Two Italian Carrara marble mantels, featuring Neoclassical caryatids on either side, were also bought by Monroe and installed over the two fireplaces in this room.

One of Monroe's most important purchases were several ornamental ormolu (or bronze doré) pieces to furnish the State Dining Room. The surtout de table, crafted by Denière et Matelin in France, was 14 feet (4.3 m) long when fully extended. The piece had seven sections, each 24 inches (61 cm) long, which could be removed or inserted as needed to adjust the length. It had a mirrored floor, and garlands of fruit and flowers formed the rim. Seventeen bacchantes (personifications of the female servants of Bacchus, the ancient Roman god of wine) standing on orbs, their outstretched arms holding candleholders, could be inserted into small rectangular pedestals at equidistant points around the centerpiece. Although surtout de table were common in elegant English and French dining rooms, few Americans had seen them and the piece deeply impressed those who saw it. Other ormolu items included three pedestals for crystal vases (one large, two small), consisting of the Three Graces holding up a basket; three porcelain vases in the Etruscan style and ornamented with festoons of flowers; and a pair of pedestal stands, or trepieds, consisting of sphinxes sitting on slender legs, their upraised wings supporting a shallow bowl.

Monroe also ordered the White House's first tableware and dinnerware. These included 72 silver place-settings, which included an unknown number of serving dishes, platters, tureens, chafing dishes, and other items. These were manufactured by Jacques Henri Fauconnier of Paris. (Note: Only two soup tureens have survived into the late 20th century.) Thirty-six vermeil (gold-gilt silver) flatware settings, manufactured by J. B. Boitin of Paris, were also purchased. (Note: Only a few pearl-handled fruit knives survived into the 20th century.) A 30-setting gilt porcelain china service was also purchased, although its design and manufacturer are not known as no pieces have survived. A few items of the accompanying 166-piece, 30-setting dessert service, manufactured by Dagoty et Honoré in Paris, have survived. The dessert plates for this amaranth-on-white china service feature a Napoleonic eagle in the center. Five vignettes, representing agriculture, strength, commerce, science, and arts, are set into the broad, red rim.

=== Changes in the early to mid 1800s ===
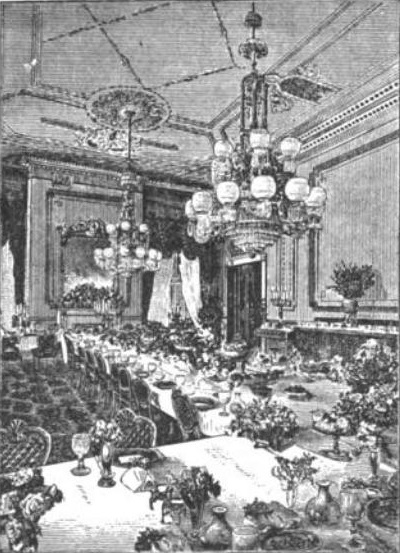
State Dining Room during the Pierce administration (1853 to 1857). Note the use of the Polk chairs.

President Andrew Jackson had the dining room wallpapered some time after 1829. The paper was purchased from French-born Louis Véron, a Philadelphia fine furnishings purveyor. This material, which was blue, green, yellow, and white and with a scattering of gold stars and gilt borders, was used in most of the rooms on the State Floor. Some time during 1833 and 1834, Veron supplied mirrors as well, and carpeting from Belgium and new mahogany dining room chairs from Alexandria, Virginia, cabinetmaker James Green also helped refurbish the room. An 1829, 18-light chandelier (fueled by whale oil and of unknown make) was moved from the East Room into the State Dining Room in 1834 to provide light.

Heavy crowds in the White House during the Jackson administration left the mansion in shabby condition. President Martin Van Buren purchased a new, 30-foot (9.1 m) table for the State Dining Room, and reupholstered the chairs in blue satin fabric. Blue and yellow drapes and rugs complimented the chairs. At some point, the mantels over the fireplace had been replaced with new ones of black marble, and three chandeliers now lit the room.

Although little upkeep was made to the White House during the administrations of William Henry Harrison and John Tyler due to a national depression, President James K. Polk redecorated the State Dining Room in the summer of 1845. New purple and gold drapes were hung in the room, and 42 rosewood balloon-back (Note: The balloon-backed chair is so named because its back resembles the shape of a hot air balloon: Curved around a center point, moving vertical and then back and outward.) side chairs with cabriole legs and a heart-shaped crest were purchased. They were upholstered in purple velvet and manufactured by New York City furniture maker Charles Baudouine. The carpet was likely replaced with one of Turkish make.

President Franklin Pierce completely refurbished the room in 1853. The chandeliers were converted to natural gas, the wood moldings and dado rails replaced, the room replastered and repainted, and new carpets and drapes provided. L. R. Menger & Co. of New York provided gilt plaster cornices for the windows, and new gilt frames for the mirrors in the room. It is likely that Anthony and Henry Jenkins, furniture makers from Baltimore, crafted four walnut side tables for Pierce, and that these were later used in the State Dining Room.

A large greenhouse was added to the west side of the White House by President Pierce in 1857, replacing one on the east side which had been torn down that year to make way for expansion of the Treasury Building.

Although First Lady Mary Todd Lincoln refurbished most of the rooms in the White House in 1861, there is scant evidence to indicate she did much to the State Dining Room. However, the room was used by Francis Bicknell Carpenter as an artist's workshop as he painted First Reading of the Emancipation Proclamation of President Lincoln from February to July 1864. In 1867, four walnut console tables were placed against the walls of the dining room.

=== Changes in the mid to late 1800s ===
The western greenhouse burned down in 1867, and in 1869 President Ulysses S. Grant built a larger, taller greenhouse in its place. Grant also rebuilt the Grand Stair at this time, so that only a single staircase against the north wall led to the Second Floor. (A second stair on the south wall of the Second Floor led to the Third Floor.) Later presidents expanded the greenhouse further, and after it was turned into a palm court in 1877 by President Rutherford B. Hayes new doors were cut through the stone of the mansion's walls to provide access between the Palm Court and State Dining Room.

Minor furnishing changes were also made in the last quarter of the 1800s. In 1880, First Lady Lucy Webb Hayes installed a new carpet and lace curtains in the State Dining Room. She also purchased two Victorian candelabra for $125 each ($4,170 in 2025 dollars) from Tiffany & Co. The three-tiered items, featuring floral garlands and the heads of satyrs and reclining children at the base, were probably made in Europe (their manufacturer is not known) and have remained in the room ever since.

In 1882, President Chester A. Arthur contracted with Tiffany & Co. to redecorate the State Dining Room. Most of the work involved painting and regilding, and it was at this time that the Monroe surtout du table was regilded. A major redecoration of the State Dining Room occurred again about 1884, which received new carpets, curtains, draperies, and wall and ceiling paint. Paint scheme was a yellow-brown, and featured a 5-foot (1.5 m) high stencil frieze in various shades of yellow and gold.

The room was electrified in 1891, which included the installation of bronze wall sconces. By 1901, 40 dining room chairs were moved from the Family Dining Room to the State Dining Room. (Note: Eighteen of these leather-upholstered dining room chairs were ordered in 1882 from Hertz Brothers of New York, and another 12 more in 1883. A few years later, 22 copies of these chairs were manufactured by Daniel G. Hatch & Company of Washington, D.C.)

== 1902 Roosevelt renovation ==
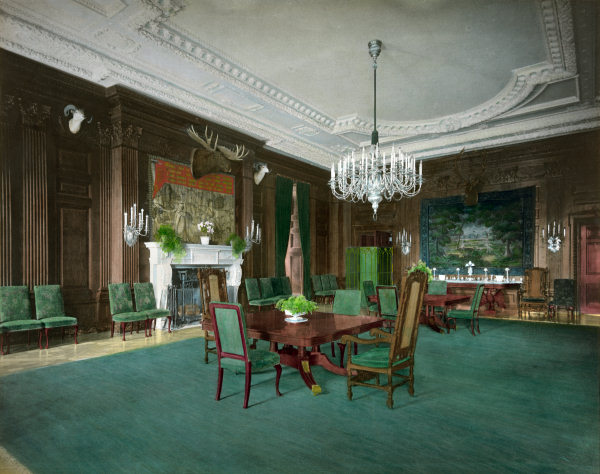
State Dining Room after the 1902 renovation.

The White House was extensively renovated in 1902 after the West Wing was completed, which allowed a number of government offices to vacate the Executive Residence. President Theodore Roosevelt selected the New York City architectural firm of McKim, Mead & White to oversee the renovations and redecoration. The Grand Stair was demolished and a new Grand Staircase built east of the Entrance Hall. The State Dining Room expanded northward into the space formerly occupied by the Grand Stair. The small fireplaces in the east and west walls of the State Dining Room were removed, and the northern door leading west to the Palm Court sealed. (Another door to the Palm Court, beneath the former Grand Stairs, was also sealed.) Where the old Palm Court door existed, a new, massive stone fireplace and oversize mantel (the famous "Buffalo mantel") were added, (Note: This mantel, of unpolished gray stone from Worcester, England, was originally carved with lion's heads. Roosevelt wanted animals more representative of the United States, and ordered them recarved into bison heads.) to match the enlarged room's size and grandeur. McKim, Mead & White implemented a decorative style for the room similar to that of an English manor house. This mixed style has been described as early Elizabethan with elements of Italian Renaissance, Beaux-Arts, early 19th century Georgian, late Victorian, and "baronial". Herter Brothers of New York City designed and installed new plasterwork ceiling and cornice. The ceiling was white, while the cornice was painted a delicate gray. (Note: McKim ordered the ceiling painted seven times in order to achieve the correct shade of gray.) Below the cornice was a delicately carved frieze featuring (at Roosevelt's insistence) taxidermied animal heads. Dark English oak panelling carved in a Renaissance Revival style, with Corinthian pilasters, was also crafted and installed by Herter Brothers. A baseboard of white marble ran around the room, and a new oak floor was installed.

The furnishing of the White House (including the State Dining Room) was overseen by First Lady Edith Roosevelt, and carried out by Charles Follen McKim. The creation of "baronial" hall look included the hanging of tapestries and 11 stuffed animal heads (Note: These included American bison, elk, moose, and white-tailed deer, among others.) on the wall and cooking racks over the fireplace. The Monroe mantels were moved to the Green Room and Red Room to make way for the "Buffalo mantel".

To furnish the room, Stanford White designed William and Mary oak armchairs with caned backs and Queen Anne style mahogany side chairs. The chairs were then manufactured by the A. H. Davenport and Company of Boston. Based on furniture in his own home, he also designed two small and one large mahogany side tables with marble tops and carved wooden eagle pedestals. (Note: The exact style of these side tables is not clear. White House Curator Betty C. Monkman said they were Italian in design, but the Brooklyn Museum says they are in the style of English architect William Kent.) All these pieces of furniture were manufactured by A. H. Davenport and Company of Boston. Large, heavy Chiavari chairs were also used in the room.

A silver-plated chandelier and eight, silver-plated, six-branch wall sconces were designed by McKim and manufactured and installed by Edward F. Caldwell & Co. The chandelier was of a unique design, as it contained no glass or crystal. Instead, it consisted of individual candelabra, each supported by curved piping (a gooseneck). Each gooseneck was attached to the central body, and the entire chandelier hung from the ceiling by a chain. The chandelier proved 6 inches (15 cm) too wide, and had to be taken down and altered. What other furnishings were needed were drawn from the pre-1902 items in the room.

Limited changes were made to the State Dining Room after the Roosevelt renovation. First Lady Ellen Axson Wilson had the taxidermied heads removed in March 1913, shortly after occupying the White House. Ellen Wilson died in August 1914. President Woodrow Wilson then married Edith Bolling Galt in December 1915. Mrs. Wilson disliked the two square tables in the State Dining Room, and had them removed in favor of a round table (capable of seating 14 to 16 people) which she found in the White House kitchen. Mrs. Wilson also had the drapes replaced and chairs reupholstered.

== 1952 Truman reconstruction ==
The room remained largely unchanged until 1952. One of the few changes made was the addition of a painting, Abraham Lincoln by George P.A. Healy, hung over the fireplace by President Franklin D. Roosevelt in 1937. The 1869 oil-on-canvas painting by George Peter Alexander Healy depicts a seated, thoughtful Abraham Lincoln, and has remained over the State Dining Room fireplace ever since. (Note: The "Healy Lincoln" and the "Healy Quincy Adams" were moved to the East Room in June 1973. It was replaced by a newly-acquired 1895 work, Under the Palisades in October, by Jasper Francis Cropsey. The "Healy Lincoln" was returned to the State Dining Room in August 1974.) Roosevelt also added an inscription to the "Buffalo mantel". The inscription was taken from a letter by John Adams to his wife Abigail written the second night he lived in the White House: "I pray Heaven to bestow the best of blessings on this House, and all that shall hereafter inhabit it. May none but honest and wise men ever rule under this roof."

Systematic failure of the internal wood beam structure required reconstruction during the administration of Harry S. Truman. The building was dismantled and an internal steel superstructure was constructed within the sandstone walls. While providing critically needed repairs, much of the original interior materials were damaged or not reinstalled. The State Dining Room, more than any room, had the majority of its wall and ceiling materials reinstalled.

During the 1948-to-1952 reconstruction of the White House, the State Dining Room was completely redecorated. The "Buffalo mantel" was replaced with a simple neo-Georgian style mantel of dark green marble. The upscale New York City department store, B. Altman and Company, was selected as the chief interior design consultant and supplier for decor and furnishings. Charles T. Haight, director of Altman's design department, chose new fabrics for the carpet and chairs in the room. The "Buffalo mantel" was given to President Truman (who had it installed it in his presidential library). The oak panelling, heavily damaged during its removal, was reinstalled and given a coat of bright celadon green to hide the flaws. (Some of the frieze had to be recarved where it had been sanded down to accommodate the stuffed animal heads.) King George VI of the United Kingdom donated a late 17th-century carved and gilded overmantel mirror and painting frame, and a pair of 1770 bronze and blue candelabra designed and manufactured by the renowned metalsmith, Matthew Boulton. Edith Wilson's round dining table was removed, and replaced with a mahogany dining table in the style of George Hepplewhite.

== Kennedy renovation ==
First Lady Jacqueline Kennedy worked with American antiques expert Henry Francis du Pont and French interior designer Stéphane Boudin on the restoration of the State Dining Room. Du Pont and Boudin both recommended that changes should emphasize the earlier work of McKim. Most of Boudin's suggestions for the room mirrored changes he had made to the dining room at Leeds Castle in Kent, England.

On Boudin's recommendation, the panelling was repainted bone white (Note: Jacqueline Kennedy's good friend, the interior decorator Sister Parish, convinced painter and craftsman Peter H. Guertler, widely known as an expert on restoration of historic interior paintwork, to repaint the room for free.) and the silver plated chandelier and wall sconces were regilded to match the Monroe-era surtout du table. The pilaster-mounted sconces were reinstalled on the side panels at the suggestion of Henry Francis du Pont, who chaired the Fine Arts Committee for the White House. Boudin and du Pont were in agreement that the 1952 mantel should be replaced. Boudin designed a replacement mantel, but du Pont wanted the original 1902 "Buffalo mantel" and asked the Truman presidential library to return it. The library declined, so a reproduction "Buffalo mantel" was made and installed. This mantel was of white marble (rather than unpolished grey stone) to match the room's new color scheme. (Note: The reproduction mantel was smaller than the 1902 original. It was a gift of the Marble Industry of New York and the architectural firm Steinmann, Cain, and White (successor to McKim, Mead & White).)

At Boudin's suggestion, McKim's mahogany side and console tables were painted to mimick white marble with gold veining, and the eagle supports and bowknots were gilded. (Note: Guertler also oversaw the painting and gilding of these items, work and materials which he also donated.) The new color scheme for those pieces were intended to make them blend into the panelling. A new carpet, a copy of one Boudin designed for Leeds Castle, was woven by Stark Carpet Co. of New York City and installed. The "Healy Lincoln" portrait was restored, reversing conspicuous damage. The Chippendale reproduction side chairs were removed and replaced by the Chiavari chairs by McKim, Mead & White.

The gold damask draperies installed during the Truman administration were retained until 1967, when new, straight-falling drapes and scalloped window valances were installed. These window treatments had been designed by Boudin in 1963, based on work at Leeds Castle. The fabrics were supplied by Maison Jansen, Boudin's firm.

A Chinese coromandel screen was set up in the State Dining Room in 1961. This screen was on loan from Anne McQuarrie Hatch, wife of Lorenzo Boyd Hatch (co-founder of Atlas Corporation). It was later donated to the White House, and eventually moved to the Second Floor. The Monroe administration surtout de table, long absent from the room, was retrieved from storage and placed on the table. New vermeil baskets were purchased and used for floral arrangements on the other rounds, while plain tulip-shaped crystal glasses were purchased from the Morgantown Glassware Guild of West Virginia to augment the existing china service. (Note: The Morgantown Glass Guild eventually went out of business. Replacement glassware was ordered in 1974 from the Fostoria Glass Company of West Virginia, and in 1994 from Lenox Crystal of Pennsylvania.)

The way the State Dining Room was set for events was also fundamentally changed by the Kennedys. All previous administrations had set the tables in an E-shaped or horseshoe arrangement. The Kennedys changed this to rounds, (Note: The rounds were manufactured by White House carpenters.) which made for more socializing and relaxed protocol. On occasion, tables were also set up in the adjacent Blue Room as well. (Note: The State Dining Room can seat 120 people at rounds, while the Blue Room can seat about 30 at rounds.)

=== Johnson, Nixon, Reagan, and George H.W. Bush refurbishments ===
In 1967, Lady Bird Johnson oversaw the installation of new draperies, based on a design created by Stephane Boudin shortly before President Kennedy's assassination, as well as reupholstery of the 1902 chairs. First Lady Pat Nixon worked with White House curator Clement Conger to refresh the room in 1971. She had the room painted antique white in 1971 after the Kennedy-era paint proved too bright, and she replaced the Kennedy-era carpet with one of Indian manufacture.

In 1973, a man and woman broke away from the public tour of the White House and splashed six vials of blood on the walls and some of the furniture in the State Dining Room. The couple said they were protesting the status of oppressed people everywhere.

First Lady Nancy Reagan hung new gold silk draperies designed by interior designer Ted Graber. She initially had the room repainted antique white in 1981, but in 1985, the room was painted off-white with an umber glaze.

During the presidency of George W. Bush, the badly worn 1952 floor of the State Dining Room was removed. New flooring made of white oak, manufactured by Kentucky WoodFloors, was installed by Mountain State Floors (a West Virginia company) in a herringbone pattern.

== Clinton renovation ==
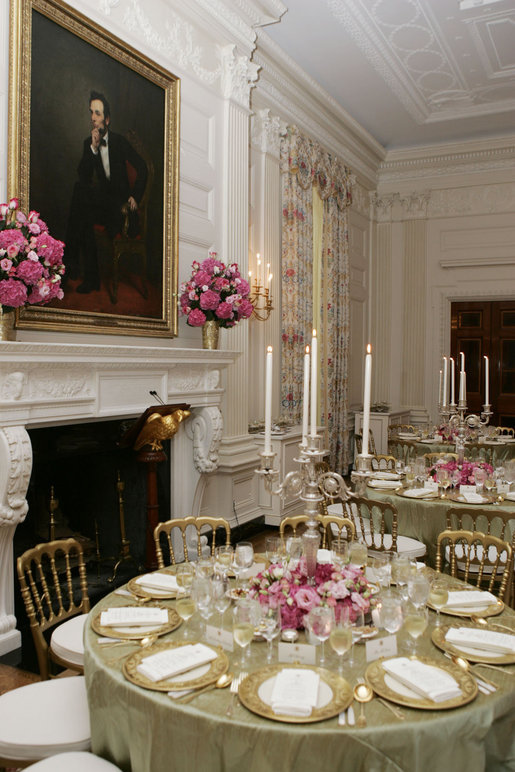
The State Dining Room after the Clinton renovation, set for a state dinner during the administration of George W. Bush.

By the early 1990s, more than 50,000 people a year were being entertained in the State Dining Room. The heavy use left the room shabby and in need of significant repair and conservation.

In December 1998, First Lady Hillary Clinton unveiled a renovated State Dining Room. She was advised by interior designer Kaki Hockersmith (a long-time friend of the Clintons), interior designer Mark Hampton of New York City (who had worked on the White House for President George H. W. Bush and First Lady Barbara Bush), and the Committee for the Preservation of the White House. The room's walls were repainted a light stone color, with architectural details lightly highlighted. The pedestal console tables were stripped of paint which mimicked white marble with gold veining, and their original mahogany finish was restored. The gilded chandelier and wall sconces were polished and brightened. The room's 66 chairs were reupholstered in a gold damask. New ivory silk draperies, manufactured by F. Schumacher & Co., with printed full-color baskets, flowers, and ribbons replicating a 1901 damask design used by the firm, replaced the solid gold fabric drapes of the 1980s. The drapes were designed to reflect the color pattern of the White House china. A $113,031 ($223,270 in 2025 dollars), 43-by-28-foot (13.1 by 8.5 m) carpet with a floral medallion pattern was also installed. The Colonial Revival-style carpet was woven by Scott Group Custom Carpets in Grand Rapids, Michigan. The 1902 silver-plated chandelier and the wall sconces—last gilded in 1961—were refinished, repaired, rewired, and cleaned. Sources differ as to the cost, with one putting it at $270,507 ($534,331 in 2025 dollars) and another at $341,000 ($673,576 in 2025 dollars), but the cost was paid for by the White House Endowment Trust. The Clinton refurbishment was not as successful as hoped. White House Curator William G. Allman noted that at night, the lack of backlighting from outside tended to make the drapes fade into the walls.

The Clintons were also the first to use the East Room for most state dinners, rather than the much smaller State Dining Room. The reason was size: The State Dining Room could accommodate only about 136 people, while the East Room sat 260. The Clintons also used marquees, set up on the South Lawn of the White House, for state dinners, which allowed seating to run as high as 700 individuals. President George W. Bush, however, returned to the practice of hosting state dinners almost exclusively in the State Dining Room. The gold-upholstered chairs were often removed for meals and replaced with smaller chairs from elsewhere in the White House, as they proved too bulky to accommodate large numbers of guests around dining tables.

== Obama renovation ==
By 2011, the heavy wear and tear on the State Dining Room had taken a toll on the rugs and drapes in State Dining Room.

On June 25, 2015, a renovated State Dining Room was unveiled by First Lady Michelle Obama. Mrs. Obama and the Committee for the Preservation of the White House began planning the renovation in 2012. (Note: Michael S. Smith, an interior designer and friend of the Obamas, is a member of the Committee for the Preservation of the White House.) The first element of the renovation, a 28-by-43-foot (8.5 by 13.1 m) carpet, was installed in 2012. The wool rug, (Note: There are two identical rugs, which are regularly switched to reduce wear and tear and allow for cleaning.) woven by Scott Group Custom Carpets, features a border of wreaths surrounding a field of mottled light blue accented by clusters of oak leaves. The carpet's design mimics the plaster molding of the ceiling.

The new silk window draperies are ecru in color, accented with stripes of peacock blue intended to mimic the Kailua blue color of the White House china (which in turn mimics the waters of President Obama's home state of Hawaii). Fabric for the draperies was manufactured by an undisclosed firm in Pennsylvania. The window valances feature heavy swags, with gold bullion fringe, and reflect similar window treatments from the 1800s. The drapes hang from carved and gilded poles whose design echoes that of similar drapery poles in the Red Room and Green Room. The walls and moldings were repainted in various shades of white and glazed, to highlight their details.

A new set of 34 mahogany chairs replaced the Theodore Roosevelt-era Chiavari chairs, which had proved too large and cumbersome. The set includes six armchairs and 28 side chairs. The new chairs were designed to be multifunctional, and fit with both the heavy, main dining table as well as smaller dining rounds. The look of the Obama armchairs is based on chairs designed by Georgetown cabinetmaker William King, Jr. in 1818 for President James Monroe. The side chairs are an adaptation of this design. All the chairs are upholstered in brown horsehair fabric in a grid-like pattern, and trimmed with brass nailheads. The chairs were manufactured by Baker Furniture in Hickory, North Carolina, and the fabric by Brunschwig & Fils.

The White House Endowment Trust paid for the $590,000 renovation.

== Bibliography ==
- Abbott, James A.; Rice, Elaine M. (1998). Designing Camelot: The Kennedy White House Restoration. New York: Van Nostrand Reinhold. ISBN 9780442025328.
- Brooklyn Museum (1979). The American Renaissance, 1876-1917. Brooklyn, N.Y.: Pantheon Books. ISBN 9780394508078.
- Brown, Glenn (January 1916). "Personal Reminiscences of Charles Follen McKim". Architectural Record: 84–88.
- Brown, Glenn (December 17, 1919). "Roosevelt and the Fine Arts". The American Architect: 739–752.
- Brown, Glenn (1931). 1860-1930: Memories. Washington, D.C.: Press of W.F. Roberts Company.
- Buckland, Gail; Culbert-Aguilar, Kathleen (1994). The White House in Miniature: Based on the White House Replica by John, Jan, and the Zweifel Family. New York: W.W. Norton & Co. ISBN 9780393036633.
- Butler, Joseph T.; Johnson, Kathleen Eagen; Skibinski, Ray (1985). Field Guide to American Antique Furniture. New York: Henry Holt. ISBN 9780805001242.
- Cassidy-Geiger, Maureen (2015). "Epergnes". In Goldstein, Darra (ed.). The Oxford Companion to Sugar and Sweets. New York: Oxford University Press. ISBN 9780199313617.
- Creekmore, Betsey Beeler (1968). Traditional American Crafts. New York: Hearthside Press.
- Detweiler, Susan G. (2008). American Presidential China: The Robert L. McNeil, Jr., Collection at the Philadelphia Museum of Art. New Haven, Conn.: Philadelphia Museum of Art and Yale University Press. ISBN 9780876331927.
- Dietz, Ulysses G. (2009). Dream House: The White House as an American Home. New York: Acanthus Press. ISBN 9780926494657.
- Emerson, Jason (2012). Giant in the Shadows: The Life of Robert T. Lincoln. Carbondale, Ill.: Southern Illinois University Press. ISBN 9780809330553.
- Harris, Bill (2002). The White House: An Illustrated Tour. Philadelphia: Courage Books. ISBN 9780762414116.
- Jennings, Paul (1865). A Colored Man's Reminiscences of James Madison. Brooklyn: G.C. Beadle. p. 3. "A colored man's reminiscences of James Madison."
- Klara, Robert (2013). The Hidden White House: Harry Truman and the Reconstruction of America's Most Famous Residence. New York: Thomas Dunne Books. ISBN 9781250000279.
- Monkman, Betty C. (2000). The White House: Its Historic Furnishings & First Families. New York: White House Historical Association. ISBN 9780789206244.
- Peatross, C. Ford; Scott, Pamela; Tepfer, Diane; Freudenheim, Leslie Mandelson (2005). Capital Drawings: Architectural Designs for Washington, D.C., from the Library of Congress. Baltimore: The Johns Hopkins University Press. ISBN 9780801872327.
- Phillips-Schrock, Patrick (2013). The White House: An Illustrated Architectural History. Jefferson, N.C.: McFarland & Company. ISBN 9780786471522.
- Remini, Robert V. (1998). Andrew Jackson. Volume 3: The Course of American Democracy, 1833-1845. Baltimore, Md.: Johns Hopkins University Press. ISBN 9781421413303.
- "Restoration of the White House". The American Architect and Building News: 67–70. February 28, 1903.
- Ross, Betty (1986). A Museum Guide to Washington, D.C.: Museums, Historic Houses, Art Galleries, Libraries, and Special Places Open to the Public in the Nation's Capital and Vicinity. Washington, D.C.: Americana Press. ISBN 9780961614409.
- Ross, Ishbel (1973). The President's Wife: Mary Todd Lincoln, A Biography. New York: Putnam. ISBN 9780399111327.
- Scott, Stuart D. (2004). To the Outskirts of Habitable Creation: Americans and Canadians Transported to Tasmania in the 1840s. New York: iUniverse. ISBN 9780595665617.
- Seale, William (2001). The White House: The History of an American Idea. Washington, D.C.: White House Historical Association. ISBN 9780912308852.
- Sidey, Hugh (September 1, 1961). "The First Lady Brings History and Beauty to the White House". Life. pp. 54–65.
- Snow, Peter (2014). When Britain Burned the White House: The 1814 Invasion of Washington. New York: Thomas Dunne Books/St. Martin's Press. ISBN 9781466848948.
- Truman, Margaret (1995). First Ladies: An Intimate Group Portrait of White House Wives. New York: Fawcett. ISBN 9780449223239.
- Wallner, Peter A. (2007). Franklin Pierce. Volume 2. Concord, N.H.: Plainswede Publishing. ISBN 9780975521618.
- Watson, Robert P. (2004). "At Home With the First Families". In Watson, Robert P. (ed.). Life in the White House: A Social History of the First Family and the President's House. Albany, N.Y.: State University of New York Press. ISBN 9781423739876.
- White House Historical Association (1995). The White House: An Historic Guide. Washington, D.C.: White House Historical Association. ISBN 9780912308616.
- Wiencek, Henry; Lucey, Donna M. (1999). National Geographic Guide to America's Great Houses: More Than 150 Outstanding Mansions Open to the Public. Washington, D.C.: National Geographic Society. ISBN 9780792274247.
