= Grand Staircase (White House) =

Staircase in the White House

Coordinates: 38.8977°N 77.0364°W

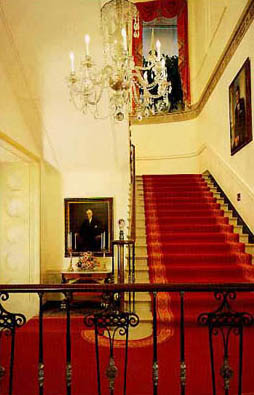
The Grand Staircase looking north seen from the Cross Hall during the administration of Bill Clinton.

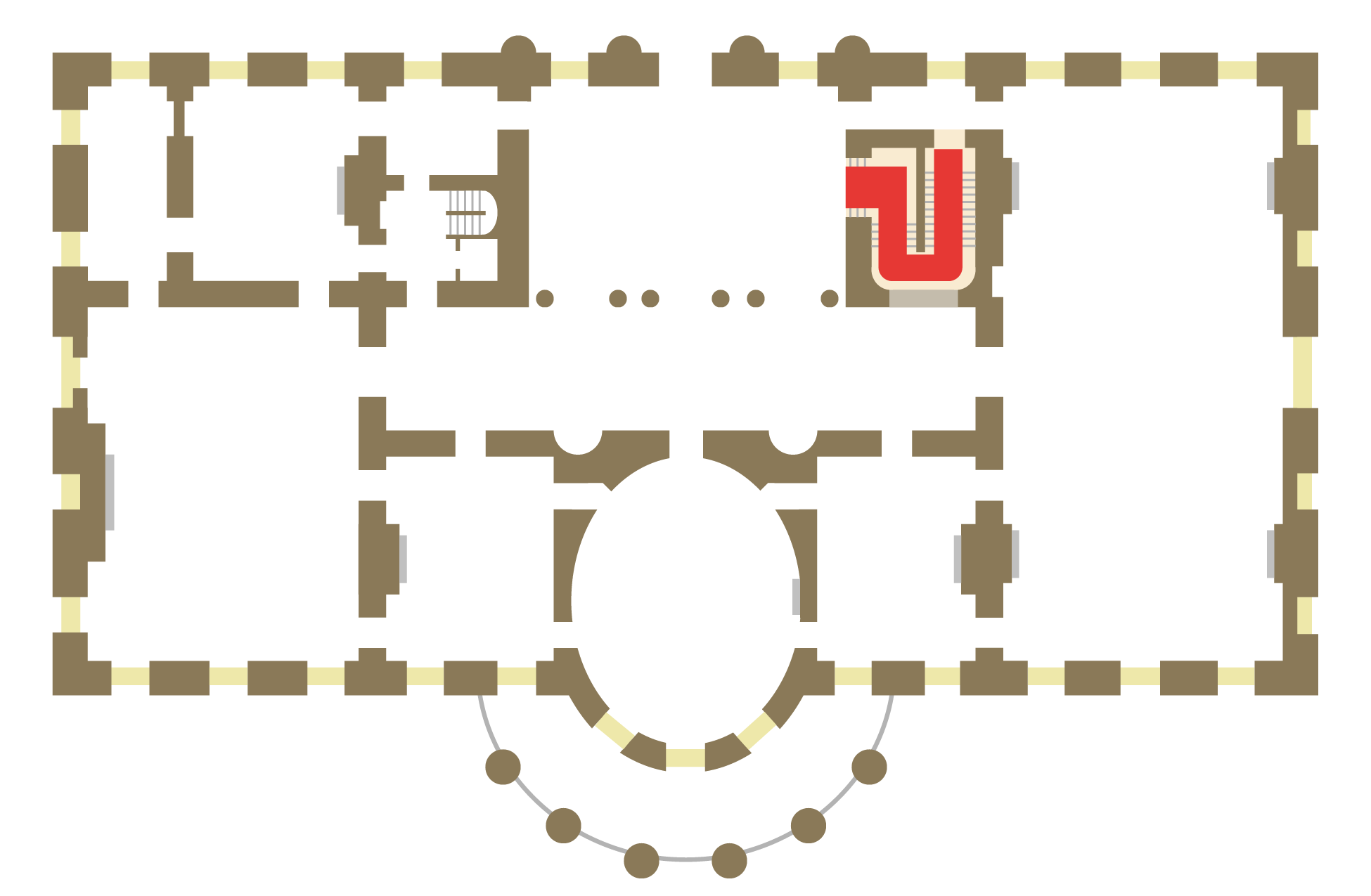
White House State Floor showing the location of the Grand Staircase.

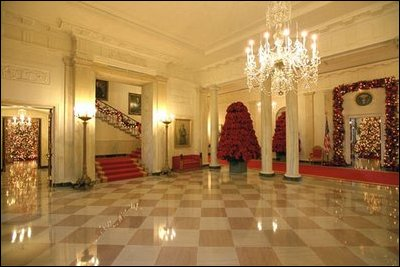
White House Entrance Hall at Christmastime during George W. Bush’s administration with the Grand Staircase on the left.

The Grand Staircase is the chief stairway connecting the State Floor and the Second Floor of the White House, the official home of the president of the United States. The stairway is primarily used for a ceremony called the Presidential Entrance March. The present Grand Staircase, the fourth staircase occupying the same general space, was completed in 1952 as a part of the Truman White House reconstruction. The Grand Staircase is entered on the State Floor from the Entrance Hall.

== Hoban and Latrobe’s staircases ==
Though White House architect James Hoban originally located the main ceremonial staircase at the west end of the Cross Hall, he placed a staircase in the present site of the Grand Staircase in both his initial 1793 plan and 1814 reconstruction designs. No section study exists to illustrate either of Hoban’s staircases. Hoban’s original design of the Grand Staircase at the west end of the Cross Hall was altered by Benjamin Henry Latrobe in 1803 during the administration of Thomas Jefferson. Hoban envisioned the Imperial stair form with a single central stair rising from the east to a landing on the west wall with double runs returning to the east on each side. Latrobe's alteration placed a double run on either side rising from the west to a landing on the east and a single run returning west to the second floor.

== McKim's new Grand Staircase ==
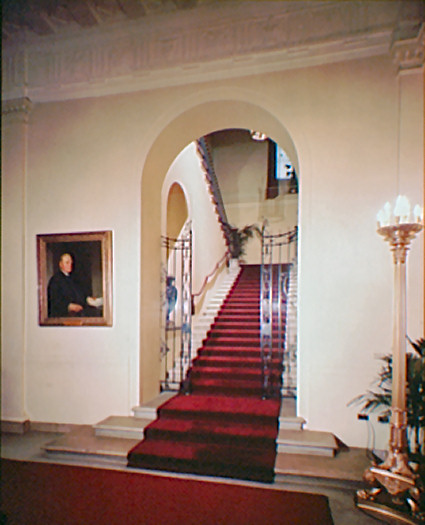
Charles Follen McKim's Grand Staircase looking north, northwest seen from the Cross Hall photographed during the administration of Harry Truman before reconstruction.

In 1902, President Theodore Roosevelt engaged architect Charles Follen McKim, of the firm McKim, Mead, and White, to reconfigure and redesign the White House. McKim’s plan removed the Grand Staircase at the West End of the Cross Hall to increase the size of the State Dining Room by more than a third. McKim relocated the new Grand Staircase in the eastern end of the Cross Hall, opposite the entrance to the Green Room in the site of Hoban's less formal east staircase.

McKim's Grand Staircase adopted the Imperial stair form: a central run beginning on the south and rising to a landing on the north, with double runs doubling back to the south as it rises to the second floor. Formal in plan, its relatively narrow opening into the Cross Hall limited visibility of the President, First Lady and their official guests. McKim's Grand Staircase was entered through an arched opening with the first two steps protruding into the Cross Hall. A decorated wrought iron gate on the State Floor was normally kept closed except during state ceremonies. A pair of niches flanked the center run and the first course used a heavy crimson silk cord as a decorative railing. The stair was constructed in Joliet marble and covered in a crimson stair carpet. A lantern similar to one selected by McKim for the Entrance Hall was hung above the landing.

== Delano, Winslow and the Truman reconstruction ==
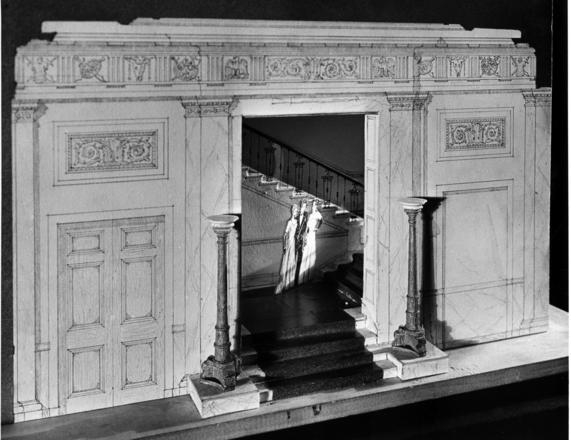
A maquette made by Lorenzo Winslow showing entrance to the Grand Staircase from the Entrance Hall. In the final design the bottom stairs did not project into the Entrance Hall.

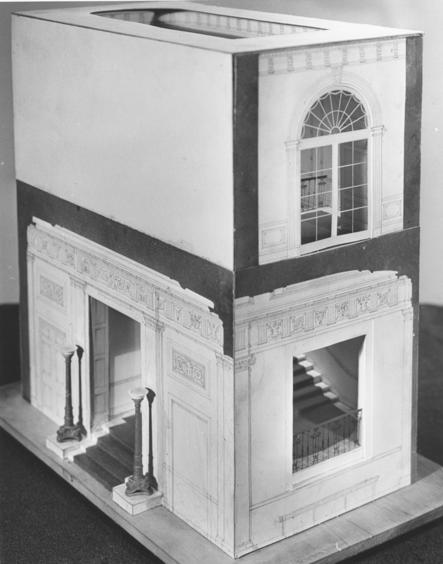
A maquette made by Lorenzo Winslow exploring the structure of the Grand Staircase.

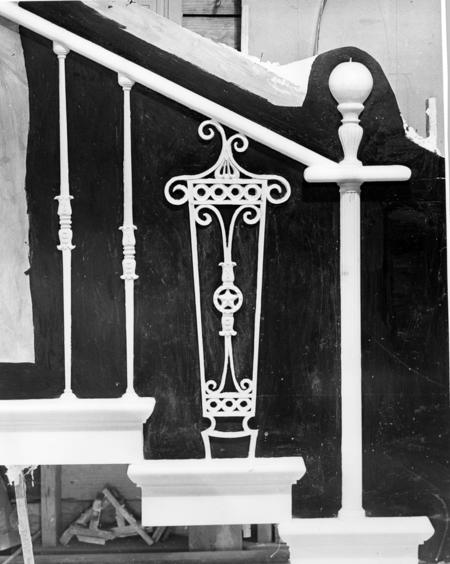
Plaster model by Lorenzo Winslow for the balusters of the Grand Staircase.

Years of hastily made alterations, including the structural changes made by McKim and later with the addition of an attic story during the Coolidge administration, took a major physical toll on the structural integrity of the White House. Cracks appearing in walls and ceilings, and a sagging East Room ceiling in 1948 signaled that immediate attention was needed. To save the White House, President Truman set in place a process of dismantling the interior structure, constructing a load-bearing internal steel structure, and reconstructing the interior rooms within the new framework.

The chief architect of the Truman White House reconstruction was William Adams Delano, with a temporary Office of the White House Architect headed by Lorenzo Simmons Winslow. Truman viewed the White House reconstruction as an opportunity to address the redesign of the Great Staircase. By January 1949 Winslow had produced a design that Truman was near to approving. It closed the Cross Hall opening and reoriented the opening of the new Grand Staircase to the east wall of the Entrance Hall. In the favored design Winslow deleted the paired Roman Doric column screen.

Truman sought approval of Winslow's design from the more senior Delano, who was dismayed by the plans and elevations; he feared that dismantling the columns and the Cross Hall opening created by McKim was a serious mistake. Delano was so concerned about the design he travelled to Washington to meet with Truman and Winslow in person to work out a solution. Winslow prepared a series of detailed architectural models called maquettes to explore the design of the Grand Staircase and how it related to the Entrance Hall and Cross Hall. The paired Doric columns were retained, and an opening in the Cross Hall looking into the Grand Staircase were unanimously agreed upon.

Construction of the staircase proceeded using several cream and taupe colored marbles including Vermont Westland cream. The new Grand Staircase was framed by a rectilinear archway, with the interior side walls faced with the seals of the original 13 states. Above the opening facing the Cross Hall was a plaster arch with a spread American eagle in bas relief with a corona of 13 radiating arrows. A contrasting marble string course with triglyphs and five pointed stars projected around the stairwell at the landing. Winslow designed a custom railing with cast iron balusters that incorporated the five pointed federal star within a circle he used in the carved moulding.

== Decoration ==
A stair carpet in a shade of red has been used since the administration of Theodore Roosevelt. During the Kennedy restoration, the carpet was made deeper, more crimson. A mahogany pier table with gilded caryatid supports attributed to New York cabinetmaker Charles-Honoré Lannuier is located at the bottom of the stair. Portraits of 20th century presidents and first ladies hang on the walls. An English cut crystal chandelier of the mid-19th century hangs over the first landing. In 1998 Hillary Clinton working with then Curator of the White House Betty Monkman refurbished the Grand Staircase. A new carpet for the Grand Staircase and the Cross Hall was designed incorporating a border of laurel leaves and five pointed stars within a circle, a motif found in Winslow's carved marble Truman era string course entablature and in the balusters of the Grand Staircase. A more vivid red was selected, and several shaded of yellow gold. New swag and jabot drapery in the same red and yellow-gold colors were made for the staircase and Entrance Hall.
