= White House basement =

Structure in Washington, D.C.

Coordinates: 38.8976°N 77.0365°W

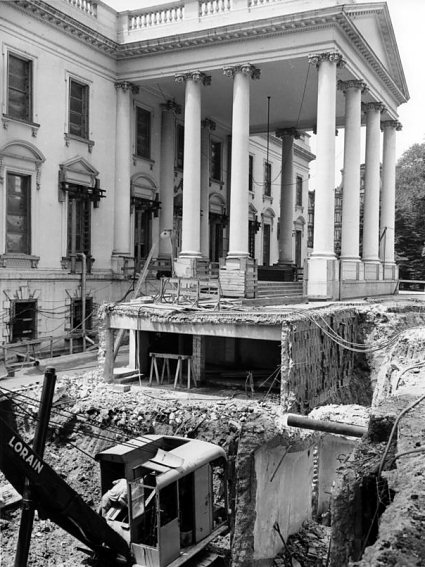
Digging the basement under North Portico in 1950 during White House Truman reconstruction.

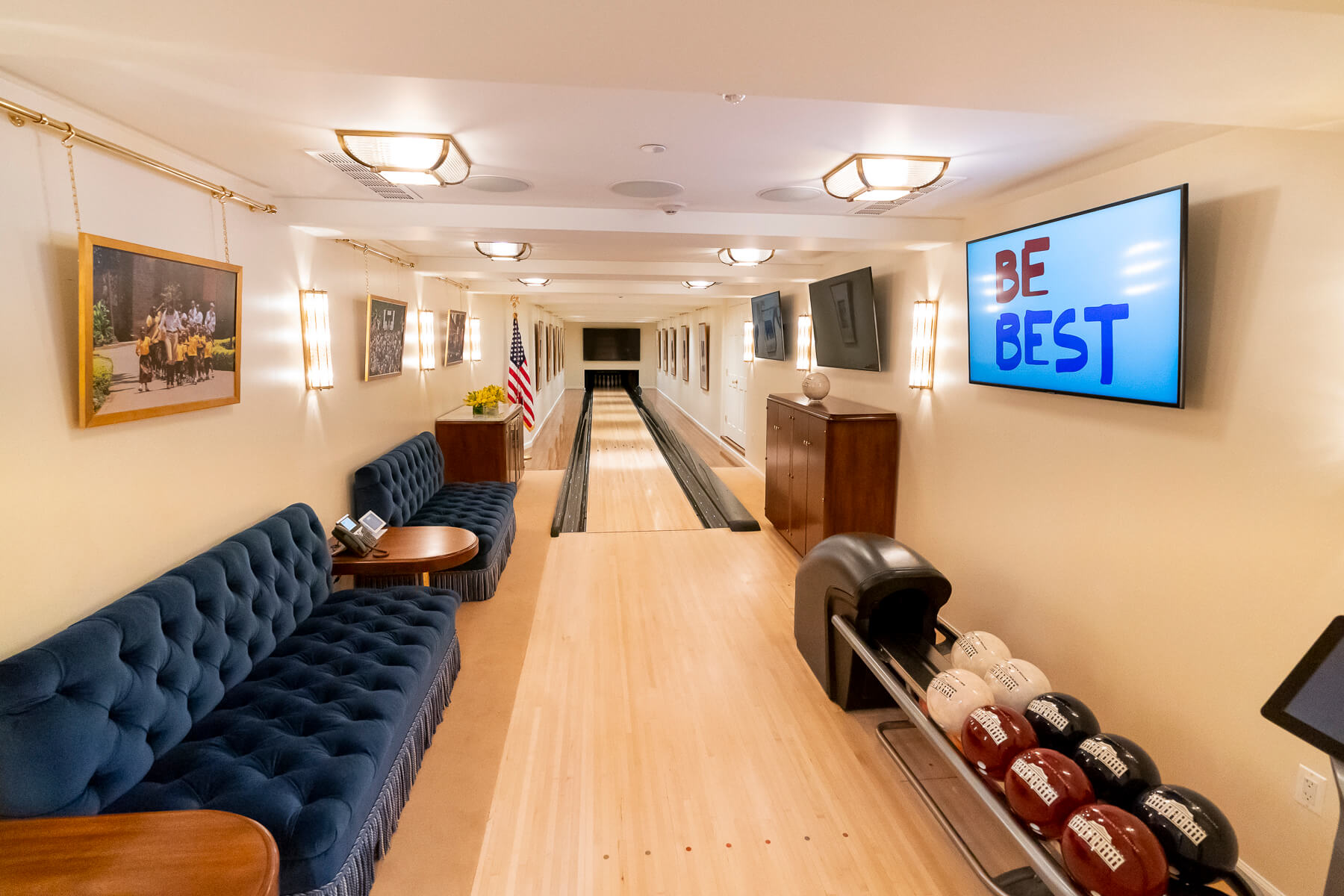
The White House bowling alley in 2019, displaying the logo of Melania Trump's Be Best campaign

The White House Basement is located under the North Portico of the residence and workplace of the president of the United States. It houses the White House carpenters' shop, engineers' shop, bowling alley, flower shop, and dentist office, among other areas. It also houses the White House Situation Room beneath the West Wing.

== History ==
During World War II, a bomb shelter was constructed under the East Wing, later converted into the Presidential Emergency Operations Center.

The sub-basement was added during the reconstruction of the White House under Harry S. Truman. It contains storage space, the laundry, elevator control machinery, the water softener, and incinerator, as well as dressing rooms for White House performers.

Dwight Eisenhower made the first White House television broadcast from a special room in the basement in 1953, though the "broadcast room" was soon divided for other purposes.

A bowling alley was added by Richard Nixon in 1973. There had previously been a bowling alley in the West Wing, built for President Truman in 1947, which had been moved to the Old Executive Office Building in 1955.

After the Recording Industry Association of America suggested that the White House Library should be expanded to include sound recordings, that trade group donated over 2,200 LPs during the Nixon and Carter administrations; when Ronald Reagan took office, the collection was moved to the White House basement, where it is still located.

During President Donald Trump's first term, First Lady Melania Trump oversaw the complete renovation of the Queens' Bedroom and Bathroom, the conservation of the historic Zuber wall covering in the President's Dining Room, and preservation work on the East Room floor, the State Entrance and Hall marble floors, the President's Elevator, and the White House Bowling Alley.
