= Queens' Sitting Room =

Room of the White House

Coordinates: 38°53′52″N 77°2′10.4″W

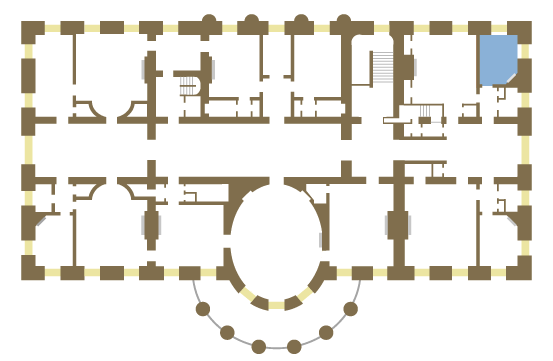
Floor plan of the White House second floor showing location of the Queens' Sitting Room.

The Queens' Sitting Room is a small sitting room located in the northeast corner of the second floor of the White House. It was used as part of the president's offices until 1902 when the West Wing was built. The room became a sitting room for guests in the Queens' Bedroom (then called the Rose Bedroom or Pink Bedroom) in 1902. As a part of the Kennedy White House restoration the room was redecorated by Stéphane Boudin of the firm Maison Jansen. The walls are covered with a heavy cotton Toile de Jouy fabric. Black lacquered furniture of the early and mid-19th century provides contrast with the white painted wainscot and trim of the room.

Lady Bird Johnson enjoyed this room's privacy and used it as a retreat when she had work that required more concentration than she could find at her desk in her bedroom.
