= White House Big Dig =

White House construction project

The White House Big Dig was the name used in press reports to describe a multi-year construction project at the White House that began in September 2010 and temporarily concluded in 2012, with a second phase planned for the future. According to the General Services Administration (GSA), the $376-million project, which involved a multi-story excavation adjacent to the West Wing, was to replace electrical wiring and update air conditioning. A second phase of the project, with an unannounced start date, will involve a similar excavation adjacent to the East Wing. Funds for the White House Big Dig were allocated by a congressional appropriation made in late 2001.

Despite the utilitarian description of its purpose, the project came to be the object of intense media speculation. The Washington Post characterized the GSA description of the project as a "nothing to see here story" while The New York Times, citing an anonymous source, claimed it was "security-related construction". The Associated Press reported that a privacy screen was placed around the construction site for its duration and sub-contractors on the project were required to cover identifying marks or logos on their company vehicles, measures which it implied were unusual. ABC News, meanwhile, equated the construction project as a "mystery" on-par with "what happened to the dinosaurs". In a story set to the theme song from the science fiction television program The X-Files, reporter John Berman sarcastically commented "maybe it is a bunch of pipes and wires ... just like Area 51".

In 2013, RealClearPolitics reported that a "clone" of the Oval Office would be built in the Eisenhower Executive Office Building, as the Oval Office would be unusable during the second phase of the White House Big Dig. White House press secretary Jay Carney subsequently rebutted that report as false.

The Washington Post reported in 2026 that the work included the installation of a new bunker intended to replace the World War II-era Presidential Emergency Operations Center. Located more than 60 feet (18 m) underground and built into the bedrock, the bunker is accessible via a private elevator and designed to withstand a nuclear blast, has its own separate airflow system, and contains provisions for a group to survive inside for months.
