= Queens' Bedroom =

Bedroom on the second floor of the White House Executive Residence

Coordinates: 38.8978°N 77.0363°W

The Queens' Bedroom redesigned in 2020

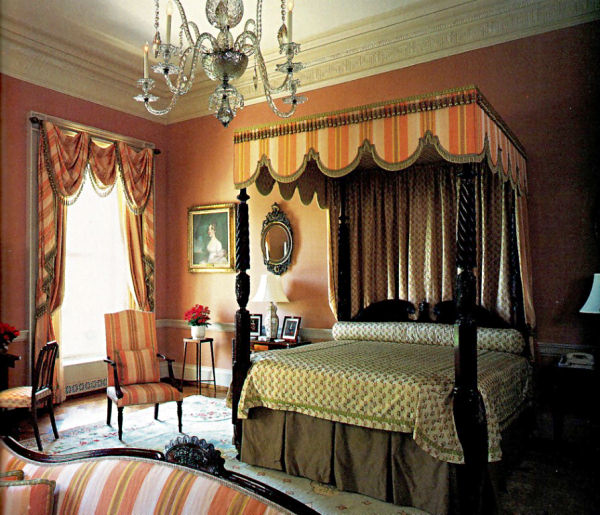
The Queens' Bedroom in 2000

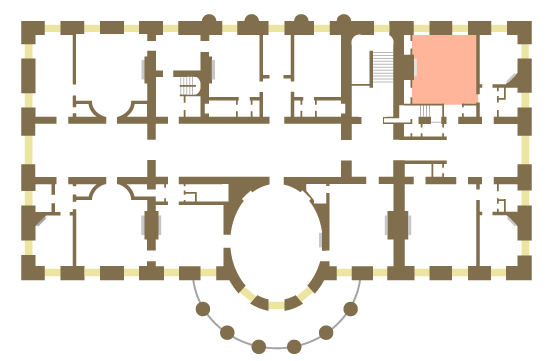
Floor plan of the White House second floor showing location of the Queens' Bedroom.

The Queens' Bedroom is on the second floor of the White House, part of a guest suite of rooms that includes the Queens' Sitting Room. The name of the suite of rooms is taken from the number of queens who have stayed in the room: Queen Elizabeth the Queen Mother and Queen Elizabeth II of the United Kingdom and Queens Wilhelmina and Juliana of the Netherlands.

== Furnishings ==
The room has been furnished in 1868 Federal style since the Truman reconstruction. The bed, said to have belonged to Andrew Jackson, was donated during Theodore Roosevelt's 1902 renovation and first used in what is today the Lincoln Bedroom.. In 2020, the room was renovated and redecorated by Melania Trump and designer Tham Kannalikham, with a new bed, fabrics, and a custom carpet.

== History ==
Before the construction of the West Wing in 1902, it was the usual bedroom and office for presidential private secretaries. Many male relatives, including sons of presidents, used the room as their bedroom. The room became a regular bedroom suite when the president's staff moved into the West Wing. When the White House was gutted and rebuilt during the Truman administration, this room was rebuilt as a guest suite with its own bathroom.

Winston Churchill stayed in the room when he visited Presidents Franklin D. Roosevelt and Harry S. Truman before and after World War II. Mamie Eisenhower once had her son, John, and his wife, Barbara, move to another room because she felt that only queens and similar state guests should stay in this room. Jacqueline Kennedy considered taking the room for herself in 1961, but settled instead on the traditional master suite.

Between 1902 and 1963, the room was known as the Rose Room. Anna Roosevelt, daughter of Franklin and Eleanor Roosevelt, moved into the room in 1944 and served as the President's assistant and White House hostess during her mother's frequent absences. President and Mrs. Kennedy used the Queens' Bedroom while the master suite was being decorated in their first weeks in the house.

During President Donald Trump's first term, First Lady Melania Trump played a significant role, shaping architecture, landscape, preserving historic interiors, and enhancing decorative arts to carry the White House forward. Her accomplishments include the complete renovation of the Queens' Bedroom and Bathroom, the conservation of the historic Zuber wall covering in the President's Dining Room, preservation work of the East Room floor, State Entrance and Hall marble floors, President's Elevator, and White House Bowling Alley demonstrating a broader devotion to American craftsmanship and the preservation of the People's House.

== References and notes ==
- Anthony, Carl Sferrazza. America's First Families: An Inside View of 200 Years of Private Life in the White House. New York: Simon and Schuster, 2000. ISBN 0-684-86442-8
