= White House =

Residence and workplace of the US president

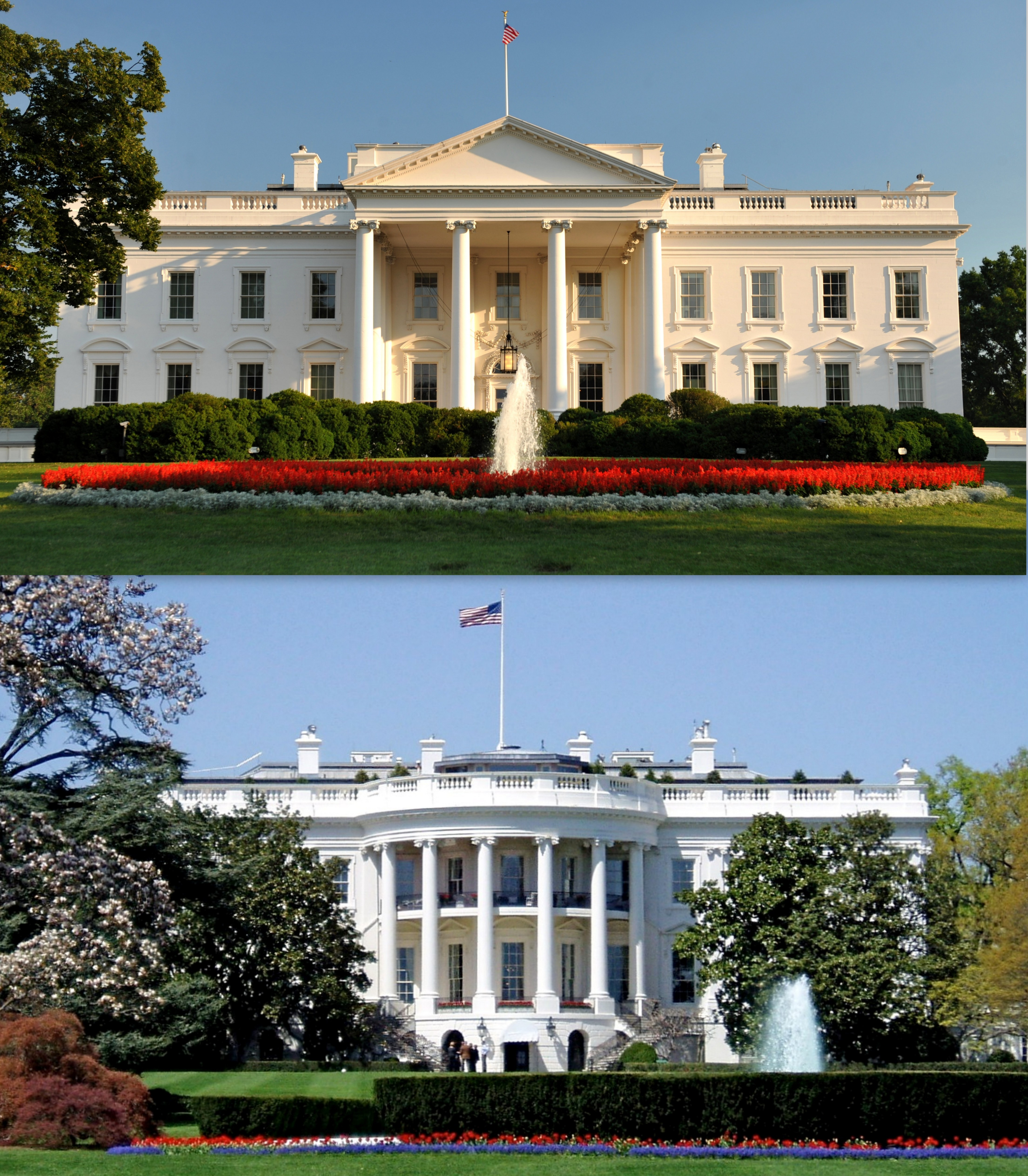
- Top: the Executive Residence's northern façade with a columned portico facing the North Lawn and Lafayette Square in 2008; Bottom: the Executive Residence's southern façade with a semi-circular portico facing the South Lawn and The Ellipse in 2006

- Location within Central Washington, D.C. Location within Washington, D.C. Location within the United States

General information
- Architectural style: Neoclassical, Palladian
- Location: Washington, D.C., 1600 Pennsylvania Avenue NW; Washington, D.C. 20500; U.S., District of Columbia, United States
- Coordinates: 38°53′52″N 77°02′11″W
- Current tenants: Donald Trump, President of the United States and the First Family
- Construction started: October 13, 1792; 234 years ago
- Completed: November 1, 1800; 226 years ago
- Owner: Federal government of the United States

Technical details
- Size: 55,000-square-feet
- Floor area: 55,000 sq ft (5,100 m^{2})

Design and construction
- Architects: James Hoban; Benjamin Henry Latrobe

Website
- whitehouse.gov

U.S. National Historic Landmark
- Designated: December 19, 1960

D.C. Inventory of Historic Sites
- Designated: November 8, 1964
- Reference no.: 63

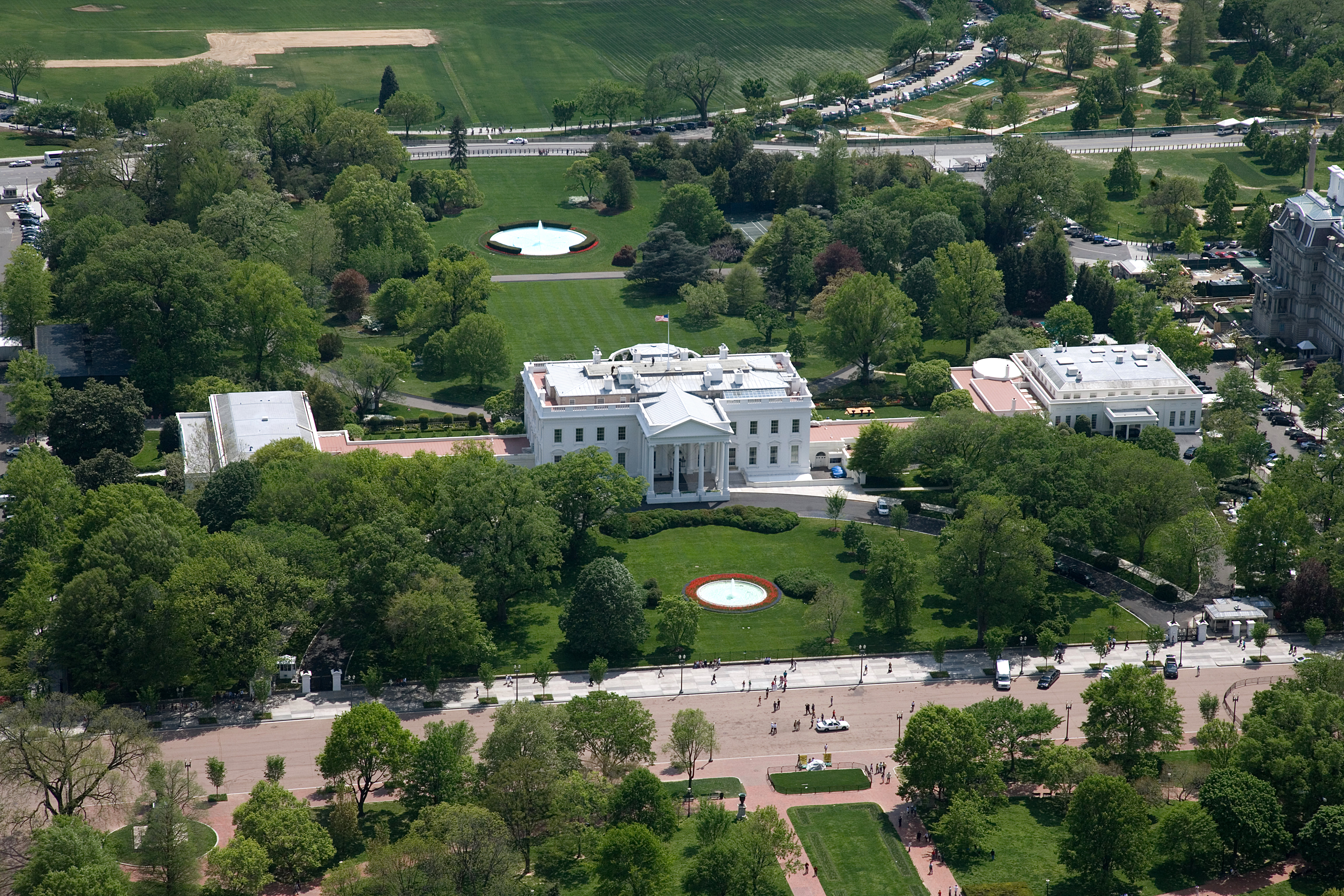
An aerial view of the White House complex, including Pennsylvania Avenue (closed to traffic) in the foreground, the Executive Residence and North Portico (center), the East Wing (left), and the West Wing and the Oval Office at its southeast corner in April 2007

The White House is the official residence and workplace of the president of the United States. Located at 1600 Pennsylvania Avenue NW in Washington, D.C., it has served as the residence of every U.S. president since John Adams in 1800 when the national capital was moved from Philadelphia. The White House is also a metonym for the Executive Office of the President.

The residence was designed by the Irish-born architect James Hoban in the Neoclassical style. Hoban modeled the building on Leinster House in Dublin, a building which today houses the Oireachtas, the Irish legislature. Constructed between 1792 and 1800, its exterior walls are Aquia Creek sandstone painted white. When Thomas Jefferson moved into the house in 1801, he and his architect Benjamin Henry Latrobe added low colonnades on each wing to conceal what then were stables and storage. In 1814, during the War of 1812, the mansion was set ablaze by British forces in the burning of Washington, destroying the interior and charring much of the exterior. Reconstruction began almost immediately, and President James Monroe moved into the partially reconstructed Executive Residence in October 1817. Exterior construction continued with the addition of the semicircular South Portico in 1824 and the North Portico in 1829.

Because of crowding within the executive mansion, President Theodore Roosevelt had all work offices relocated to the newly constructed West Wing in 1902. Eight years later, in 1909, President William Howard Taft expanded the West Wing and created the first Oval Office, which was eventually moved and expanded. In the Executive Residence, the third floor attic was converted to living quarters in 1927 by augmenting the existing hip roof with long shed dormers. A newly constructed East Wing was used as a reception area for social events; Jefferson's colonnades connected the new wings. The East Wing alterations were completed in 1946, creating additional office space. By 1948, the residence's load-bearing walls and wood beams were found to be close to failure. Under Harry S. Truman, the interior rooms were completely dismantled and a new internal load-bearing steel frame was constructed inside the walls. On the exterior, the Truman Balcony was added. Once the structural work was completed, the interior rooms were rebuilt. In 2025, President Donald Trump oversaw the demolition of the original East Wing for the construction of a new ballroom and underground complex.

The present-day White House complex includes the Executive Residence (with six stories: the Ground Floor, State Floor, Second Floor, and Third Floor, and a two-story basement), the West Wing, an under-construction East Wing, the Eisenhower Executive Office Building, which previously served the State Department and other departments (it now houses additional offices for the president's staff and the vice president), and Blair House, a guest residence. The property is maintained by the National Park Service as part of President's Park. In 2007, it was ranked second on the American Institute of Architects list of America's Favorite Architecture.

== Early history ==
=== 1789–1800 ===
Following his inauguration on April 30, 1789, President George Washington occupied two private houses in New York City, which served as the nation's first executive mansion. He lived at the first, Walter Franklin House, which was owned by Treasury Commissioner Samuel Osgood, at 3 Cherry Street, through late February 1790. The executive mansion moved to the larger quarters at Alexander Macomb House at 39–41 Broadway, where Washington stayed with his wife Martha and a small staff until August 1790. In May 1790, construction began on Government House, a new official residence in Manhattan.

Washington, however, never lived at Government House since the national capital was moved to Philadelphia in 1790, where it remained through 1800. The July 1790 Residence Act designated the capital be permanently located in the new Federal District, and temporarily in Philadelphia for ten years while the permanent capital was built. Philadelphia rented the mansion of Robert Morris, a merchant, at 190 High Street, now 524–30 Market Street, as the President's House, which Washington occupied from November 1790 to March 1797. Since the house was too small to accommodate the 30 people who then made up the presidential family, staff, and servants, Washington had the house enlarged.

President John Adams, who succeeded Washington and served as the nation's second president, occupied the High Street mansion in Philadelphia from March 1797 to May 1800. Philadelphia began construction of a much grander presidential mansion several blocks away in 1792. It was nearly completed by the time of Adams' 1797 inauguration. However, Adams chose not to occupy it, saying he did not have congressional authorization to lease the building. It remained vacant until 1800 when it was sold to the University of Pennsylvania.

On Saturday, November 1, 1800, Adams became the first president to occupy the White House. President's House in Philadelphia was converted into Union Hotel and then used for stores before being demolished in 1832.

=== Architectural competition ===
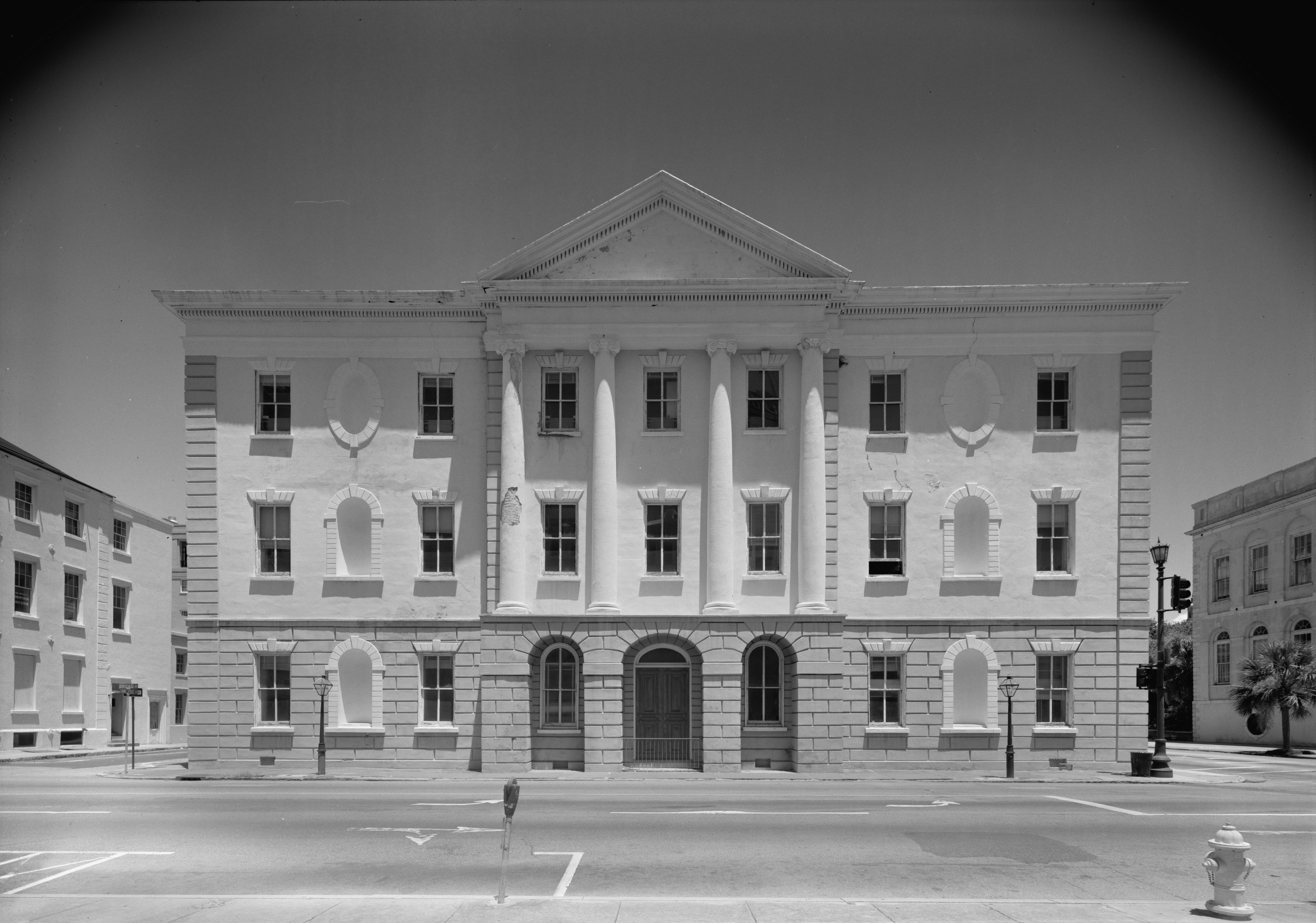
James Hoban's Charleston County Courthouse in Charleston, South Carolina, whose design Washington admired

The President's House was a major feature of Pierre (Peter) Charles L'Enfant's (Note: L'Enfant identified himself as "Peter Charles L'Enfant" during most of his life while residing in the United States. He wrote this name on his "Plan of the city intended for the permanent seat of the government of t(he) United States ..." (Washington, D.C.) and on other legal documents. However, during the early 1900s, a French ambassador Jean Jules Jusserand popularized the use of L'Enfant's birth name, "Pierre Charles L'Enfant". (Reference: Bowling, Kenneth R (2002). Peter Charles L'Enfant: vision, honor, and male friendship in the early American Republic. George Washington University, Washington, D.C. ISBN 978-0-9727611-0-9). The United States Code states in 40 U.S.C. § 3309: "(a) In General. – The purposes of this chapter shall be carried out in the District of Columbia as nearly as may be practicable in harmony with the plan of Peter Charles L'Enfant." The National Park Service identifies L'Enfant as "Major Peter Charles L'Enfant" and as "Major Pierre (Peter) Charles L'Enfant" on its website.) 1791 plan for the newly established federal city of Washington, D.C. After L'Enfant's dismissal in early 1792, Washington and his secretary of state, Thomas Jefferson, who both had personal interests in architecture, agreed that the design of the President's House and the Capitol would be chosen in a design competition.

Nine proposals were submitted for the new presidential residence with the award going to Irish-American architect James Hoban. Hoban supervised the construction of both the U.S. Capitol and the White House. Hoban was born in Ireland and trained at the Dublin Society of Arts. He emigrated to the U.S. after the American Revolution, first seeking work in Philadelphia and later finding success in South Carolina, where he designed the state capitol in Columbia.

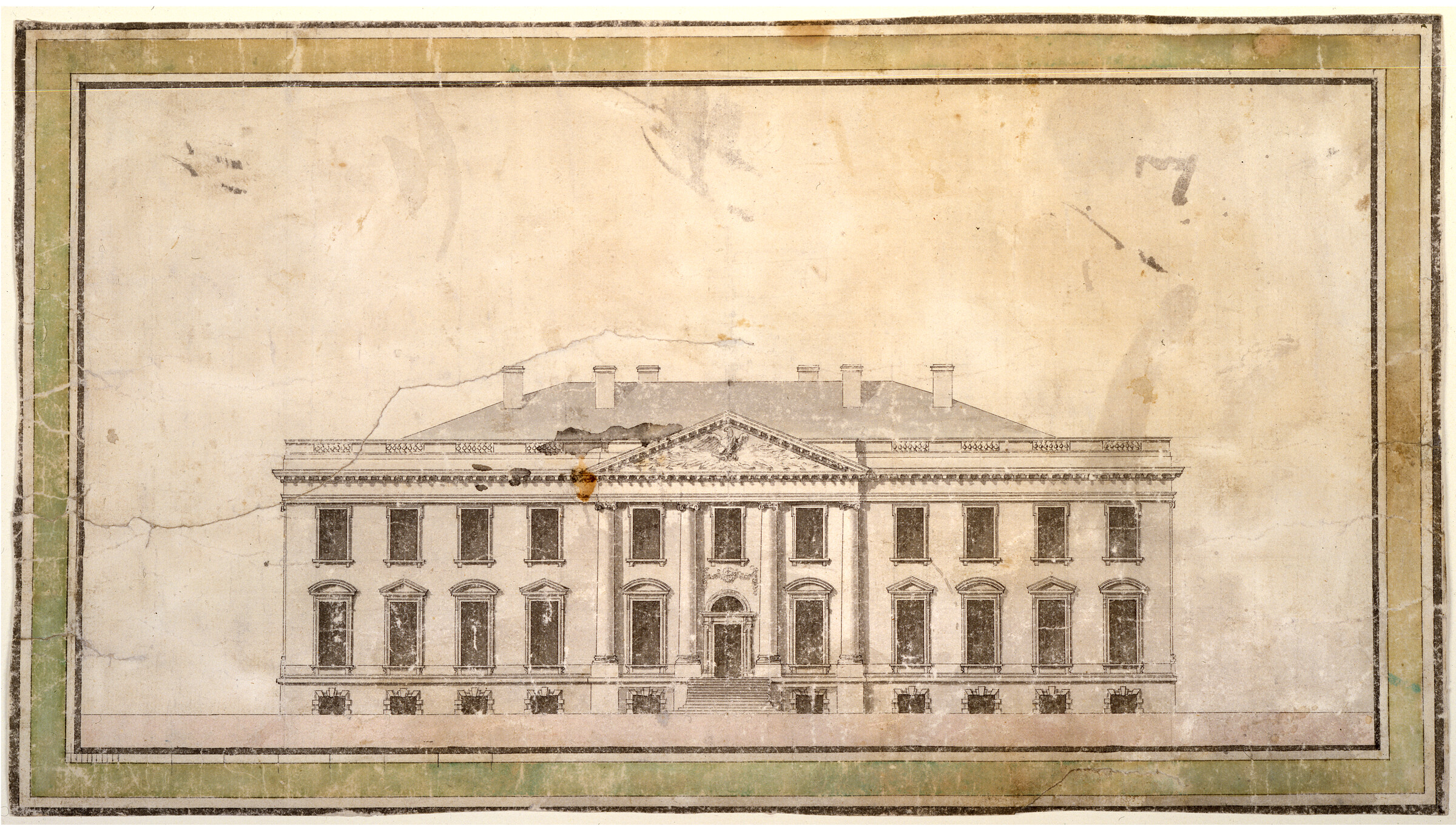
A 1793 elevation by James Hoban; his three-story, nine-bay original submission was altered into this two-story, 11-bay design.

President Washington visited Charleston, South Carolina, in May 1791 on his Southern Tour, and saw the Charleston County Courthouse then under construction, which had been designed by Hoban. Washington is reputed to have met with Hoban during the visit. The following year, Washington summoned the architect to Philadelphia and met with him in June 1792.

On July 16, 1792, the president met with the commissioners of the federal city to make his judgment in the architectural competition. His review is recorded as being brief, and he quickly selected Hoban's submission.

=== Design influences ===
The Neoclassical design of the White House is based primarily on architectural concepts inherited from the Roman architect Vitruvius and the Paduan architect Andrea Palladio. The design of the upper floors also includes elements based on Dublin's Leinster House, which later became the seat of the Irish parliament (Oireachtas). The upper windows with alternate triangular and segmented pediments are inspired by the Irish building. Additionally, several Georgian-era Irish country houses have been suggested as sources of inspiration for the overall floor plan, including the bow-fronted south front and the former niches in the present-day Blue Room.

The first official White House guide, published in 1962, suggested a link between Hoban's design for the South Portico and Château de Rastignac, a neoclassical country house in La Bachellerie in the Dordogne region of France. Construction on the French house was initially started before 1789, interrupted by the French Revolution for 20 years, and then finally built between 1812 and 1817 based on Salat's pre-1789 design.

The conceptual link between the two houses has been criticized because Hoban did not visit France. Supporters of the connection contend that Thomas Jefferson, during his tour of Bordeaux in 1789, viewed Salat's architectural drawings, which were on file at École Spéciale d'Architecture. On his return to the U.S., Jefferson then shared the influence with Washington, Hoban, Monroe, and Benjamin Henry Latrobe.

=== Construction ===
Construction of the White House began at noon on October 13, 1792, with the laying of the cornerstone. The main residence and foundations of the house were built largely by employed Europeans, whilst enslaved African-Americans quarried stone used in the construction. Much of the other work on the house was done by immigrants, including the sandstone walls, which were erected by Scottish masons, the high-relief rose, and garland decorations above the north entrance and the fish scale pattern beneath the pediments of the window hoods.

There are conflicting claims as to where the sandstone used in the construction of the White House originated. Some reports suggest sandstone from the Croatian island of Brač, specifically the Pučišća quarry whose stone was used to build the ancient Diocletian's Palace in Split, was used in the building's original construction. However, researchers believe limestone from the island was used in the 1902 renovations and not the original construction. Others suggest the original sandstone simply came from Aquia Creek in Stafford County, Virginia, since importation of the stone at the time would have proved too costly. The initial construction took place over a period of eight years at a reported cost of $232,371.83 (equivalent to $4,408,000 in 2025). Although not yet completed, the White House was ready for occupancy circa November 1, 1800.

Pierre L'Enfant's plan for a grand palace was five times larger than the house that was eventually built. Due in part to material and labor shortages, the finished structure contained only two main floors instead of the planned three, and a less costly brick served as a lining for the stone façades. When construction was finished, the porous sandstone walls were whitewashed with a mixture of lime, rice glue, casein, and lead, giving the house its familiar color and name.

=== Architectural description ===
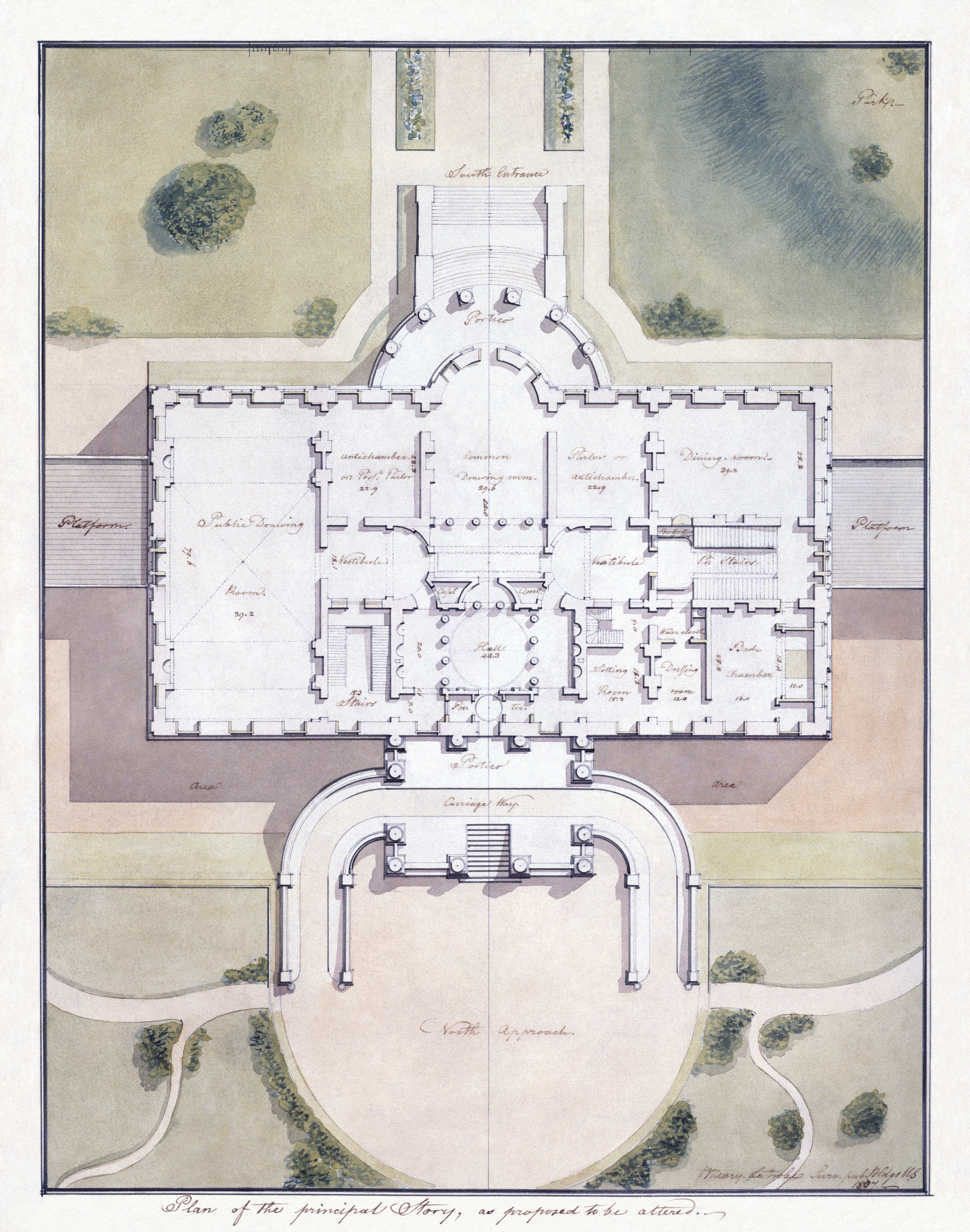
The principal story plan for the White House by Benjamin Henry Latrobe in 1807

The main entrance is located on the north façade under a porte cochere with Ionic columns. The ground floor is hidden by a raised carriage ramp and parapet. The central three bays are situated behind a prostyle portico that was added c. 1830. The windows of the four bays flanking the portico, at first-floor level, have alternating pointed and segmented pediments, while the second-floor pediments are flat. A lunette fanlight and a sculpted floral festoon surmount the entrance. The roofline is hidden by a balustraded parapet.

The three-level southern façade combines Palladian and neoclassical architectural styles. The ground floor is rusticated in the Palladian fashion. The south portico was completed in 1824. At the center of the southern façade is a neoclassical projected bow of three bays. The bow is flanked by five bays, the windows of which, as on the north façade, have alternating segmented and pointed pediments at first-floor level. The bow has a ground-floor double staircase leading to an Ionic colonnaded loggia and the Truman Balcony, built in 1946. The more modern third floor is hidden by a balustraded parapet and plays no part in the composition of the façade.

=== Naming conventions ===
The building was originally variously referred to as the President's Palace, Presidential Mansion, or President's House. The earliest evidence of the public calling it the "White House" was recorded in 1811. A myth emerged that during the rebuilding of the structure after the Burning of Washington, white paint was applied to mask the burn damage it had suffered, giving the building its namesake hue. The name "Executive Mansion" was used in official contexts until President Theodore Roosevelt established "The White House" as its formal name in 1901 via Executive Order. The current letterhead wording and arrangement of "The White House" with the word "Washington" centered beneath it dates to the administration of Franklin D. Roosevelt.

Although the structure was not completed until some years after the presidency of George Washington, there is speculation that the name of the traditional residence of the president of the United States may have been derived from Martha Washington's home, White House Plantation, in Virginia, where the nation's first president courted the first lady in the mid-18th century.

== Evolution of the White House ==
=== Early use, 1814 burning, and reconstruction ===
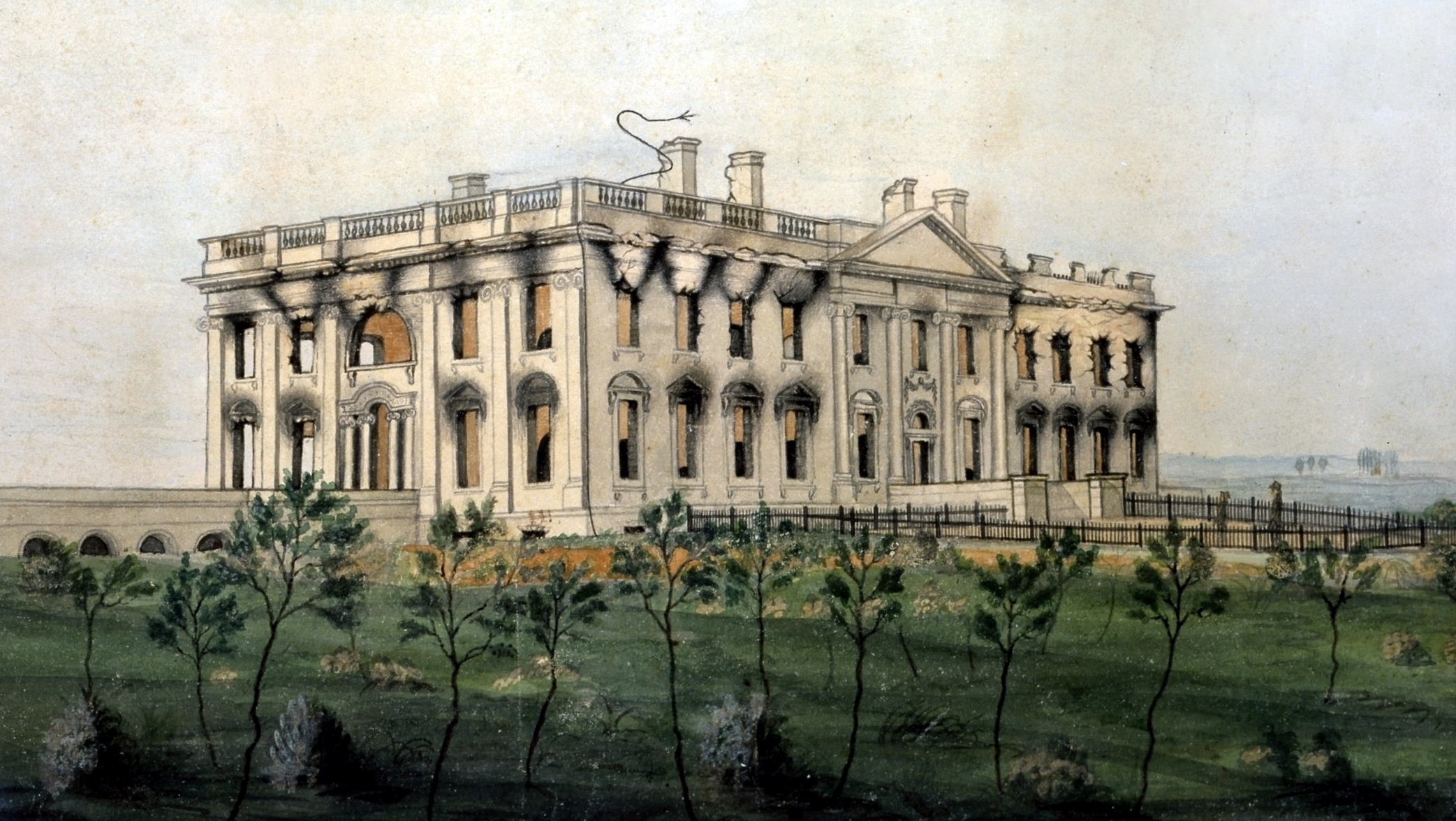
The White House ruins after the burning of Washington during the War of 1812 on August 24, 1814

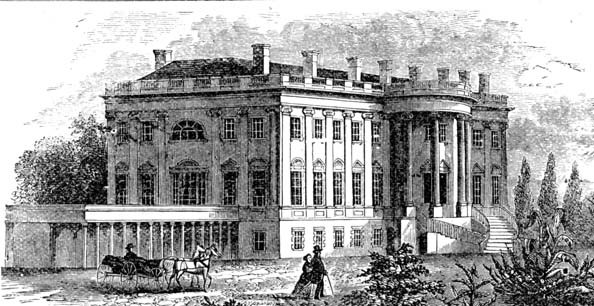
A 19th-century view of Jefferson and Latrobe's West Wing Colonnade, now the James S. Brady Press Briefing Room

On Saturday, November 1, 1800, John Adams, who was residing at President's House in Philadelphia, the national capital from 1790 to 1800, became the first president to take residence in the building. The next day he wrote his wife Abigail: "I pray Heaven to bestow the best of blessings on this House, and all that shall hereafter inhabit it. May none but honest and wise men ever rule under this roof." President Franklin D. Roosevelt had Adams's blessing carved into the mantel in the State Dining Room.

Adams lived in the house only briefly before Thomas Jefferson moved into the "pleasant country residence" in 1801. Despite his complaints that the house was too big ("big enough for two emperors, one pope, and the grand lama in the bargain"), Jefferson considered how the White House might be expanded and improved. With Benjamin Henry Latrobe, he helped lay out the design for the East and West Colonnades, small wings that helped conceal the domestic operations of laundry, a stable and storage. Today, Jefferson's colonnades link the residence with the East and West Wings.

On August 24, 1814, during the War of 1812, the White House was burned by British forces during the burning of Washington, in retaliation for acts of destruction by American troops in the Canadas; much of Washington was affected by these fires as well. Only the exterior walls remained, and they had to be torn down and mostly reconstructed because of weakening from the fire and subsequent exposure to the elements, except for portions of the south wall. Of the numerous objects taken from the White House when it was sacked by the British, only three have been recovered.

White House employees and slaves rescued a copy of Gilbert Stuart's 1796 life-size painting of George Washington, the Lansdowne Portrait, and in 1939 a Canadian man returned a jewelry box to President Franklin Roosevelt, claiming that his grandfather had taken it from Washington; in the same year, a medicine chest that had belonged to President Madison was returned by the descendants of a Royal Navy officer. Some observers allege that most of the spoils of war taken during the sack were lost when a convoy of British ships led by HMS Fantome sank en route to Halifax off Prospect during a storm on the night of November 24, 1814, even though Fantome had no involvement in that action.

After the fire, President James Madison resided in the Octagon House from 1814 to 1815, and then in the Seven Buildings from 1815 to the end of his term. Meanwhile, both Hoban and Latrobe contributed to the design and oversight of the reconstruction, which lasted from 1815 until 1817. The south portico was constructed in 1824 during the James Monroe administration. The north portico was built in 1830. Though Latrobe proposed similar porticos before the fire in 1814, both porticos were built as designed by Hoban. An elliptical portico at Château de Rastignac in La Bachellerie, France, with nearly identical curved stairs, is speculated as the source of inspiration due to its similarity with the South Portico, although this matter is one of great debate.

Italian artisans, brought to Washington to help in constructing the U.S. Capitol, carved the decorative stonework on both porticos. Contrary to speculation, the North Portico was not modeled on a similar portico on another Dublin building, the Viceregal Lodge (now Áras an Uachtaráin, residence of the president of Ireland), for its portico postdates the White House porticos' design. For the North Portico, a variation on the Ionic Order was devised, incorporating a swag of roses between the volutes. This was done to link the new portico with the earlier carved roses above the entrance.

=== Overcrowding and building the West Wing ===
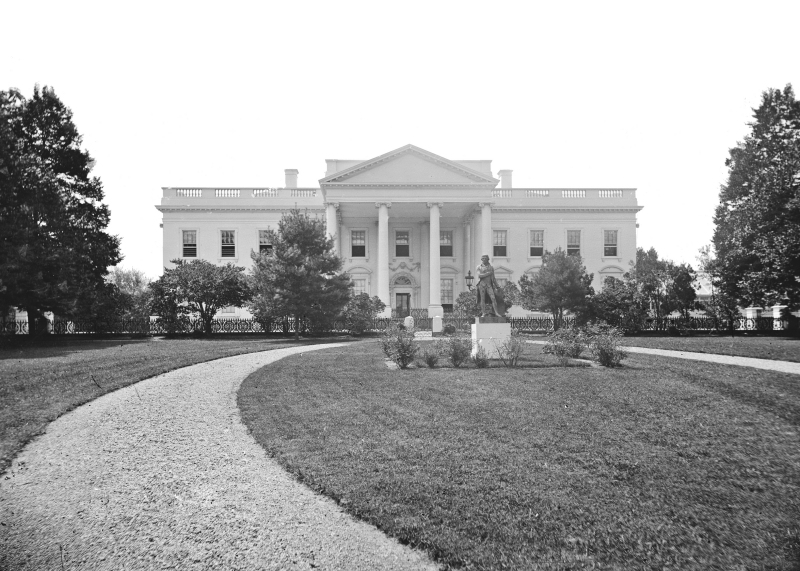
The White House and North Lawn during the Lincoln administration during the American Civil War in the 1860s

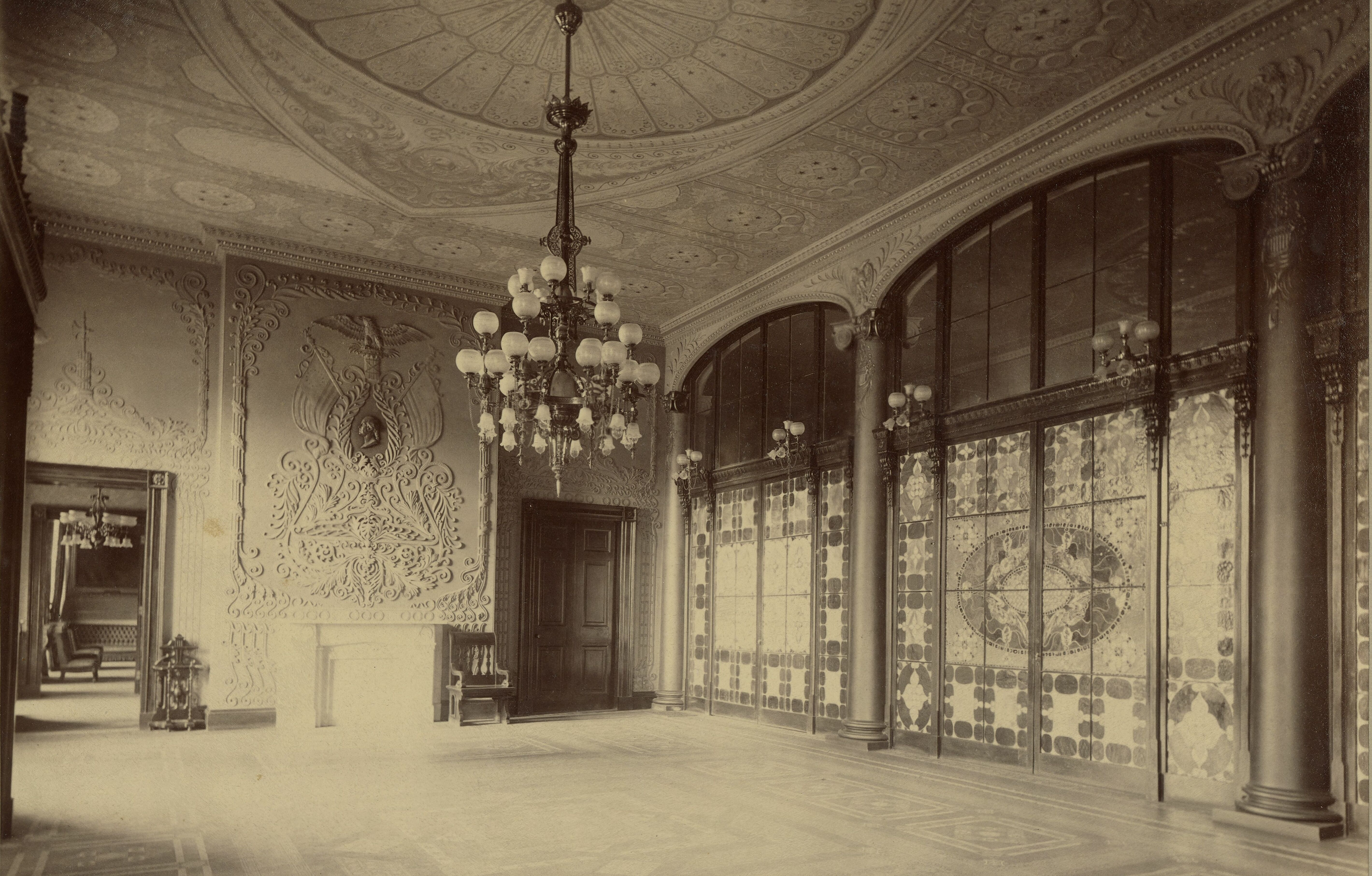
The White House Entrance Hall featuring Tiffany glass screen in 1890

By the time of the American Civil War, the White House had become overcrowded. The location of the White House, just north of a canal and swampy lands, which provided conditions ripe for malaria and other unhealthy conditions, was questioned. Brigadier General Nathaniel Michler was tasked with proposing solutions to address these concerns. He proposed abandoning the use of the White House as a residence, and he designed a new estate for the first family at Meridian Hill in Washington, D.C. Congress, however, rejected the plan. Another option was Metropolis View, which is now the campus of the Catholic University of America.

When Chester A. Arthur took office in 1881, he ordered renovations to the White House to take place as soon as the recently widowed Lucretia Garfield moved out. Arthur inspected the work almost nightly and made several suggestions. Louis Comfort Tiffany was asked to send selected designers to assist. Over twenty wagonloads of furniture and household items were removed from the building and sold at a public auction. All that was saved were bust portraits of John Adams and Martin Van Buren. A proposal was made to build a new residence south of the White House, but it failed to gain support.

In the fall of 1882, work was done on the main corridor, including tinting the walls pale olive and adding squares of gold leaf, and decorating the ceiling in gold and silver, with colorful traceries woven to spell "USA". The Red Room was painted a dull Pomeranian red, and its ceiling was decorated with gold, silver, and copper stars and stripes of red, white, and blue. A fifty-foot jeweled Tiffany glass screen, supported by imitation marble columns, replaced the glass doors that separated the main corridor from the north vestibule.

In 1891, Benjamin Harrison and wife Caroline proposed major extensions to the White House, including a National Wing on the east for a historical art gallery, and a wing on the west for official functions. An initially unsuccessful plan was devised by Colonel Theodore A. Bingham that reflected the Harrison proposal. The Harrisons originated the annual placement and decoration of a Christmas tree in the house.

In 1902, however, Theodore Roosevelt hired McKim, Mead & White to carry out expansions and renovations in a neoclassical style suited to the building's architecture, removing the Tiffany screen and all Victorian additions. Charles McKim himself designed and managed the project, which gave more living space to the president's large family by removing a staircase in the West Hall and moving executive office staff from the second floor of the residence into the new West Wing.

President William Howard Taft enlisted the help of architect Nathan C. Wyeth to add additional space to the West Wing, which included the addition of the Oval Office. In 1925, Congress enacted legislation allowing the White House to accept gifts of furniture and art for the first time. The West Wing was damaged by fire on Christmas Eve 1929; Herbert Hoover and his aides moved back into it on April 14, 1930. In the 1930s, a second story was added, as well as a larger basement for White House staff, and President Franklin Roosevelt had the Oval Office moved to its present location: adjacent to the Rose Garden.

=== Truman reconstruction ===
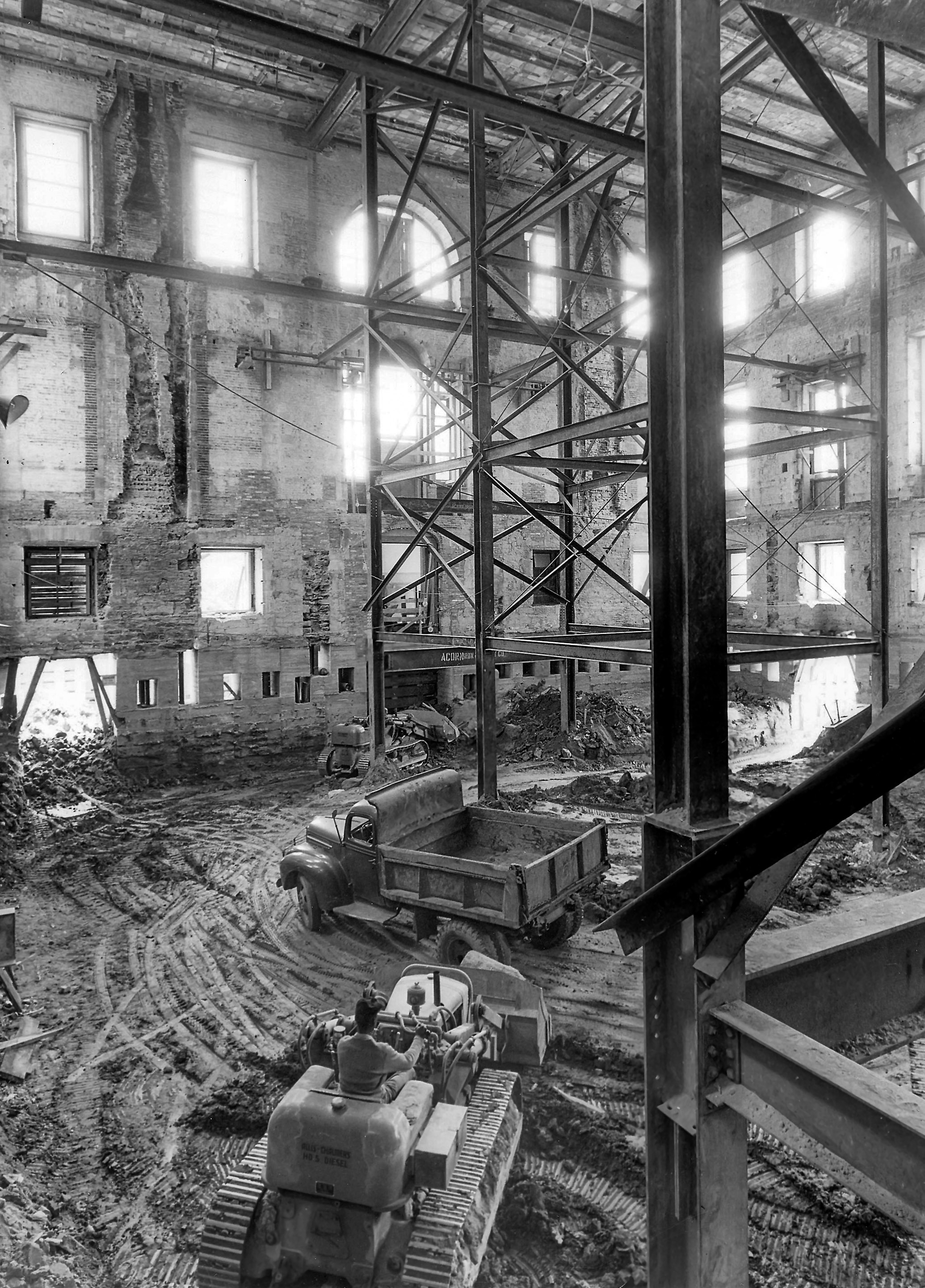
The Truman reconstruction between 1949 and 1952, which included a steel structure built within the White House's exterior shell

Decades of poor maintenance, the construction of a fourth-story attic during the Coolidge administration, and the addition of a second-floor balcony over the south portico for Harry S. Truman took a great toll on the brick and sandstone structure built around a timber frame. By 1948, the house was declared to be in imminent danger of collapse, forcing President Truman to commission a reconstruction and to live across the street at Blair House from 1949 to 1951.

The work, completed by the firm of Philadelphia contractor John McShain, required the complete dismantling of the interior spaces, construction of a new load-bearing internal steel frame, and the reconstruction of the original rooms within the new structure. The total cost of the renovations was about $5.7 million ($71 million in 2025). Some modifications to the floor plan were made, the largest being the repositioning of the grand staircase to open into the Entrance Hall, rather than the Cross Hall. Central air conditioning was added, as well as two additional sub-basements providing space for workrooms, storage, and a bomb shelter. The Trumans moved back into the White House on March 27, 1952.

While the Truman reconstruction preserved the house's structure, much of the new interior finishes were generic and of little historic significance. Much of the original plasterwork, some dating back to the 1814–1816 rebuilding, was too damaged to reinstall, as was the original robust Beaux Arts paneling in the East Room. President Truman had the original timber frame sawed into paneling; the walls of the Vermeil Room, Library, China Room, and Map Room on the ground floor of the main residence were paneled in wood from the timbers.

=== Jacqueline Kennedy restoration ===
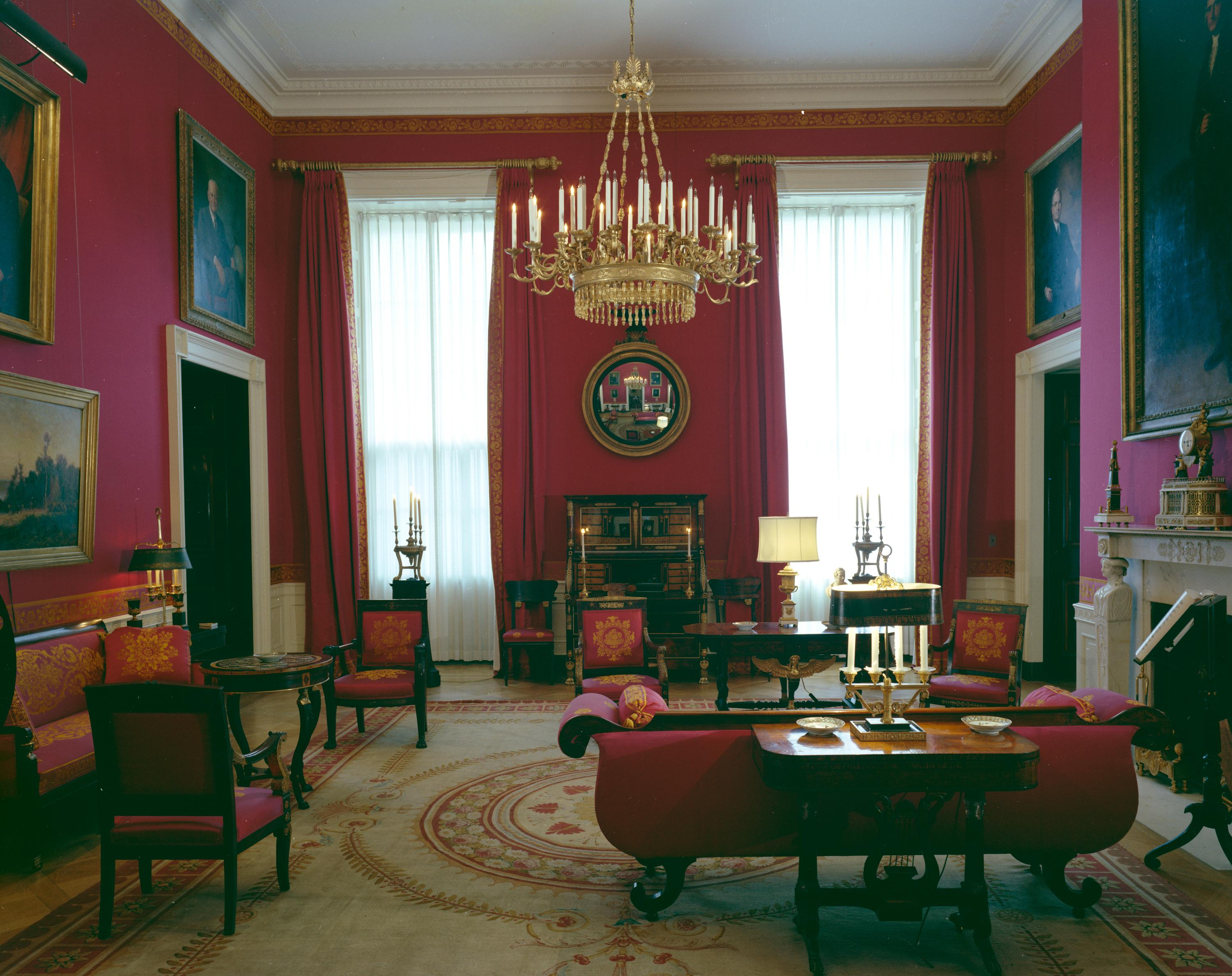
The Red Room, designed by Stéphane Boudin during the Kennedy administration

Jacqueline Kennedy, wife of President John F. Kennedy (1961–63), directed a very extensive and historic redecoration of the house. She enlisted the help of Henry Francis du Pont of the Winterthur Museum to assist in collecting artifacts for the mansion, many of which had once been housed there. Other antiques, fine paintings, and improvements from the Kennedy period were donated to the White House by wealthy philanthropists, including the Crowninshield family, Jane Engelhard, Jayne Wrightsman, and the Oppenheimer family.

Stéphane Boudin of the House of Jansen, a Paris interior-design firm that had been recognized worldwide, was employed by Jacqueline Kennedy to assist with the decoration. Different periods of the early republic and world history were selected as a theme for each room: the Federal style for the Green Room, French Empire for the Blue Room, American Empire for the Red Room, Louis XVI for the Yellow Oval Room, and Victorian for the president's study, renamed the Treaty Room. Antique furniture was acquired, and decorative fabric and trim based on period documents was produced and installed.

The Kennedy restoration resulted in a more authentic White House of grander stature, which recalled the French taste of Madison and Monroe. In the Diplomatic Reception Room, Mrs. Kennedy installed an antique "Vue de l'Amérique Nord" wallpaper which Zuber & Cie had designed in 1834. The wallpaper had hung previously on the walls of another mansion until 1961 when that house was demolished for a grocery store. Just before the demolition, the wallpaper was salvaged and sold to the White House.

The first White House guidebook was produced under the direction of curator Lorraine Waxman Pearce with direct supervision from Mrs. Kennedy. Sales of the guidebook helped finance the restoration.

In a televised tour of the house on Valentine's Day in 1962, Kennedy showed her restoration of the White House to the public.

== The White House since the Kennedy restoration ==
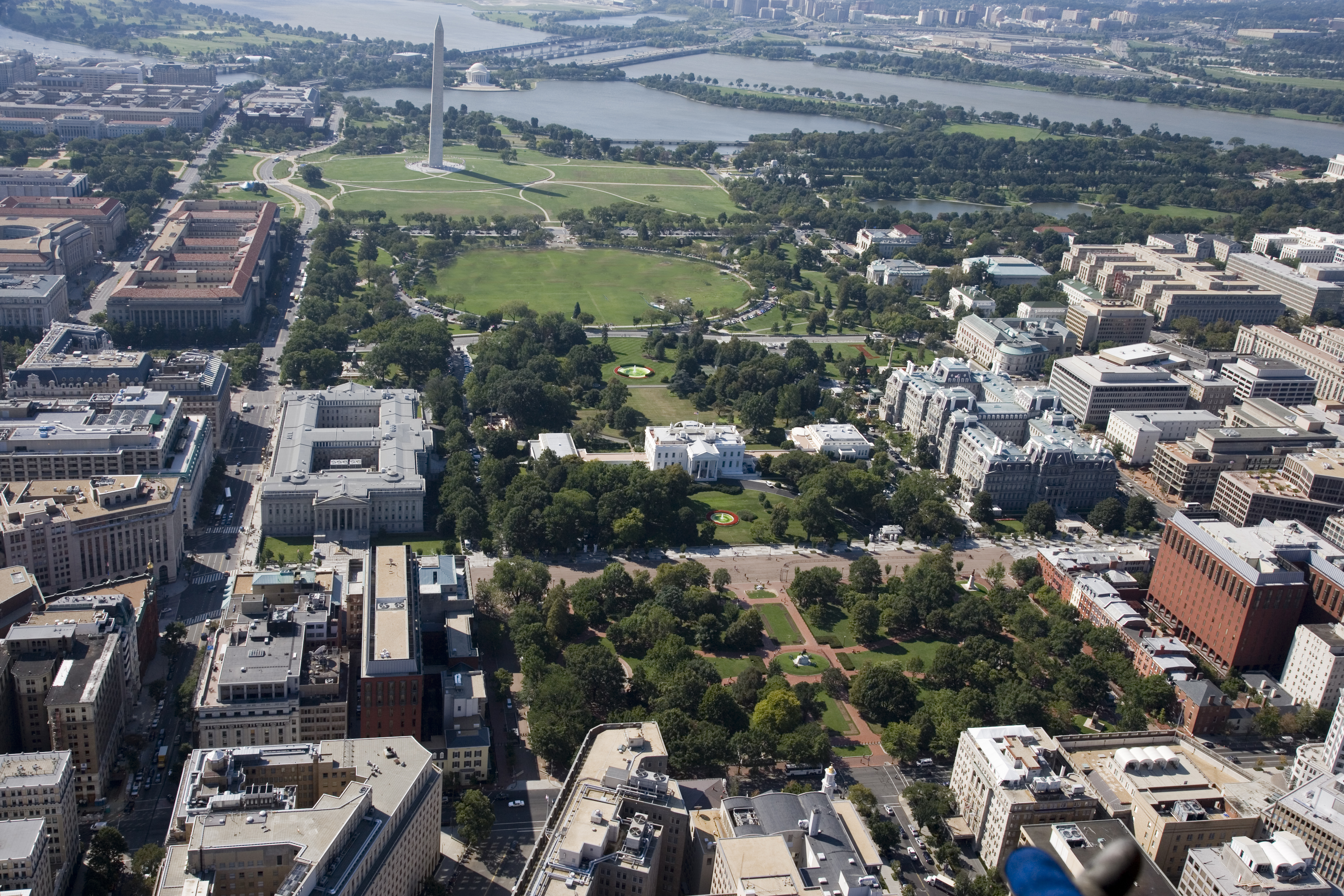
The White House complex and vicinity in 2006, viewed from the north with the Potomac River, Jefferson Memorial, and Washington Monument visible to the south

Congress enacted legislation in September 1961 declaring the White House a museum. Furniture, fixtures, and decorative arts could now be declared either historic or of artistic interest by the president. This prevented them from being sold (as many objects in the executive mansion had been in the past 150 years). When not in use or display at the White House, these items were to be turned over to the Smithsonian Institution for preservation, study, storage, or exhibition. The White House retains the right to have these items returned.

Out of respect for its historic character, no substantive architectural changes have been made to the Executive Residence since the Truman renovation. Since the Kennedy restoration, every presidential family has made some changes to the residence's private quarters, but the Committee for the Preservation of the White House must approve any modifications to the State Rooms. Charged with maintaining the house's historical integrity, the congressionally authorized committee works with each First Family – usually represented by the first lady, the White House curator, and the chief usher – to implement the family's proposals for altering the house.

During the Nixon Administration (1969–1974), First Lady Pat Nixon refurbished the Green Room, Blue Room, and Red Room, working with Clement Conger, the curator appointed by President Richard Nixon. Mrs. Nixon's efforts brought more than 600 artifacts to the house, the largest acquisition by any administration. Her husband created the modern press briefing room over Franklin Roosevelt's old swimming pool. Nixon also added a single-lane bowling alley to the White House basement.

Computers and the house's first laser printer were added during the Carter administration, and the use of computer technology was expanded during the Reagan administration. A Carter-era innovation, a set of solar water heating panels that were mounted on the roof of the White House, was removed during Reagan's presidency. Redecorations were made to the private family quarters and maintenance was made to public areas during the Reagan years. The house was accredited as a museum in 1988.

In the 1990s, Bill and Hillary Clinton refurbished some rooms with the assistance of Arkansas decorator Kaki Hockersmith, including the Oval Office, the East Room, Blue Room, State Dining Room, Lincoln Bedroom, and Lincoln Sitting Room. During the administration of George W. Bush, First Lady Laura Bush refurbished the Lincoln Bedroom in a style contemporary with the Lincoln era; the Green Room, Cabinet Room, and theater were also refurbished.

The White House became one of the first wheelchair-accessible government buildings in Washington, D.C., when modifications were made during the presidency of Franklin D. Roosevelt, who used a wheelchair because of his paralytic illness. In the 1990s, Hillary Clinton, at the suggestion of the Visitors Office director, approved the addition of a ramp in the East Wing corridor, affording easier wheelchair access for the public tours and special events that enter through the secure entrance building on the east side.

In 2003, the Bush administration reinstalled solar thermal heaters. These units are used to heat water for landscape maintenance personnel and for the presidential pool and spa. One hundred sixty-seven solar photovoltaic grid-tied panels were installed at the same time on the roof of the maintenance facility. The changes were not publicized as a White House spokeswoman said the changes were an internal matter, but the story was covered by industry trade journals.

In 2013, President Barack Obama had a set of solar panels installed on the roof of the White House, marking the first time solar power was used for the president's living quarters. He also oversaw the secretive installation of a new bunker intended to replace the World War II-era PEOC during the White House Big Dig. Located more than 60 feet (18 m) underground and built into the bedrock, the bunker was accessible via a private elevator and designed to withstand a nuclear blast, had its own separate airflow system and contained provisions for a group to survive inside for months.

During President Donald Trump's first term, First Lady Melania Trump renovated the Queens' Bedroom and preserved the East Room floor, State Entrance and Hall marble floors, White House Bowling Alley, President's Elevator, and the historic Zuber wall covering in the President's Dining Room.

In 2025, President Trump had the East Wing demolished and its surrounding grounds cleared for the construction of a new East Wing containing a state ballroom above a new PEOC military complex. He also had the bathroom of the Lincoln Bedroom renovated. In 2026, the North Portico's façade was repaired and restored.

=== Layout and amenities ===
The current group of buildings housing the presidency is known as the White House Complex.

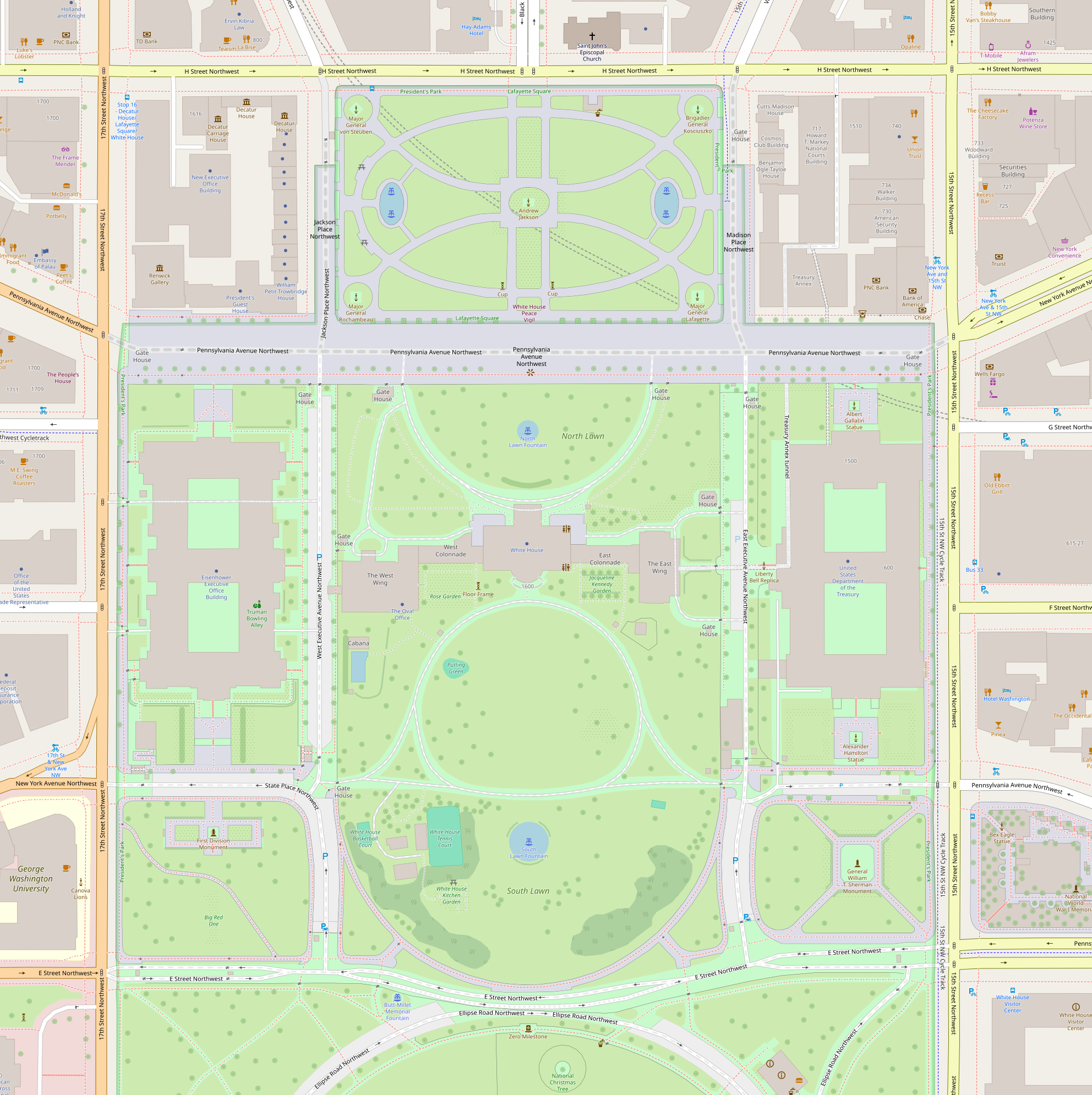
Layout of entire site

White House Complex since 2025

West Wing

Ground floor

State floor

Second floor (residence)

Area of planned new East Wing to be completed in 2028

=== Executive Residence ===
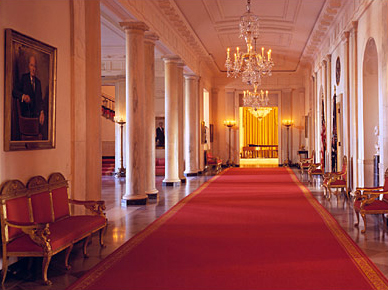
Cross Hall, which connects the State Dining Room and the East Room on the State Floor

The original residence is in the center, including six stories and 55,000 square feet (5,100 m^{2}) of floor space. Two colonnades – one on the east and one on the west – designed by Jefferson, were added later to connect the East and West Wings to the residence. The Executive Residence houses the president's dwelling, as well as rooms for ceremonies and official entertaining. It has 132 rooms, 35 bathrooms, 412 doors, 147 windows, 28 fireplaces, eight staircases, three elevators, and five full-time chefs.

The State Floor of the residence building includes the East Room, Green Room, Blue Room, Red Room, State Dining Room, Family Dining Room, Cross Hall, Entrance Hall, and Grand Staircase. The Ground Floor is made up of the Diplomatic Reception Room, Map Room, China Room, Vermeil Room, Library, the main kitchen, and other offices.

The second floor family residence includes the Yellow Oval Room, East and West Sitting Halls, the White House Master Bedroom, President's Dining Room, the Treaty Room, Lincoln Bedroom and Queens' Bedroom, as well as two additional bedrooms, a smaller kitchen, and a private dressing room. The third floor consists of the White House Solarium, Game Room, Linen Room, a Diet Kitchen, and another sitting room (previously used as President George W. Bush's workout room).

=== West Wing ===
The West Wing houses the president's office (the Oval Office) and offices of his senior staff, with room for about 50 employees. It includes the Cabinet Room, where the president conducts business meetings and where the Cabinet meets, as well as the White House Situation Room, James S. Brady Press Briefing Room, the Roosevelt Room, and a swimming pool. In 2007, work was completed on renovations of the press briefing room, adding fiber optic cables and LCD screens for the display of charts and graphs. The makeover took 11 months and cost of $8 million, of which news outlets paid $2 million. In 2010, a two-year project began on the West Wing, creating a multistory underground structure. The Oval Office, Outer Oval Office, and Cabinet Room have been a national monument since 2026.

Some members of the president's staff are located in the adjacent Eisenhower Executive Office Building, which was, until 1999, called the Old Executive Office Building and was historically the State, War, and Navy building.

The Oval Office, Roosevelt Room, and other portions of the West Wing were partially replicated on a sound stage and used as the setting for The West Wing television show.

=== East Wing ===
An interpretation of the White House with the under-construction new East Wing

The East Wing was first built in 1902 as a guest entrance. It was heavily renovated in 1942 to add a second floor, which concealed the construction of an underground bunker, the Presidential Emergency Operations Center (PEOC).

Among its uses, the East Wing intermittently housed the offices and staff of the first lady and the White House Social Office. In 1977, Rosalynn Carter became the first to place her personal office in the East Wing and to formally call it the "Office of the First Lady".

In July 2025, the Trump administration announced plans for a ballroom to be added to the existing East Wing. However, the administration later decided to replace the original East Wing with a new, much larger structure, featuring the ballroom, rebuilt colonnade and offices for the first lady built upon a secure underground PEOC and military complex slated to open in September 2028. The original East Wing and the adjacent grounds, including the Jacqueline Kennedy Garden location, were razed in October 2025 for the construction site.

As of February 2026, the project is projected to cost $400 million. The construction of the ballroom is completely funded by private donations, although by June 2026 federal funds totaling at least $352 million had been diverted to the new military complex.

=== Grounds ===
The White House and grounds cover just over eighteen acres (7.3 ha). Before the construction of the North Portico, most public events were entered from the South Lawn whose grading and landscaping was ordered by Thomas Jefferson. He also drafted landscaping for the North Lawn that included large trees that would mostly obscure the view of the house from Pennsylvania Avenue. During the mid-to-late 19th century a series of ever larger greenhouses were built on the west side of the house, where the current West Wing is located. During this period, the North Lawn was planted with ornate carpet-style flowerbeds.

The general layout of the White House grounds today is based on the 1935 design by Frederick Law Olmsted Jr. of the Olmsted Brothers firm, commissioned by President Franklin D. Roosevelt. During the Kennedy administration, the White House Rose Garden was redesigned by Rachel Lambert Mellon. The Rose Garden borders the West Colonnade. Bordering the original East Colonnade was the original Jacqueline Kennedy Garden, which was begun by Jacqueline Kennedy but completed after her husband's assassination. The Jacqueline Kennedy Garden was cleared as part of the original East Wing's demolition, but is being restored as part of the new East Wing's construction. The White House grounds also include a tennis court, a jogging track, and a putting green.

On the weekend of June 23, 2006, a century-old American elm (Ulmus americana L.) tree on the north side of the building came down during one of the many storms amid intense flooding. Among the oldest trees on the grounds are several magnolias (Magnolia grandiflora) planted by Andrew Jackson, including the Jackson magnolia, reportedly grown from a sprout taken from the favorite tree of Jackson's recently deceased wife, the sprout planted after Jackson moved into the White House. The tree stood for over 200 years. In 2017, having become too weak to stand on its own, it was decided it should be removed and replaced with one of its offspring.

Michelle Obama planted the White House's first organic garden and moved two beehives to the South Lawn after White House Carpenter Charlie Brandt began beekeeping as a hobby on the complex a few years prior. The organic produce and honey is used in food preparation for the First Family, state dinners, and gatherings, while serving as official gifts. In 2026, Melania Trump installed an artisan-crafted Executive Residence-shaped beehive on the South Lawn.

During Donald Trump's first term, Melania Trump oversaw the design and construction of the White House Tennis Pavilion and renovated the Rose Garden. In 2025, President Trump initiated the installation of a pair of 88-foot (27 m) flagpoles on the North and South Lawns and a granite patio replacing the Rose Garden lawn.

In 2026, a temporary 5,000-seat arena was erected on the South Lawn for UFC Freedom 250, the only professional sporting event to be held on White House grounds. After the arena was dismantled, a granite helipad, designed with the presidential seal, was constructed in its place to accommodate the new Sikorsky VH-92 Patriot Marine One, whose powerful rotor wash uprooted grass and created hazardous debris. Previously, helicopters landed on three metal disks manually placed on the South Lawn.

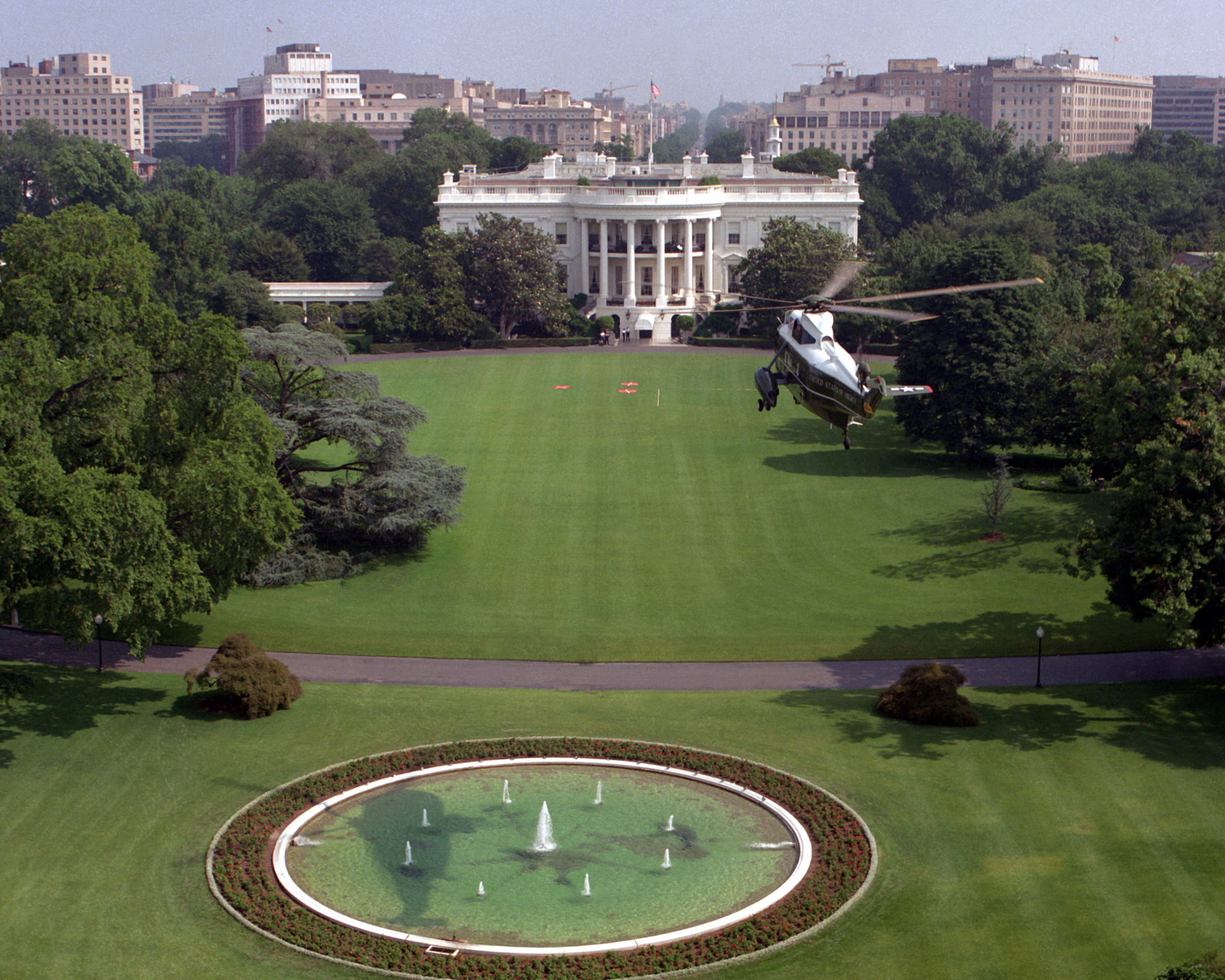
Marine One prepares to land on South Lawn where State Arrival Ceremonies are held

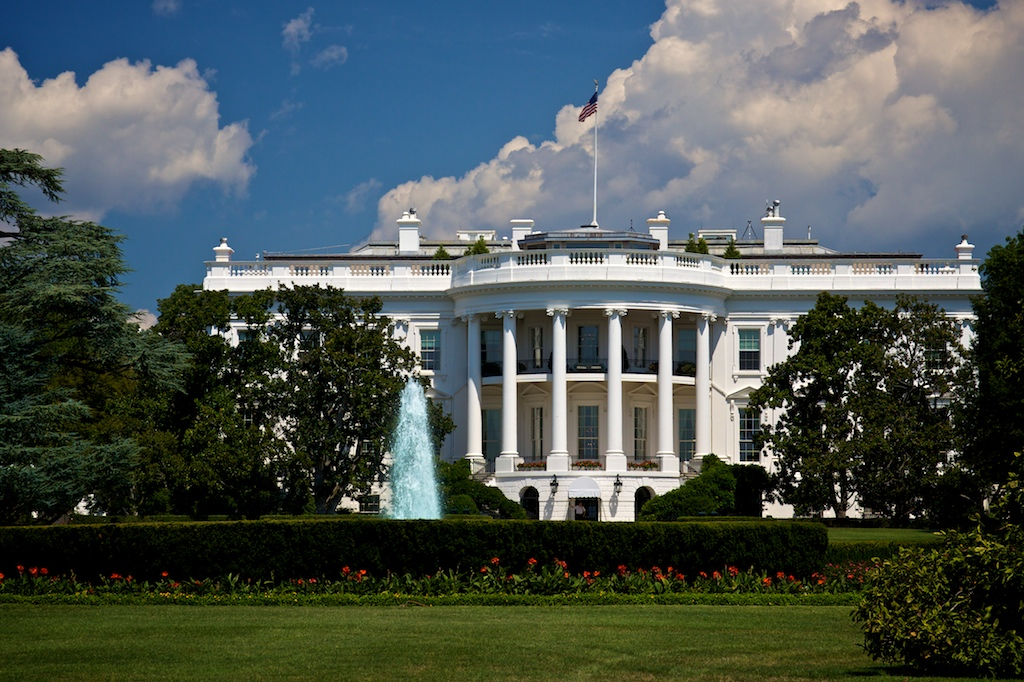
A view from the south, with the south fountain

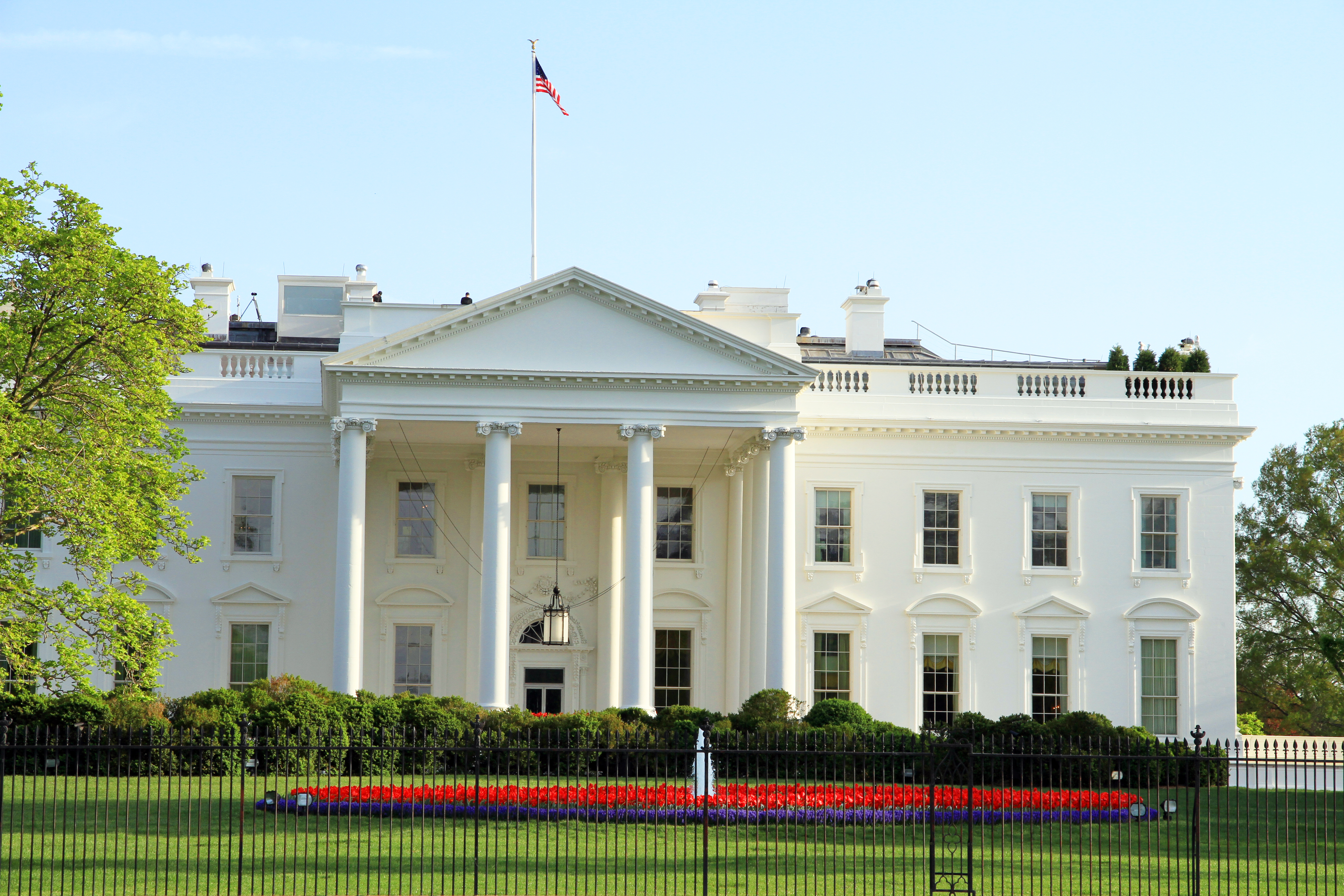
A view from the north, with the north fountain

Artisan beehive on South Lawn

Marine One initial takeoff from White House Helipad

== Public access and security ==
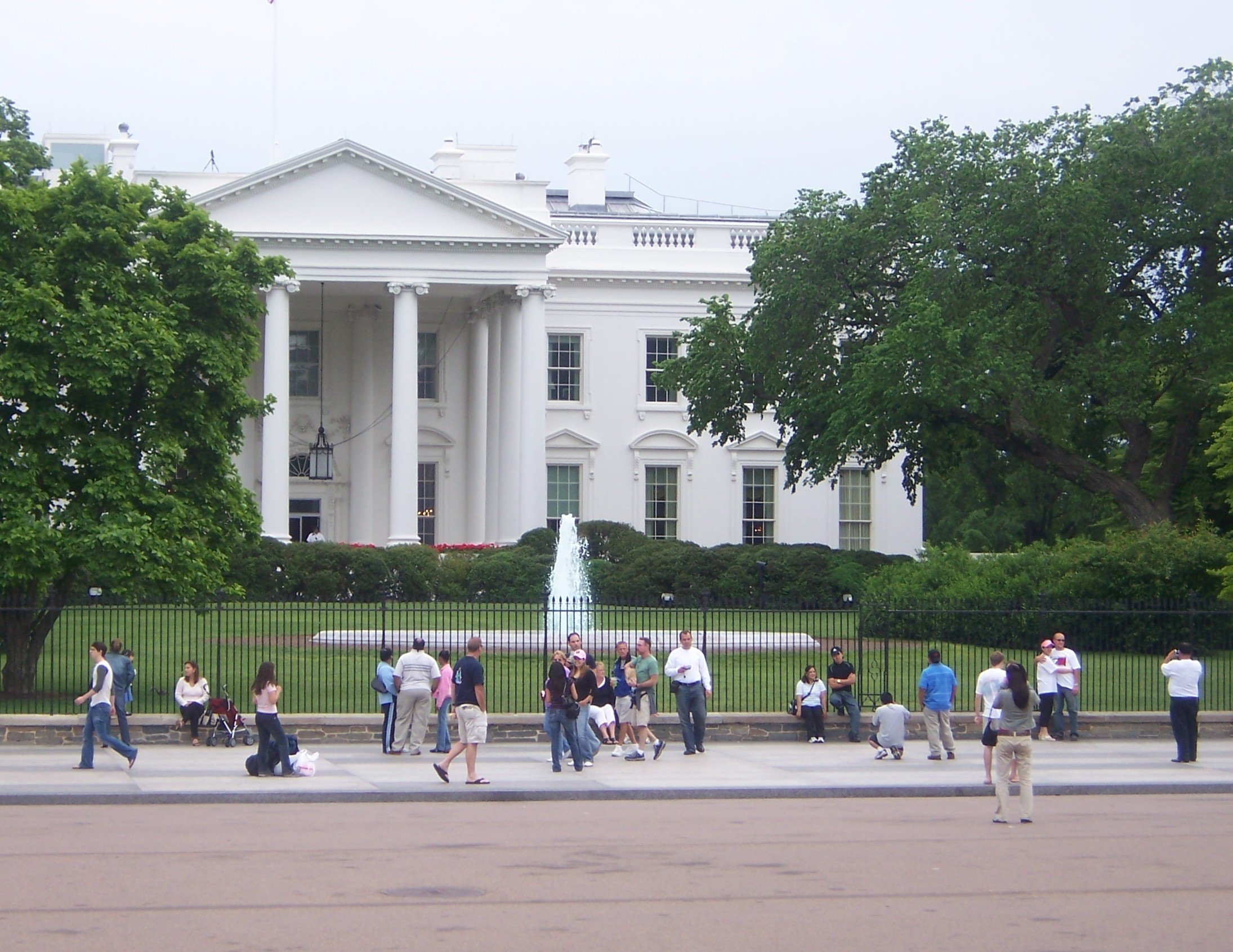
For security reasons, the section of Pennsylvania Avenue on the north side of the White House is closed to all vehicular traffic except that of government officials.

The White House receives up to 30,000 visitors each week. The chief usher coordinates day to day household operations.

=== Historical accessibility ===
Like the English and Irish country houses it was modeled on, the White House was, from the start, open to the public until the early part of the 20th century.

Inspired by Washington's open houses in New York and Philadelphia, John Adams began the tradition of the White House New Year's Reception. Thomas Jefferson permitted public tours of his house, which have continued ever since, except during wartime, and began the tradition of an annual reception on the Fourth of July.

President Jefferson held an open house for his second inaugural in 1805, and many of the people at his swearing-in ceremony at the Capitol followed him home, where he greeted them in the Blue Room. Those open houses sometimes became rowdy: in 1829, President Andrew Jackson had to leave for a hotel when roughly 20,000 people celebrated his inauguration inside the White House. His aides ultimately had to lure the mob outside with washtubs filled with a potent cocktail of orange juice and whiskey. The practice continued until 1885, when newly elected Grover Cleveland arranged for a presidential review of the troops from a grandstand in front of the White House instead of the traditional open house.

Those receptions ended in the early 1930s. President Bill Clinton briefly revived the New Year's Day open house in his first term.

=== Aviation incidents ===
In February 1974, a stolen U.S. Army helicopter landed without authorization on the White House's grounds. Twenty years later, in 1994, a stolen light plane flown by Frank Eugene Corder crashed on White House grounds, instantly killing him.

During the September 11 attacks, shortly after notice of the plane impacts, the White House staff and other occupants were ordered to evacuate by the U.S. Secret Service after a call was made to them from Ronald Reagan Washington National Airport air traffic control staff, stating, "There is an aircraft coming at you," though an aircraft never did show up.

On May 12, 2005, as a result of increased security regarding air traffic in the capital, the White House was evacuated after an unauthorized aircraft approached the grounds. After being forced to land by two F-16 fighter jets and a Black Hawk helicopter at a small airport nearby, the pilot was identified to be a student pilot who accidentally breached White House grounds without knowledge.

On January 27, 2015, at 3 a.m. an intoxicated man flew a quadcopter drone from his apartment near the White House but lost control of it, prompting it to crash on the southeast side on White House grounds. The White House was temporarily locked down by the Secret Service shortly after an officer reported witnessing "[a] drone flying at a low altitude." Investigators suspected that the drone accidentally flew and breached into the property because of either wind or trees.

In June 2023, fighter jets moved to intercept a light aircraft that violated Washington DC airspace near the White House, before it crashed in Virginia. All occupants in the intrusion aircraft were killed.

=== Closure of Pennsylvania Avenue ===
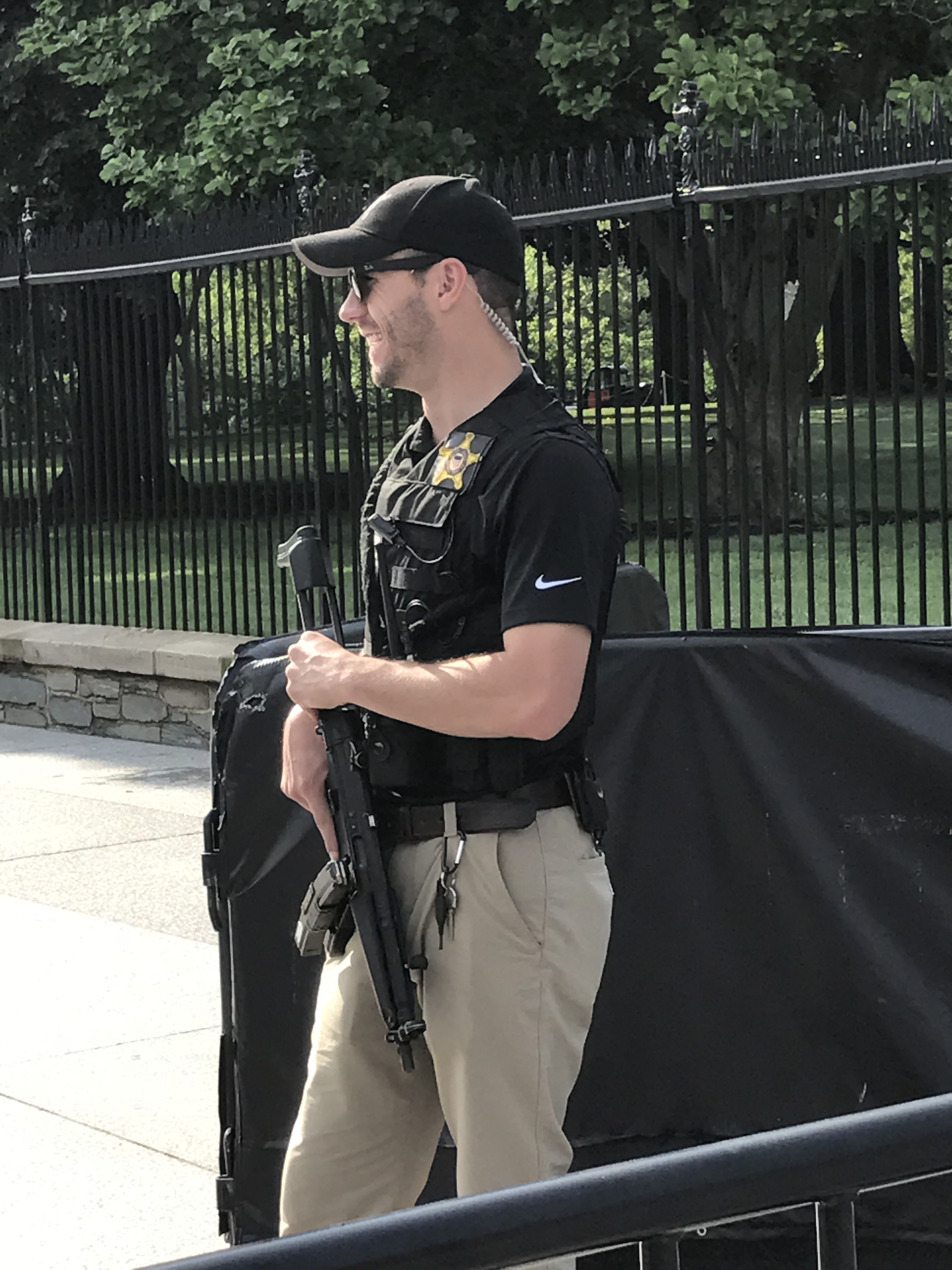
A uniformed U.S. Secret Service agent on Pennsylvania Avenue

On May 20, 1995, primarily as a response to the Oklahoma City bombing of April 19, 1995, the United States Secret Service closed off Pennsylvania Avenue to vehicular traffic in front of the White House, from the eastern edge of Lafayette Park to 17th Street. Later, the closure was extended an additional block to the east to 15th Street, and East Executive Avenue, a small street between the White House and the Treasury Building.

After September 11, 2001, this change was made permanent, in addition to closing E Street between the South Portico of the White House and the Ellipse. In response to the Boston Marathon bombing, the road was closed to the public in its entirety for a period of two days.

The Pennsylvania Avenue closure has been opposed by organized civic groups in Washington, D.C. They argue that the closing impedes traffic flow unnecessarily and is inconsistent with the well-conceived historic plan for the city. As for security considerations, they note that the White House is set much farther back from the street than numerous other sensitive federal buildings are.

Prior to its inclusion within the fenced compound that now includes the Eisenhower Executive Office Building to the west and the Treasury Building to the east, this sidewalk served as a queuing area for the daily public tours of the White House. These tours were suspended in the wake of the September 11 attacks. In September 2003, they resumed on a limited basis for groups making prior arrangements through their Congressional representatives or embassies in Washington for foreign nationals and submitting to background checks, but the White House remained closed to the public. Due to budget constraints, White House tours were suspended for most of 2013 due to sequestration. The White House reopened to the public in November 2013.

=== Protection ===
The White House Complex is protected by the United States Secret Service and the United States Park Police.

During the 2005 presidential inauguration, NASAMS (Norwegian Advanced Surface-to-Air Missile System) units were used to patrol the airspace over Washington, D.C. The same units have since been used to protect the president and all airspace around the White House, which is strictly prohibited to aircraft.

== Births, deaths and weddings at the White House ==
=== Births ===
Eighteen children have been born at the White House, including Grover Cleveland's daughter Esther.

Other children born at the White House:

- James Madison Randolph, grandson of Thomas Jefferson
- Asnet Hughes, son of Ursula Granger and Wormley Hughes, enslaved people owned by Jefferson
- Two children of Frances Hern and David Hern, enslaved people owned by Jefferson
- The Fossett children, four children born to Fanny Fossett and Edith Fossett, enslaved women owned by Jefferson
- Mary Louisa Adams, granddaughter of John Quincy Adams
- Mary Emily, John Samuel, and Rachel Jackson Donelson, grand-nieces and nephew of Andrew Jackson
- Rebecca Van Buren, granddaughter of Martin Van Buren
- Letitia Christian Tyler and Robert Tyler Jones, grandchildren of John Tyler
- Julia Grant Cantacuzène, granddaughter of Ulysses Grant
- Francis Bowes Sayre Jr., grandson of Woodrow Wilson

=== Deaths ===
Two presidents, William Henry Harrison and Zachary Taylor, and three first ladies, Letitia Tyler, Caroline Harrison, and Ellen Wilson, have died at the White House. Others who have died at the White House include Rebecca Van Buren, granddaughter of Martin Van Buren, and Abraham Lincoln's son, William Wallace Lincoln.

=== Weddings ===
There have been nineteen documented weddings and four separate wedding receptions at the White House. The only president to marry in the White House was Grover Cleveland, who married Frances Folsom on June 2, 1886, in the Blue Room.

The children of sitting presidents who married in the White House are Maria Hester Monroe Gouveneur (1820), John Adams II (1828), Elizabeth Tyler (1842), Nellie Grant (1874), Alice Roosevelt Longworth (1906), Jessie Wilson Sayre (1913), Eleanor Wilson McAdoo (1914), and Tricia Nixon Cox (1971). Luci Johnson (1967) and Jenna Bush Hager (2008) held their receptions at the White House.

== Gallery ==
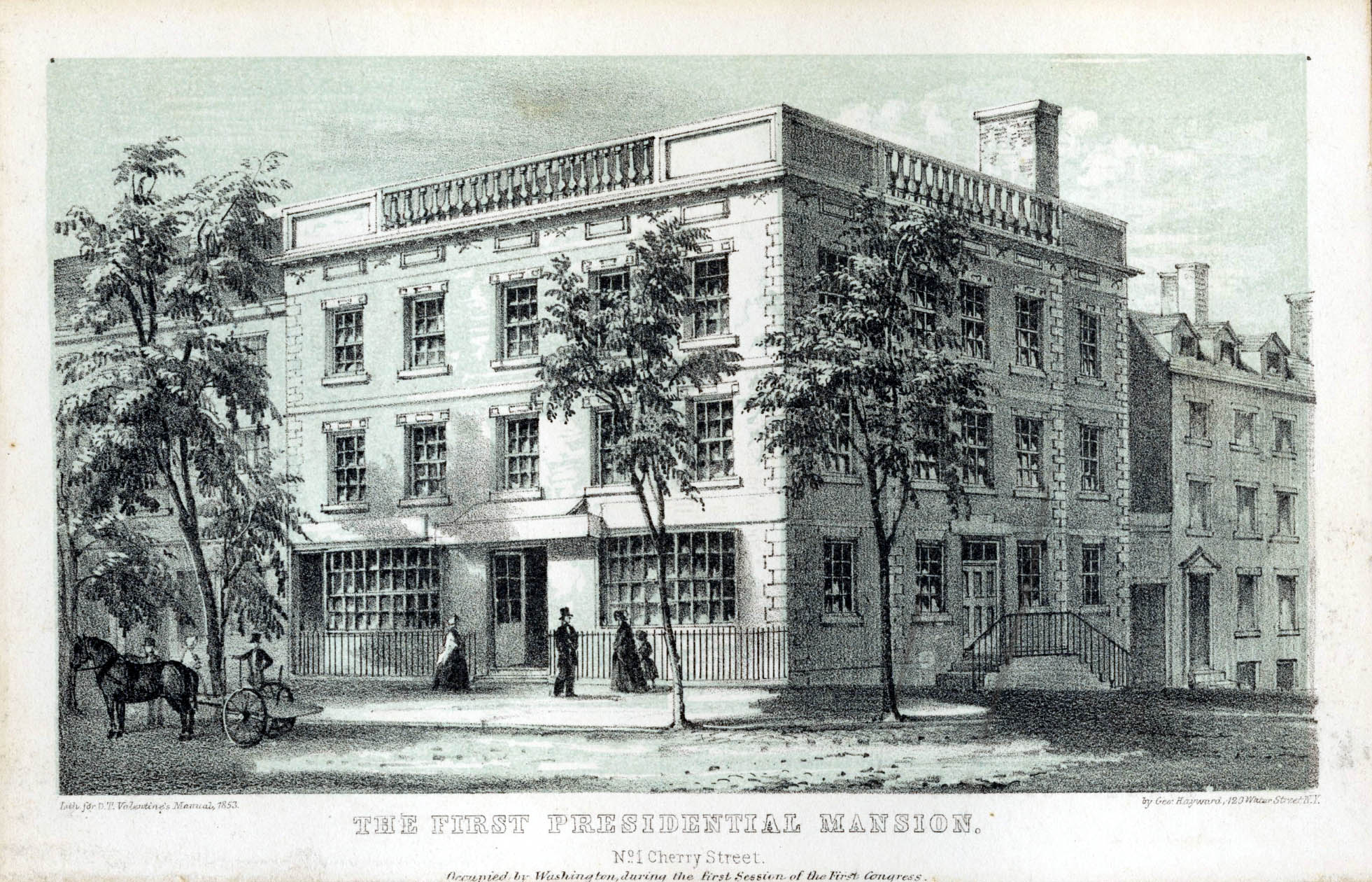
The first presidential mansion, Samuel Osgood House in Manhattan, occupied by Washington from April 1789 – February 1790

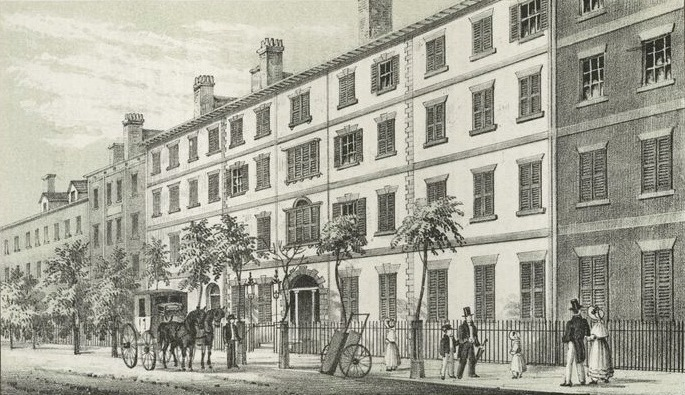
The second presidential mansion, Alexander Macomb House, in Manhattan, occupied by Washington from February–August 1790

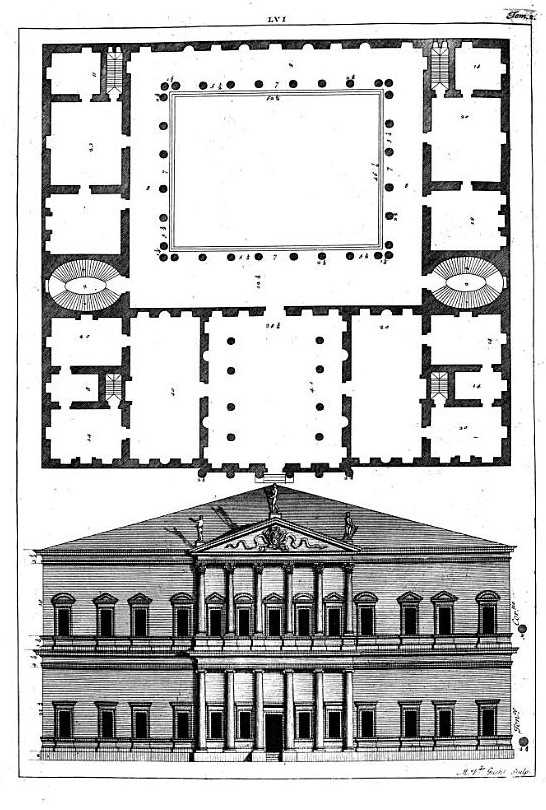
Andrea Palladio's illustration, Project for Francesco et Lodovico de Trissini, from the book I quattro libri dell'architettura, published in 1570

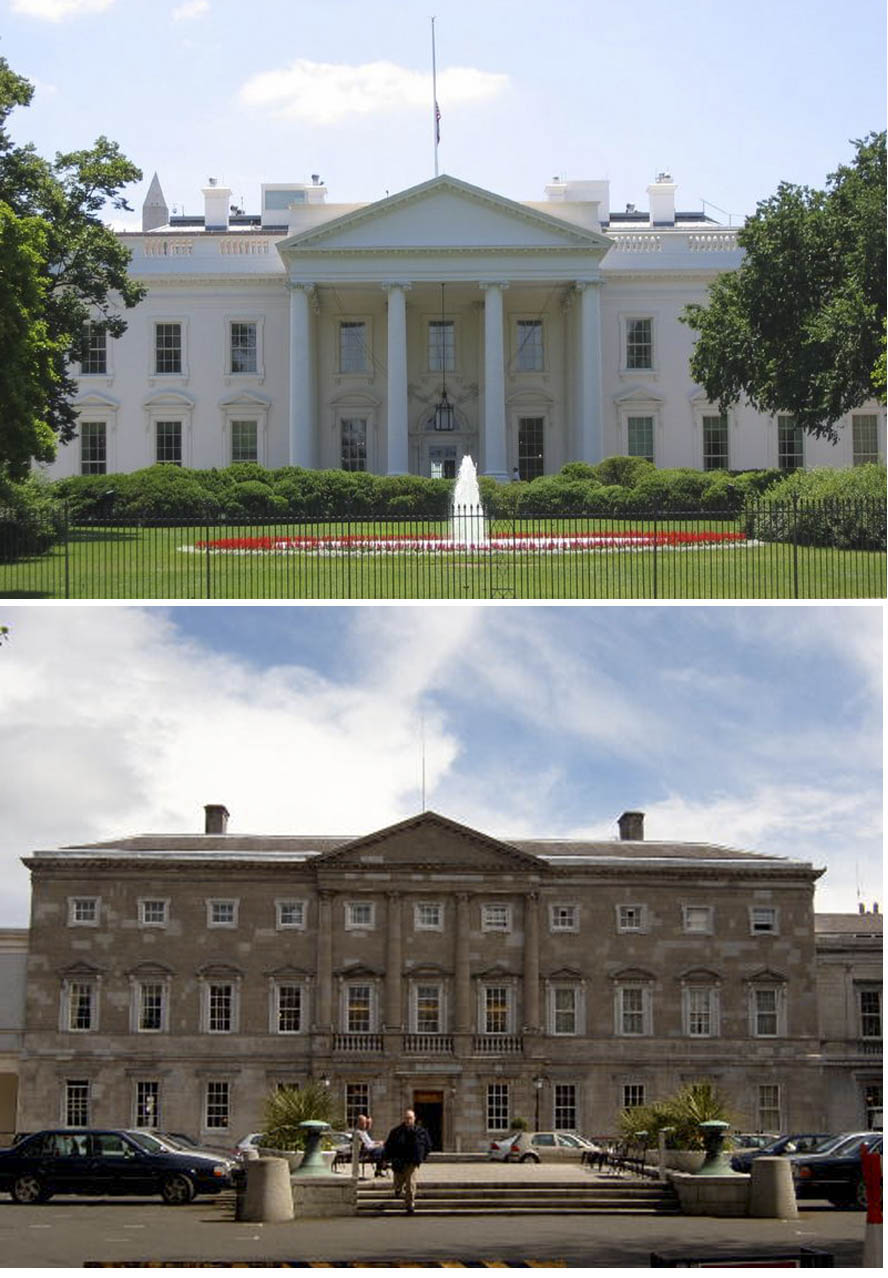
The North Portico of the White House compared to Leinster House

The Château de Rastignac compared to the South Portico of the White House, c. 1846

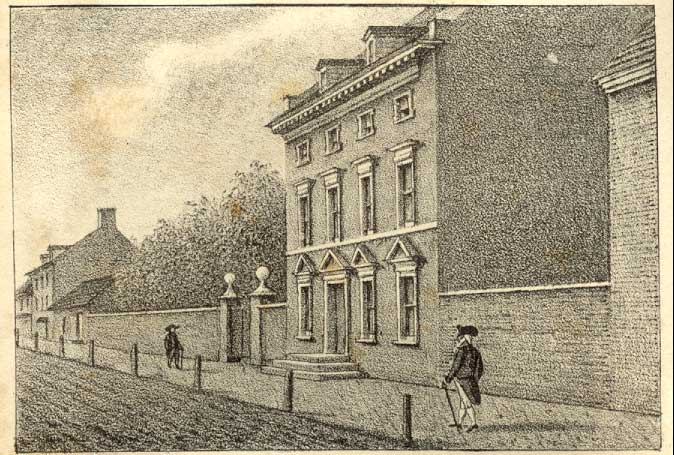
The third presidential mansion, President's House in Philadelphia, occupied by Washington from November 1790 – March 1797. Occupied by Adams: March 1797 – May 1800

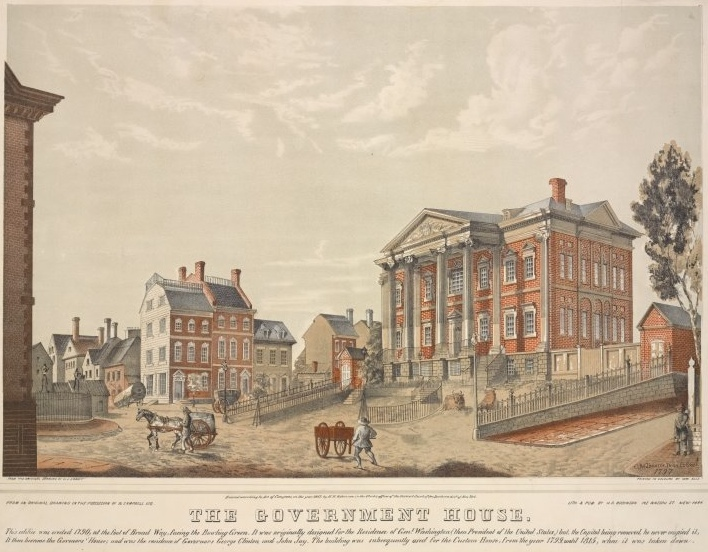
Government House in Manhattan, built in 1790–1791, was designed to be the permanent presidential mansion, but Congress moved the national capital to Philadelphia before its completion.

President's House in Philadelphia (built in the 1790s), was not used by any president after the presidential mansion, known as the White House, was moved from Philadelphia to the new national capital of Washington, D.C.

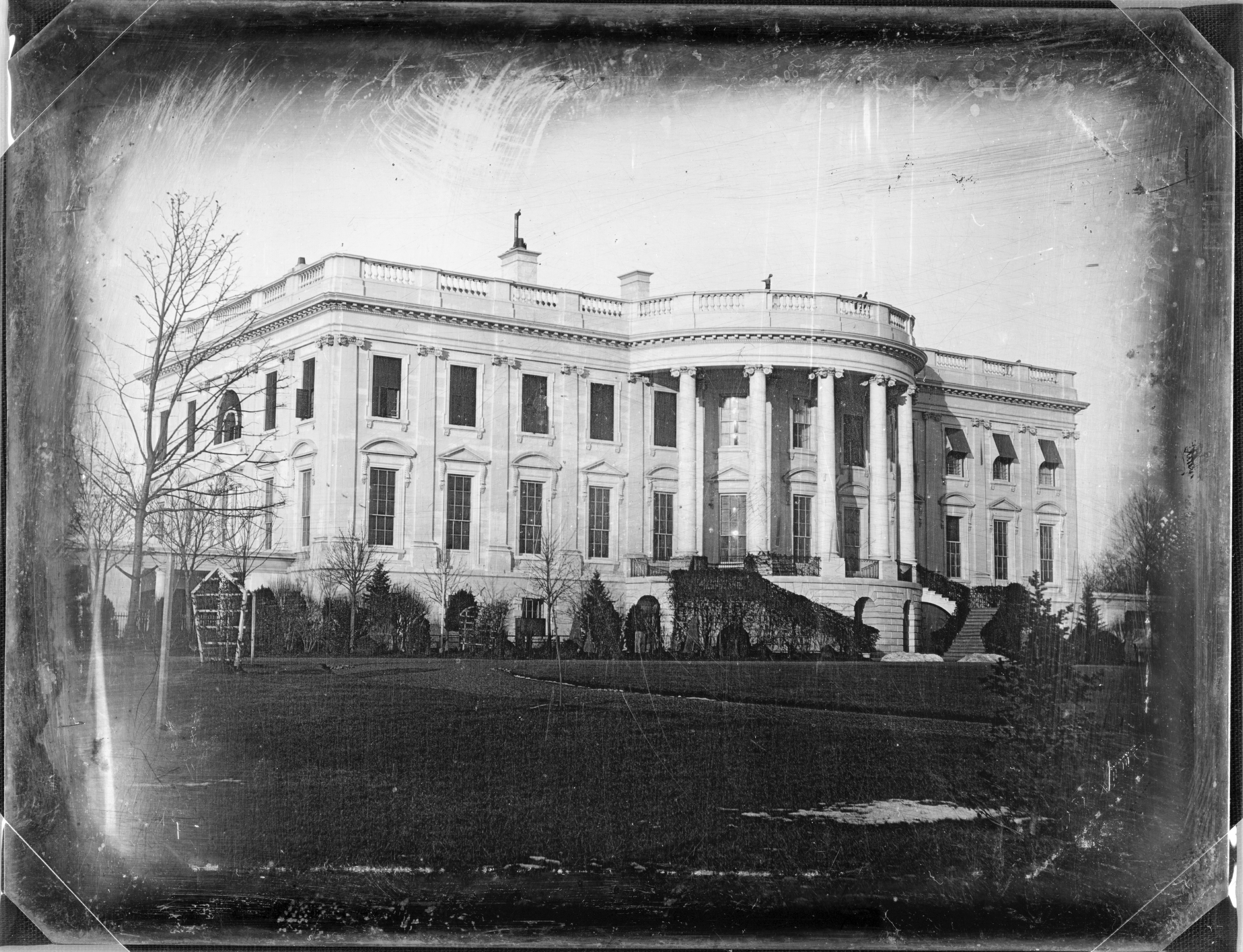
The earliest known photograph of the White House, taken c. 1846 by John Plumbe during the administration of James K. Polk

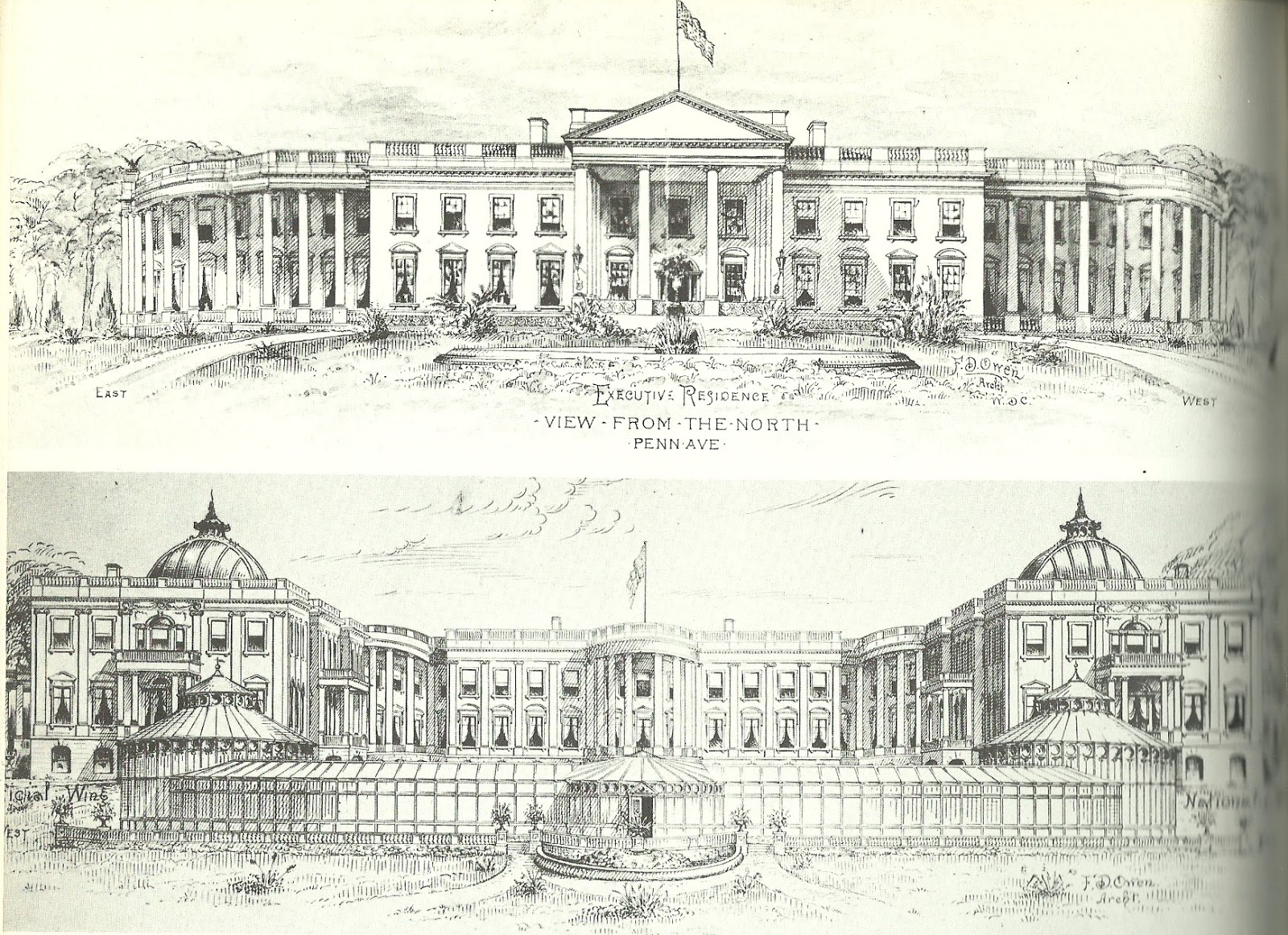
Additions proposed by architect Frederick D. Owen in 1890

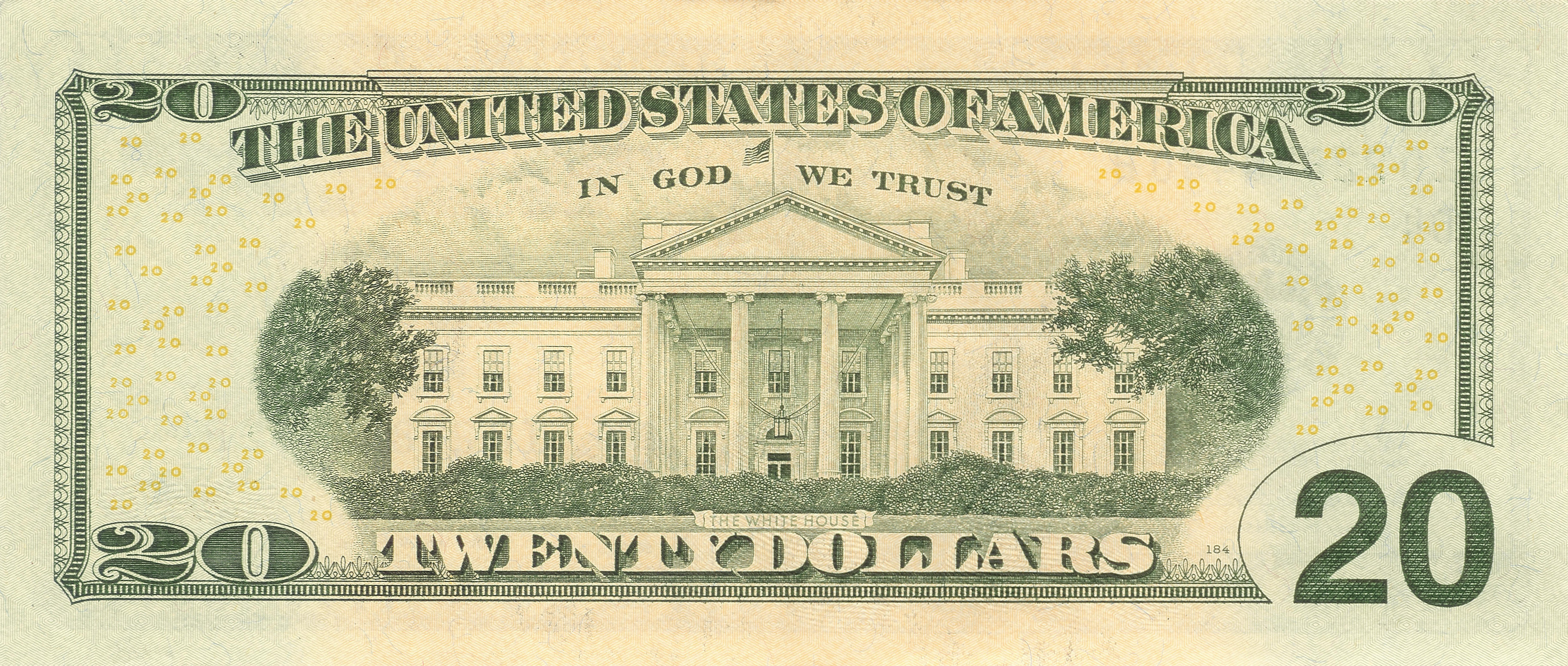
The building's north front has been on the reverse of the U.S. $20 bill since 1998; an illustration of the south side was used for 70 years prior to its issuance.

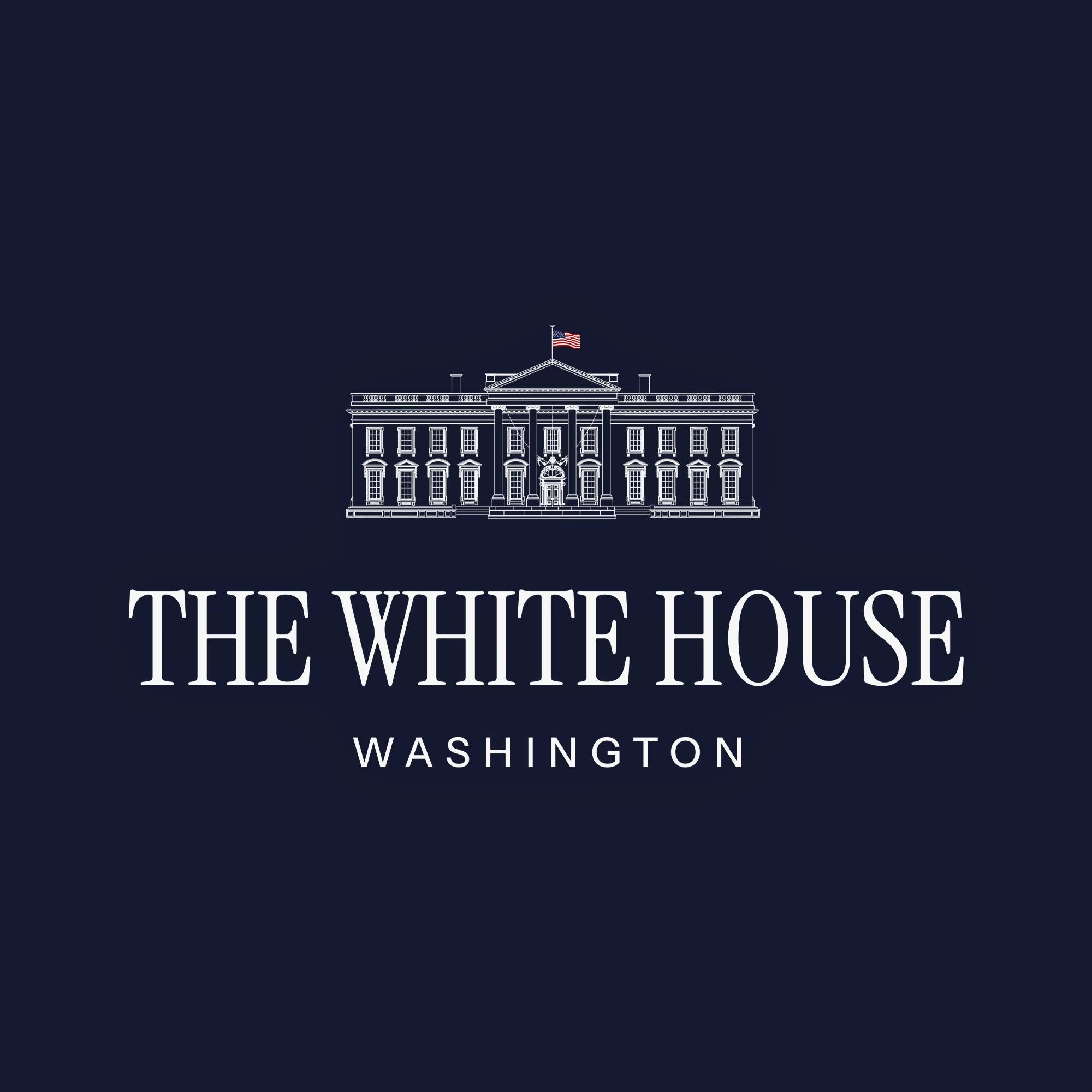
Logo of the White House under President Donald J. Trump.

== See also ==
- Architecture of Washington, D.C.
- Art in the White House
- Camp David
- Pedro Casanave
- Germantown White House
- Graphics and Calligraphy Office
- List of largest houses in the United States
- List of National Historic Landmarks in Washington, D.C.
- List of the oldest buildings in Washington, D.C.
- List of residences of presidents of the United States
- Number One Observatory Circle, residence of the vice president
- Replicas of the White House
- Reported White House ghosts
- White House Acquisition Trust
- White House Chief Calligrapher
- White House Chief Floral Designer
- White House Christmas tree
- White House Communications Agency
- White House Endowment Trust
- White House Executive Chef
- White House Fellows
- White House History
- White House Social Secretary
- Category:Individual rooms in the White House
