= Presidential Emergency Operations Center =

Bunker underneath the East Wing of the White House

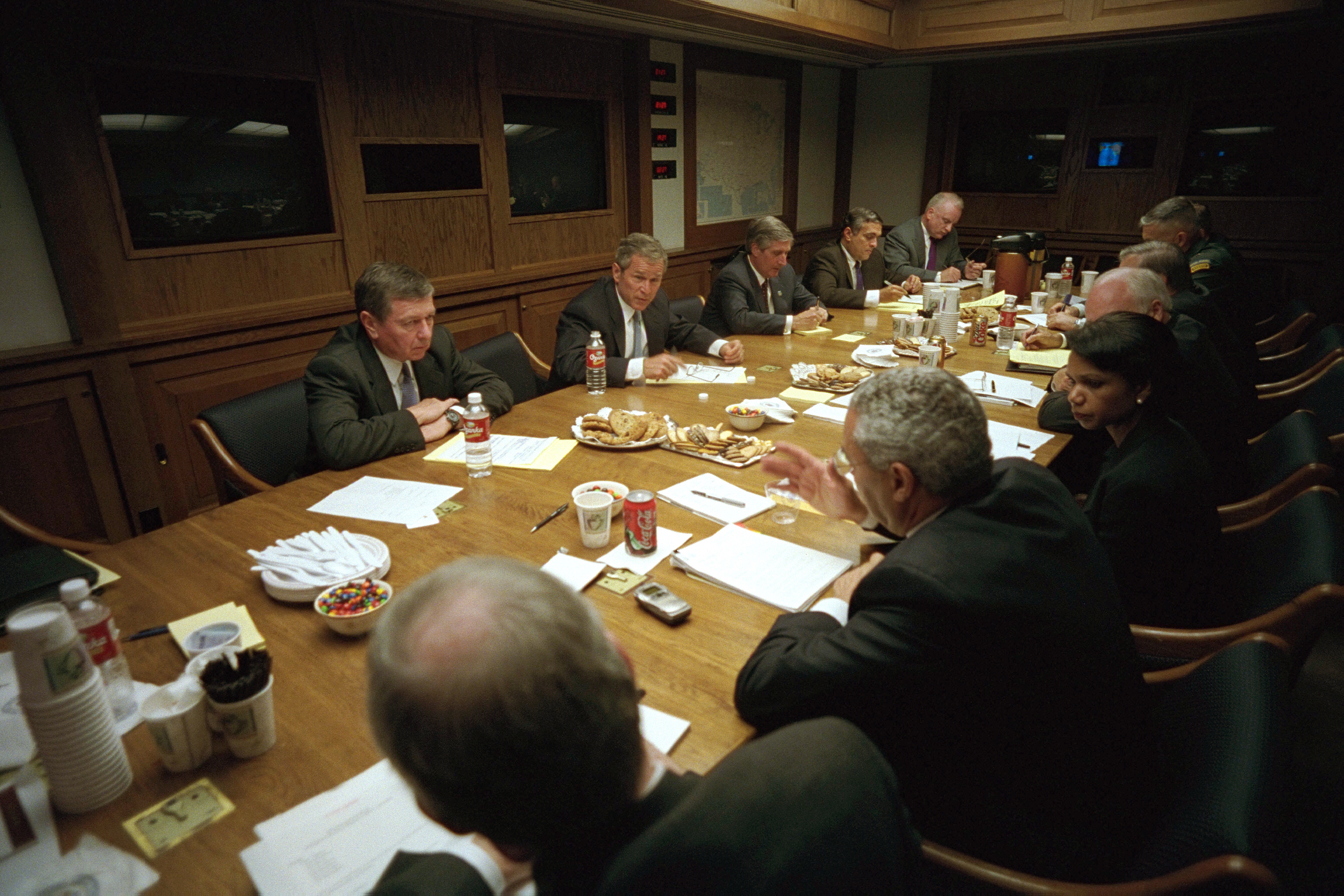
- After addressing the nation on the evening of September 11, President George W. Bush meets with the National Security Council in the Presidential Emergency Operations Center.
- Building: The White House's East Wing
- Location: Washington, D.C.
- Country: United States
- Coordinates: 38.89757°N 77.03565°W

The Presidential Emergency Operations Center (PEOC, PEE-ock) is a bunker under construction underneath the site of the East Wing of the White House complex. Initially built under the original East Wing during World War II, the PEOC served as a secure shelter and communications center for the president of the United States and others in case of emergency. The PEOC was demolished in 2025 along with the rest of the original East Wing for the construction of a new East Wing containing a state ballroom. A larger, upgraded PEOC is being constructed underneath and alongside the new East Wing.

== History ==
=== World War II ===
The original White House bunker was built in 1942 during World War II to protect President Franklin D. Roosevelt in the event of an aerial attack on Washington, D.C.. It was continually upgraded during its operational life.

The PEOC space had modern communications equipment, including televisions and phones to coordinate with outside government entities. During a breach of White House security, including violations of the Washington, D.C., Air Defense Identification Zone (P-56 airspace), the president and other protectees were to be relocated to the executive briefing room, next to the PEOC. The PEOC was staffed around the clock by joint-service military officers and non-commissioned officers.

=== September 11 attacks ===
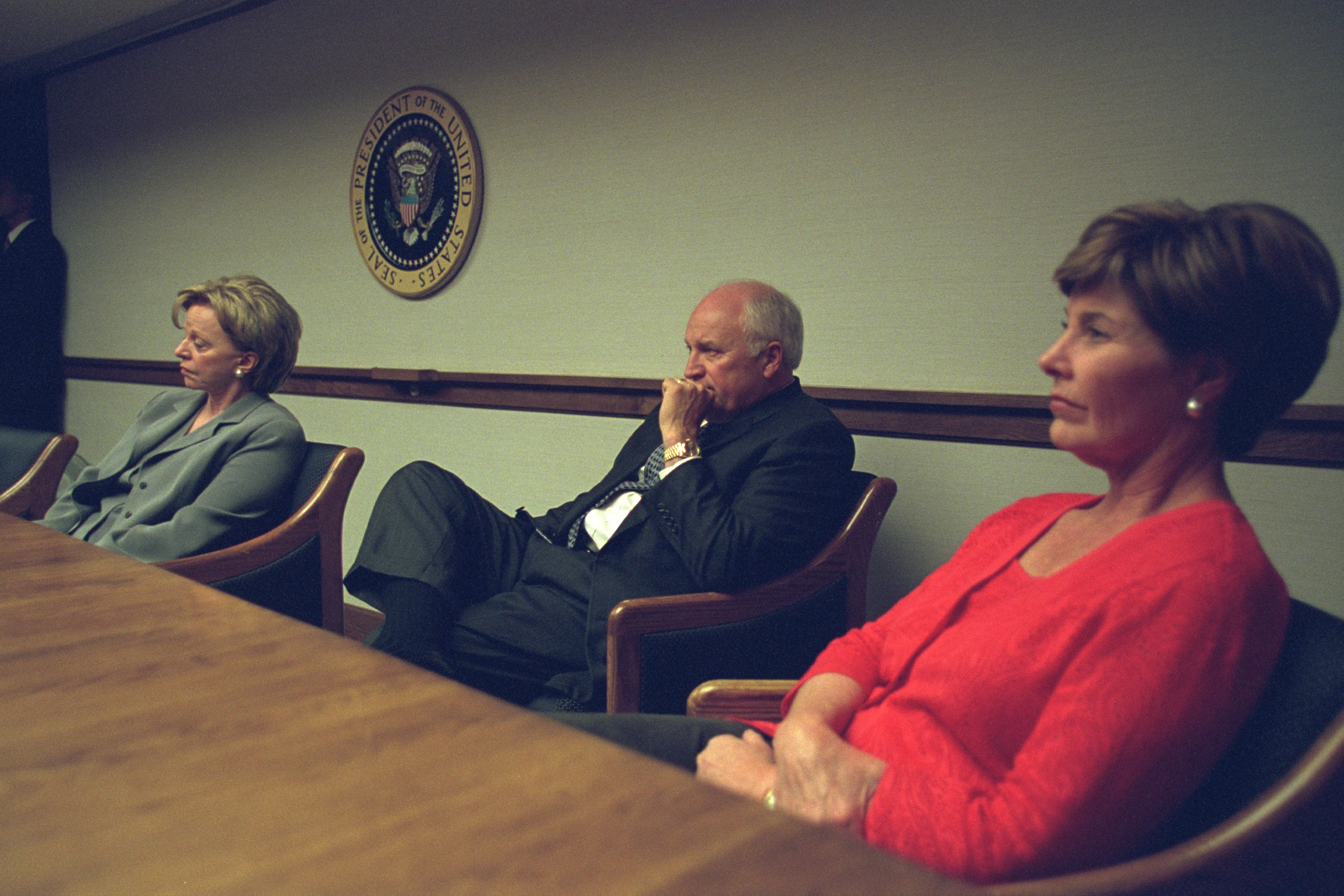
Vice President Dick Cheney, First Lady Laura Bush, and Second Lady Lynne Cheney in the Presidential Emergency Operations Center following the September 11 attacks

During the September 11 attacks, a number of key personnel were evacuated from their offices in the White House to the PEOC. These included Vice President Dick Cheney, First Lady Laura Bush, Second Lady Lynne Cheney, Condoleezza Rice, Mary Matalin, "Scooter" Libby, Joshua Bolten, Karen Hughes, Stephen Hadley, David Addington, Secret Service agents, U.S. Army major and White House Fellow Mike Fenzel, and other staff including Norman Mineta. President George W. Bush was visiting a school in Florida at the time of the attacks.

=== George Floyd protests ===
Secret Service agents rushed President Donald Trump to the PEOC during the night of May 29, 2020, at the beginning of the George Floyd protests. According to author Michael Bender, after his time in the bunker was reported in the news, Trump demanded that officials find and prosecute those responsible for the information getting to the press.

=== Demolition and rebuild ===
In October 2025, two senior administration officials told CBS News that the East Wing would be demolished and the PEOC would be rebuilt by the White House Military Office in conjunction with the White House State Ballroom construction. In January 2026, White House director of management and administration Joshua Fisher stated at the National Capital Planning Commission that the project will deliver "resilient, adaptive infrastructure aligned with future mission needs". CNN further reported that the PEOC was demolished in October 2025, along with the rest of the East Wing, to make way for a new multi-storied underground complex outfitted with state-of-the-art technology. While the PEOC technology had been upgraded throughout the decades, its infrastructure was still dated in the 1940s. In May 2026, Trump revealed that the new bunker will contain six stories, a military hospital, research facilities, and meeting rooms anchoring a secure ballroom.

As of September 2026, the East Wing renovation project continues ahead of schedule after a favorable Supreme Court 5-4 ruling.

== Post-September 11 facility ==
In August 2026, The Washington Post reported that a second presidential emergency facility was constructed under the White House between the September 11 attacks and the end of the presidency of Barack Obama. Citing two former federal officials, the Post characterized the structure as a "bunker" mined into the bedrock 60 feet (18 m) below the White House. According to the officials, it was designed as a secure continuity of government command center that can accommodate dozens of individuals for weeks if necessary, during and after attacks by weapons of mass destruction. The existence of the facility was highly classified and reportedly not even disclosed to legislators or most senior executive branch officials. Leon Panetta, who served as director of the Central Intelligence Agency and secretary of defense under Barack Obama, confirmed the existence of this newer structure when asked about it on MSNOW.

This reporting follows similar claims by Ronald Kessler in his 2018 book Changing the Rules of the Game: Inside the Trump White House, and also in later interviews. Kessler suggested that this second bunker was constructed north of the West Wing in a project known as the White House Big Dig. Other analysts have argued that the North Lawn excavation was not deep enough to match Kessler's description or reach bedrock. Instead, they argue that the deeper bunker was tunneled from a site in East Potomac Park, citing other unexplained construction projects around the White House. The White House has not clarified how the new construction at the East Wing affects this facility.
