= An Invitation to the White House =

Book by Hillary Clinton

- Author: Hillary Rodham Clinton
- Language: English
- Publisher: Simon & Schuster
- Publication date: November 14, 2000
- Media type: Hardcover
- Pages: 324
- ISBN: 0-684-85799-5
- OCLC: 44550598
- Dewey Decimal: 975.3 21
- LC Class: F204.W5 C58 2000
- Preceded by: Dear Socks, Dear Buddy: Kids' Letters to the First Pets (1998)
- Followed by: Living History (2003)

An Invitation to the White House: At Home with History is a 2000 coffee table book written by First Lady of the United States Hillary Rodham Clinton. Published by Simon & Schuster, it describes life at the White House during the Clinton administration, including the renovation and refurbishment projects that were done and the emphasis on American cuisine.

== Background and writing ==
Plans for the book were announced publicly in April 1999. A spokesperson for the publisher said that Clinton had first thought of the idea for the book a year and a half earlier.

Clinton worked on the book during the United States Senate election in New York, 2000, often writing notes or text out longhand in between campaign stops. Writer Cheryl Merser was stated to be assisting Clinton with the research and writing of the work; she met with Clinton twice during this period. The book was completed during summer 2000, but publication of it was held up until after the Senate election, to avoid the appearance that Clinton was using the book to gain an advantage with her time as First Lady. Thus the book was released shortly before the author left the White House to take her seat in the United States Senate.

== Themes of the book ==
The book is the most traditional of Clinton's publications, having less to do with politicking than with hostessing. In particular, it sought to portray the author as "a keeper of tradition". Clinton received no advance and sales proceeds for the $35 book were given to the White House Historical Association, a private, non-profit organization with a mission to enhance the public's understanding, appreciation, and enjoyment of the White House. That association also holds the book's copyright.

The book's foreword is by J. Carter Brown, former director of the National Gallery of Art. Its introduction is by historian Carl Sferrazza Anthony. Chapters of the book include ones that discuss the historical aspects of the White House, what goes on behind the scenes, how White House functions celebrate arts and culture and Americans of accomplishment, and traditions associated with the winter holidays. Much attention is given to the two-year renovation of the Blue Room. The final 90 pages of the book are devoted to various recipes of the White House Kitchens. The volume contains over 350 color and black-and-white photographs. Most were taken by various photographers of the White House Photo Office, including Ralph Alswang and Barbara Kinney, along with never-before-published family photographs. Many of the photographs of food items were taken by Romulo Yanes.

It contains a general allusion to the controversies and investigations that the Clintons were the subject of during their time in the White House. But it does not discuss any of them in particular; the only mention of the Lincoln Bedroom makes no reference to the Lincoln Bedroom for contributors controversy. Nor does it discuss Clinton's feelings or inner thoughts about being First Lady; that would have to come with her 2003 memoir Living History.

== Critical and commercial reception ==
The publisher, Simon & Schuster, undertook a publicity campaign for the book and two others on American design as part of the holiday buying season. The book's appearance also coincided with the 200th anniversary of the White House itself and several other books on that subject. A book party was held at the White House in December 2000 with over 300 guests. The book sold well, spending nine weeks on The New York Times Best Seller list for hardcover non-fiction, peaking at number five.

The photography and scheme of illustrations in the book was generally characterized as "glossy" or "lavish". Regarding its content, Marian Burros of The New York Times wrote that

At the very moment Hillary Rodham Clinton has shattered the mold of First Lady by winning a Senate seat, she is also celebrating the traditional side of her life for the last eight years, as chatelaine of the Executive Mansion. ... she makes a case that a policy wonk can also pour her energies into the entertaining and 'cookie baking' side of being First Lady.

Lawrence L. Knutson of the Associated Press wrote that "The closest that the book comes to political or policy debate is a description of the intense inner-circle deliberations on choosing the right shade of deep sapphire blue for the Blue Room's new look." Sherryl Connolly of the Daily News wrote that

the surprise of this book is Clinton's spotlighting her domestic duties – when for eight years she has worked so determinedly to expand the role beyond the traditional and expected. But there she is, pictured fingering carpet swatches and fussing over the flower arrangements for last year's millennium celebration dinner.
