= Waiting for the Hour =

1863 painting by William Tolman Carlton

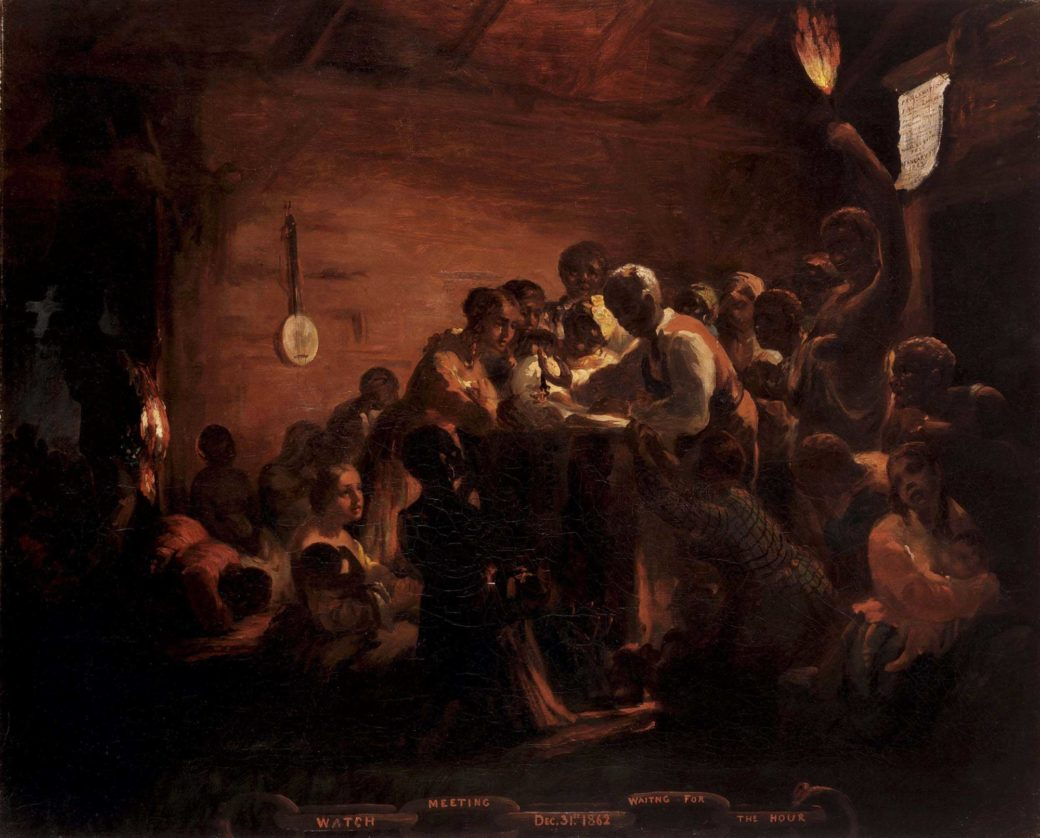
Waiting for the Hour, 1863, White House art collection

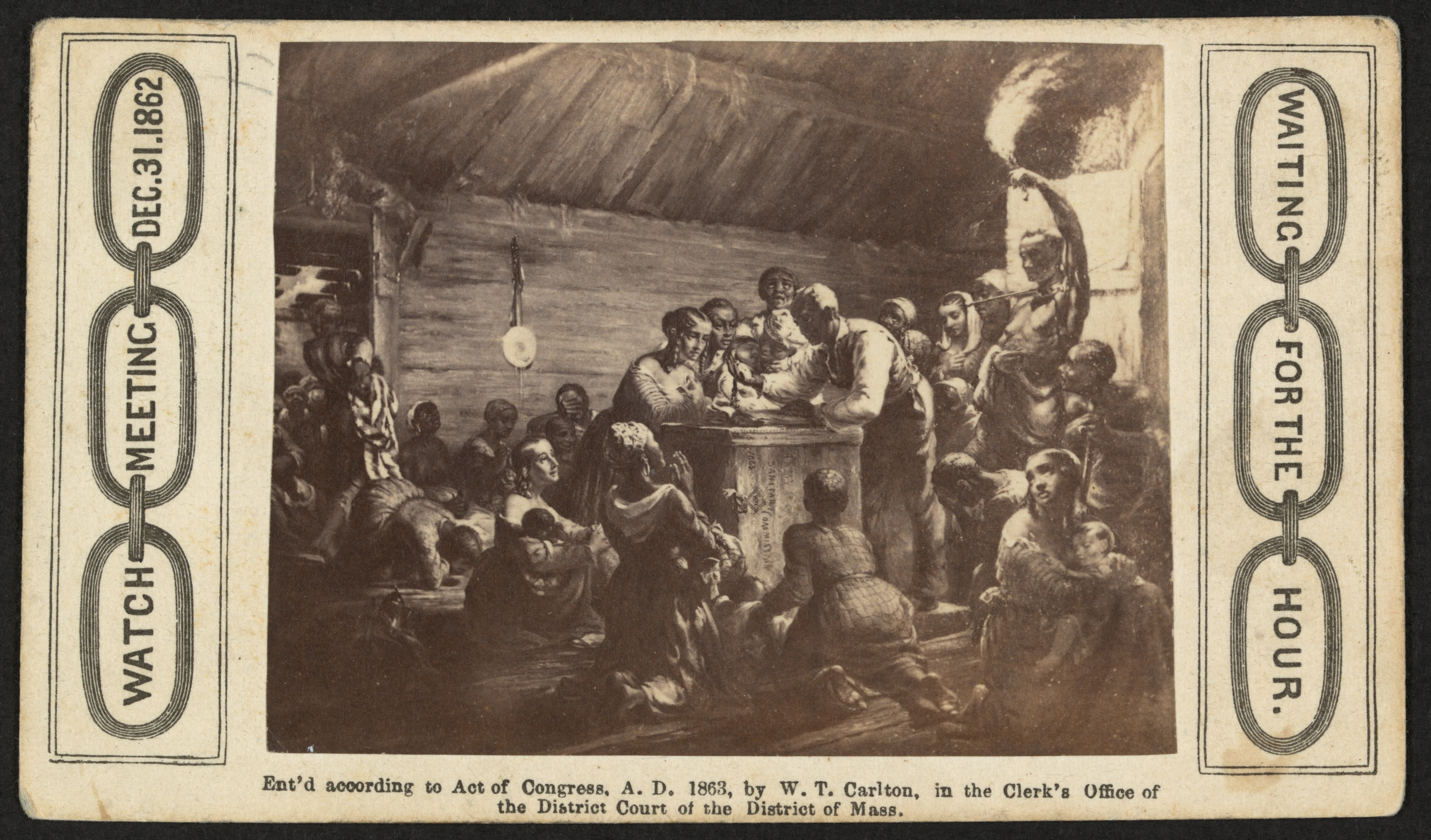
Carte de visite, 1863, held in the Gladstone Collection of African American Photographs at the Library of Congress

Watch Meeting—Dec. 31st 1862—Waiting for the Hour is an 1863 painting by the US artist William Tolman Carlton. The location of the original painting is not known, but a different version, possibly a study, is displayed in the Lincoln Bedroom at the White House.

Watch meetings originated as nighttime religious services of the Methodist Church. The painting depicts a watch meeting or vigil in the dark interior of a wood cabin, with a group of enslaved black men, women and children are covertly gathered on December 31, 1862, around a pulpit made from U.S. Sanitary Commission crates. An older black man stands with a book and a large pocket watch with an anchor at the end of its chain, a symbol of hope. To his right sits a white woman holding a black baby. The man and woman may be intended to resemble Harriet Beecher Stowe and Uncle Tom. Several other women are sitting or kneeling in prayer, and one has prostrated herself. They are all waiting in expectation for the Emancipation Proclamation to be issued by the U.S. President Abraham Lincoln the following day, concerned to make sure that the President carries through with the preliminary proclamation that he published on September 22, 1862.

To the left, in the doorway, a black person holds the U.S. flag draped over their arms. Outside, an illuminated cross can be seen in the night sky. A banjo hangs on the wall. In the upper right of the painting a slave in a neck collar holds a torch aloft above a copy of the Emancipation Proclamation hanging on the wall. The proclamation's title reads "Proclamation / 1st Jan. / For ever free / Slave", and at the bottom of the artwork the paintings name is written out on the links of a metal chain.

The abolitionist William Lloyd Garrison wrote in a letter to Lincoln on January 21, 1865 that it was "an admirable painting" which abolitionist donors in Boston had contributed "upwards of five hundred dollars" to give as a gift to Lincoln. The original version of the painting disappeared after Lincoln's death, possibly removed by his wife, Mary Todd Lincoln. A different version, possibly a study, was found at an antiques shop in New York City in 1975, and it was presented to the White House by the Republican Party in 1976, to commemorate the 200th anniversary of the United States Declaration of Independence in 1776. It is displayed in the Lincoln Bedroom at the White House.

The painting was widely spread by copies on engraved copies on cartes de visite, in which the details are clearer than the known painted version held by the White House.

== See also ==
- Art in the White House
