= Frank D. Reeves =

African American lawyer, civil rights activist, and politician

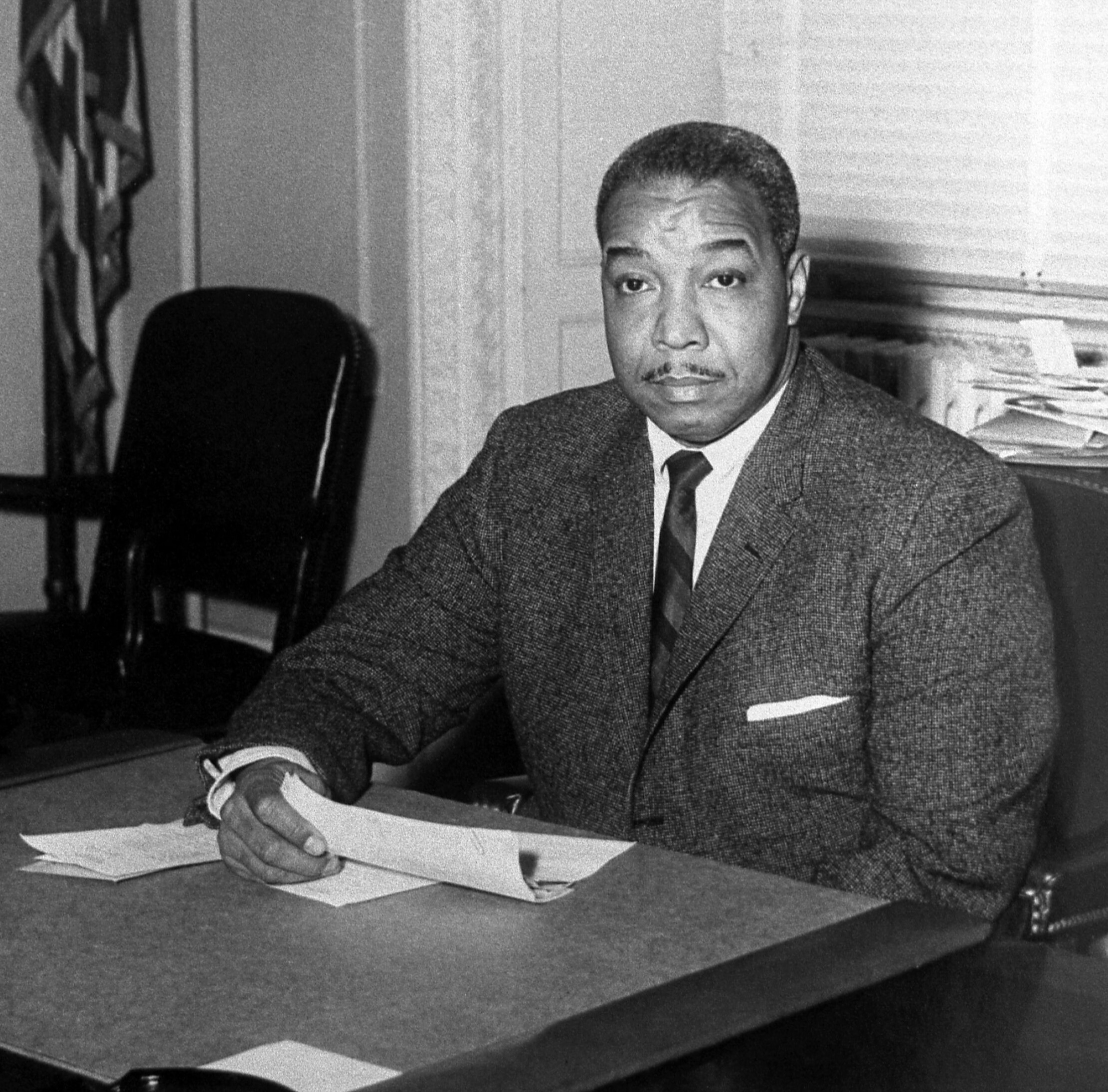
- Born: 23 March 1916; Montreal
- Died: 8 April 1973 (aged 57); Howard University Hospital
- Spouse(s): Elizabeth Walker Stone

Frank Daniel Reeves (March 23, 1916 - April 8, 1973) was an African American lawyer, civil rights activist, and politician who was the first African American member of the Democratic National Committee, the first African American to serve as a Presidential administrative assistant, and served as an attorney for the plaintiffs in Brown v. Board of Education (1954) and Brown II (1955).

He also participated in Burns v. Wilson (1953) and acted as counsel to Congressman Adam Clayton Powell Jr. in Powell v. McCormack before the US Supreme Court (1968-69). He studied at Shaw Junior High School and Dunbar High School in Washington, D.C., and earned undergraduate and law degrees (1939) from Howard University, where he later held a full professorship and taught full-time or part-time for most of his life.

== Career ==
Reeves served then-Candidate John F. Kennedy as a minority affairs adviser during his 1960 campaign, and ran for and was elected as the first African American member of the Democratic National Committee in 1960, where he seconded Kennedy's nomination as the Democratic Party's Presidential Candidate. Historian Brett Gadsden considered Frank D. Reeves -- along with Kennedy's other black campaign advisors, Louis E. Martin and Marjorie Lawson -- to be essential in convincing prominent black figures to endorse and vote for him in the 1960 United States presidential election, leading to his victory in Maryland, Illinois and Michigan and leading to his overall victory.

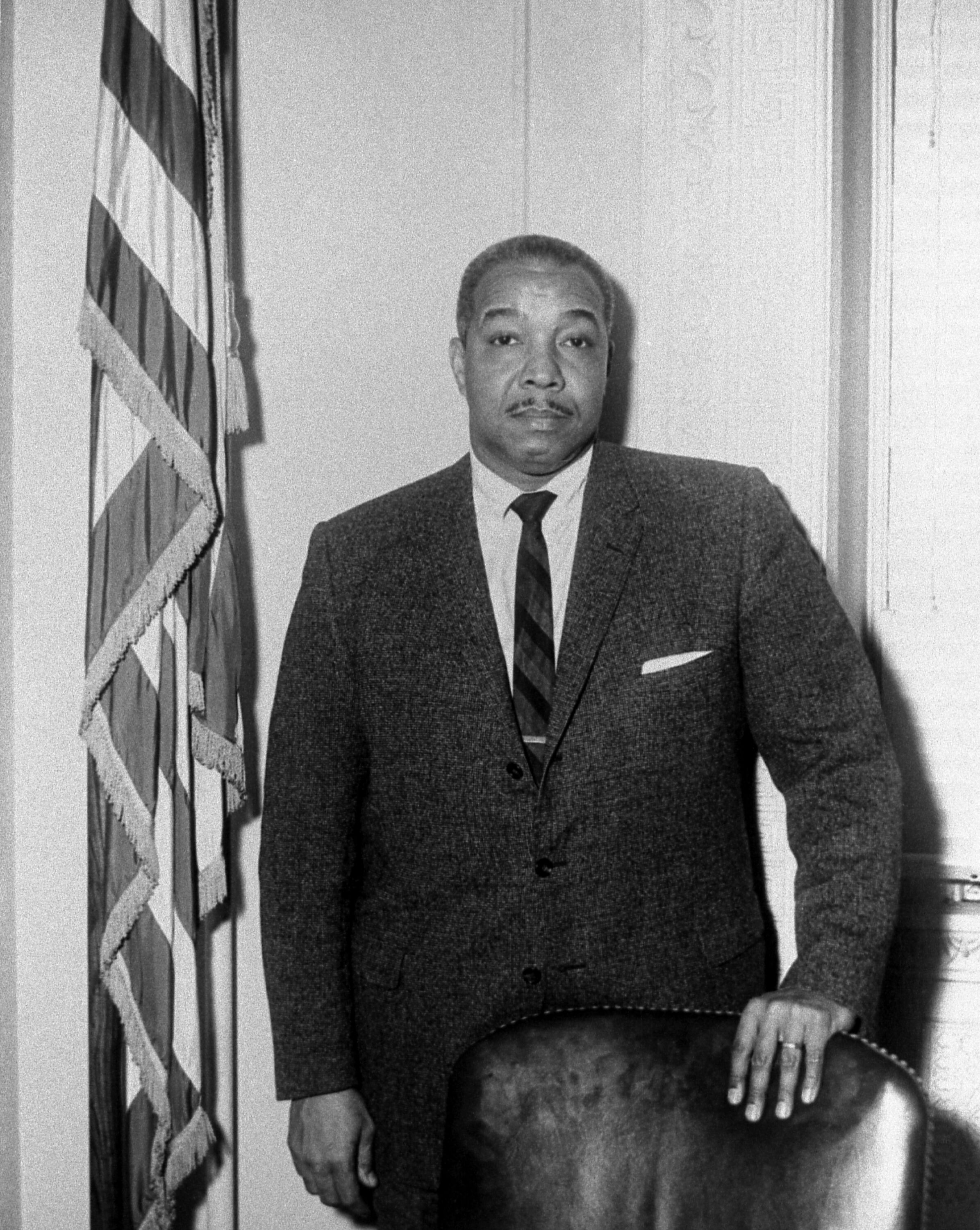
Frank D. Reeves photographed as a Special Assistant to the President in the White House on January 21, 1961.

After Kennedy became President of the United States in January 1961, Reeves became the first African American to serve as a Presidential administrative assistant. Kennedy nominated him to the governing commission of the District of Columbia, but withdrew the nomination in June 1961 following a Senate inquiry into his tax payments.

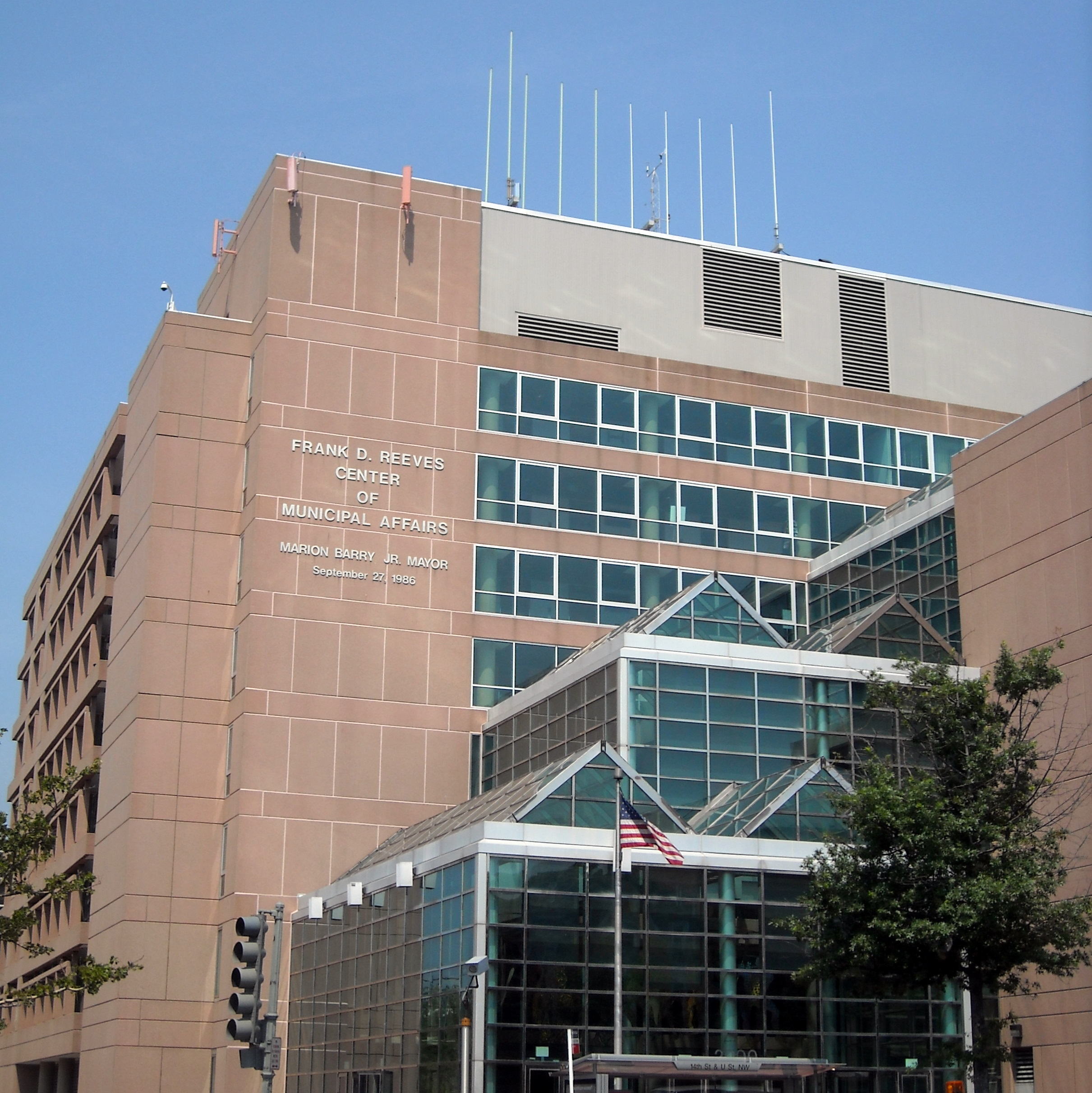
The Frank D. Reeves Municipal Center in Washington, D.C., is named after Frank D. Reeves.

He served on Howard University's Board of Trustees from 1961 to 1966, and was a founding member of the National Conference of Black Lawyers in 1969. In 1970, he became the first executive director of the Joint Center for Political Studies.

== Personal life ==
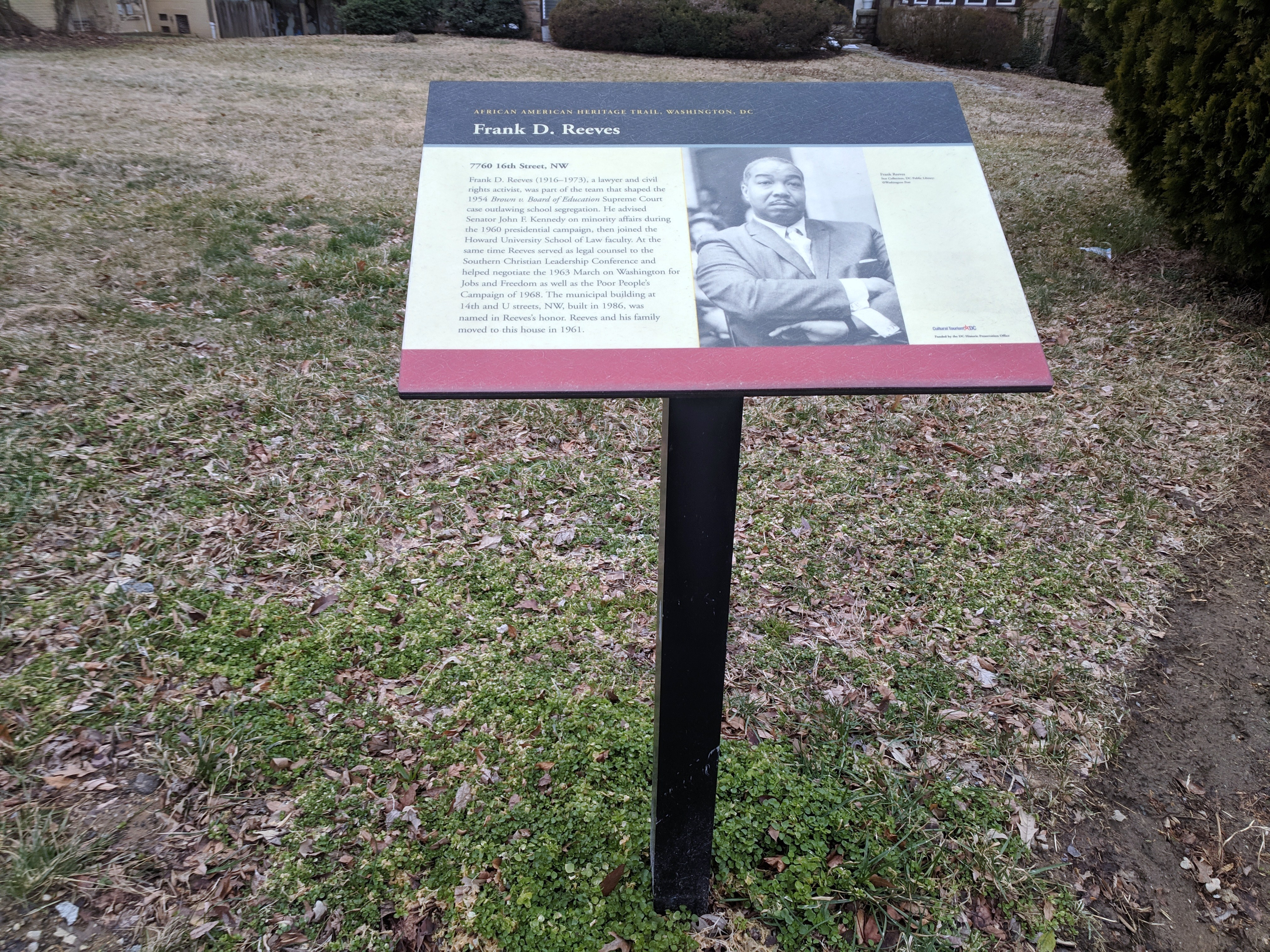
A heritage trail marker on the African American Heritage Trail for Frank D. Reeves in front of his former home at 7760 16th Street NW, Washington DC.

Reeves and his family lived at 3934 New Hampshire Avenue NW in Washington D.C. for many years until 1961, when they moved to 7760 16th Street NW. Cultural Tourism DC has placed a historic marker in front of this home on the African American Heritage Trail.

== Death ==
He died six weeks after suffering a stroke on Sunday, April 8, 1973 in Freedmen's Hospital (now Howard University Hospital) in Washington DC.

== US Supreme Court cases argued ==
- Burns v. Wilson (346 U.S. 137, argued Feb. 5, 1953)
- Brown et al v. Board Of Education Of Topeka et al (347 U.S. 483, argued December 9, 1952, reargued December 8, 1953, decided May 17, 1954)
- National Association for the Advancement of Colored People v. Williams (359 U.S. 550, argued June 1, 1959)
- National Association for the Advancement of Colored People v. Alabama ex rel. Patterson (360 U.S. 240, argued June 8, 1959, decided Oct 12, 1959)
- Henry v. Collins (380 U.S. 356)
