= Second Emancipation Proclamation =

Envisioned executive order against segregation

The Second Emancipation Proclamation is the term applied to an envisioned executive order that Martin Luther King Jr. and other leaders of the Civil Rights Movement called on President John F. Kennedy to issue. As the Emancipation Proclamation was an executive order issued by President Abraham Lincoln to free all slaves being held in states at war with the Union, the envisioned "Second Emancipation Proclamation" was to use the powers of the executive office to strike a severe blow to segregation.

== Kennedy and politics ==
Writing in The New York Times, Professor David W. Blight and Allison Scharfstein point out, "During the 1960 presidential debates, Kennedy had suggested that he would address equality of opportunity by the 'stroke of the president's pen.'" Although President Kennedy opposed segregation and had shown support for the civil rights of African Americans, he originally believed in a more measured approach to legislation, given the political realities he faced in Congress. The white Southern Democrats in Congress were a powerful voting block and many of the congressional committees were chaired by Southern segregationists.

Noting this lack of progress, King told his legal adviser Clarence B. Jones, "What we need to do is to get Kennedy to issue a second Emancipation Proclamation on the anniversary of the first one." On June 6, 1961, King announced this idea during a New York news conference, saying "Just as Abraham Lincoln had the vision to see almost 100 years ago that this nation could not exist half-free, the present administration must have the insight to see that today the nation cannot exist half-segregated and half-free." Jones and a team of legal scholars (which would include members of the Gandhi Society for Human Rights) began to prepare the proposal, while King continued to publicize the idea.

== King's meeting with Kennedy ==
During a tour of the Lincoln Sitting Room with Kennedy in October 1961, King pressed Kennedy for a proclamation "outlawing segregation". Kennedy said he would take it under consideration and asked King for a draft of the proposal. Two months afterward King, while campaigning against segregation in Albany, Georgia. sent the President a personal telegram urging him to take action. National newspapers took up the story and a debate began over whether such an executive order would be legal outside of wartime.

== Drafting ==
On March 24, 1962, King announced that he had been invited by President Kennedy to submit for the President's signature a "second Emancipation Proclamation". King and his legal staff declared that they would have the document ready on May 17, 1962, the eighth anniversary of the decision of Brown v. Board of Education.

== Delivery of the text ==
On May 17, 1962, Kennedy received King's work in a document presented "On Behalf of the Negro Citizenry of the United States of America in Commemoration of the Centennial of the Proclamation of Emancipation". It called "For National Rededication to the Principles of the Emancipation Proclamation and for an Executive Order Prohibiting Segregation in the United States of America". The document opened, "Mr. President, sometimes there occur moments in the history of a nation when it becomes necessary to pause and reflect upon the heritage of the past in order to determine the most meaningful course for the present and the future. America today, in the field of race relations, is at such a moment.... Thus, as we approach the 100th anniversary of the Emancipation Proclamation, eight years after the unanimous United States Supreme Court desegregation decision in Brown v. Board of Education, we want to present for your consideration our thoughts on the way in which the legal and moral responsibility to end state enforced segregation and discrimination can be met.... We believe the Centennial of the Emancipation Proclamation is a peculiarly appropriate time for all our citizens to rededicate themselves to those early precepts and principles of equality before the law." Historian David W. Blight points out that King's preamble in the document made reference to many "cultural precedents of American freedom, including Bruce Catton's popular Civil War books, Woody Guthrie's folk song "This Land Is Your Land", the Gettysburg Address, the autobiography by Frederick Douglass and Kennedy's own 'Strategy for Peace.'"

King went on to review the historical events around Lincoln's Emancipation Proclamation, including a quote from Frederick Douglass on awaiting word of President Lincoln's announcement. King linked this with the America of his and Kennedy's day, writing, "we believe the time has come for Presidential leadership to be vigorously exerted to remove, once and for all time, the festering cancer of segregation and discrimination from American society. The struggle for freedom, Mr. President, of which our Civil War was but a bloody chapter, continues throughout our land today." Reviewing the limitations of the Judiciary branch, and invoking the memory of Lincoln, King wrote "The conscience of America looks now, again, some one hundred years after the abolition of chattel slavery, to the President of the United States."

King proposed "in glorious commemoration of the Centennial of the Emancipation Proclamation" that the president use "the full powers of your office ... to eliminate all forms of statutory-imposed segregation and discrimination", to declare that all school districts desegregate by September 1963, with "the Department of Health, Education and Welfare to immediately prepare, in consultation with local school officials, a program of integration in compliance with the mandate of Brown v. Board of Education." The document also proposed that Kennedy prohibit racial segregation in "Federally assisted housing" and announce "That any and all laws within the United States requiring segregation or discrimination because of race or color are contrary to the national policy of the Government of the United States and are detrimental and inimical to the best interest of the United States at home and abroad."

The document went on to cite legal precedents by the hundreds, making special note of Harry S. Truman's military desegregation order of 1948.

== Results ==
Kennedy did not take the opportunity to issue a second Emancipation Proclamation "and noticeably avoided all centennial celebrations of emancipation." In November 1962, Kennedy did issue Executive Order 11063, prohibiting racial discrimination in federally supported housing or "related facilities", and months afterwards introduced an omnibus civil rights bill to Congress after his civil rights address on national television and radio. The fulfillment of the vision of King and the Civil Rights Movement against segregation came with the landmark Civil Rights Act of 1964 which was pushed through a bitterly divided Congress and signed by President Lyndon B. Johnson in 1964.

In his acceptance speech for the Nobel Peace Prize in December 1964 King spoke of the Civil Rights Act, saying "Then came that glowing day a few months ago when a strong Civil Rights bill became the law of our Land. This bill, which was first recommended and promoted by President Kennedy was passed because of overwhelming support and perseverance from millions of Americans, Negro and White. It came as a bright interlude in the long and sometimes turbulent struggle for Civil Rights: the beginning of a second Emancipation Proclamation providing a comprehensive legal basis for equality of opportunity."

== Legacy ==
Historian David W. Blight points out that, although the document calling for an executive order to act as a second Emancipation Proclamation "has been virtually forgotten", the manifesto that King and his associates produced showed his "close reading of American politics" and recalled how moral leadership could have an effect on the American public through an executive order. Despite its failure "to spur a second Emancipation Proclamation from the White House, it was an important and emphatic attempt to combat the structured forgetting of emancipation latent within Civil War memory."
