= Rómulo Yanes =

American photographer (1959–2021)

- Born: Rómulo Abraham Yanes; February 17, 1959; Fomento, Cuba
- Died: June 16, 2021 (aged 62); Tampa, Florida, U.S.
- Occupation: Photographer
- Spouse: Robert Schaublin-Yanes

Rómulo Abraham Yanes (February 17, 1959 – June 16, 2021) was an American photographer who worked for Gourmet magazine. He studied photography at the School of Visual Arts in the early 1980s and began working as a photographer as a teenager. After completing his college education, he began working for the publishing house Condé Nast for Gourmet. Yanes photographed on the road and in the studio, both home styled and restaurant dishes, chefs, ingredients, food markets, and entertaining features. His cover work and culinary artistry contributed to Gourmet, winning the ASME award for photography in 2005 and again in 2008. After Gourmet concluded publication, he shot for Bon Appétit, Martha Stewart Living, Everyday Food, and Health, and became a regular contributor to Williams Sonoma Cooks Catalogue and for Epicurious.

== Early life ==
Yanes was born in Fomento, Cuba, on February 17, 1959. His father, Abraham, worked as an auto mechanic; his mother, Caridad (Nieblas), was employed as a seamstress. He and family left Cuba via Freedom Flights when he was eight years old; they ultimately relocated to Weehawken, New Jersey. His interest in photography was piqued when he took a course on it in high school. He studied at the School of Visual Arts in New York City during the early 1980s. After graduating, he worked as the manager of a photo studio.

== Career ==
Yanes began his photography career assisting Frances McLaughlin-Gill, Irene Stern (his professor) and Carl Fisher (whom Stern introduced to him). He later continued his career at Condé Nast's publication Gourmet. He went on to be the staff photographer there for over twenty-five years, before the publication shut down in 2009. The magazine won the National Magazine Award for general excellence in 2004, its leading accolade, which was followed by awards in the photography category in 2005 and 2008.

Yanes photographed for 35 publications, including some of the food and dining photographs for Hillary Clinton's 2000 book An Invitation to the White House (which featured many photographers overall) and a book on Jacqueline Kennedy Onassis titled Cooking for Madam Recipes and Reminiscences from the Home of Jacqueline Kennedy Onassis by Marta Sgubin.

Yanes' photography appeared in international magazines, not only Gourmet and Bon Appetit, but also Martha Stewart Living, Everyday Food, Cooking Light, Health and GQ, among others. He also played a small role as a gourmet photographer in the 2001 movie Dinner with Friends, which featured Dennis Quaid, Andie MacDowell, Toni Collette and Greg Kinnear.

== Personal life ==
Yanes was married to Robert Schaublin-Yanes until the former's death. Yanes died on June 16, 2021, at his home in Tampa, Florida. He was 62, and suffered from peritoneal cancer prior to his death.

== Works ==
- An Invitation to the White House: At Home With History by Hillary Rodham Clinton, some photographs by Romulo Yanes ISBN 0684857995
- "Cooking for Madam: Recipes and Reminiscences from the Home of Jacqueline Kennedy Onassis" by Marta Sgubin. ISBN 0684850052
- Best Of Gourmet 2001 (Featuring The Flavors of Sicily) Gourmet Magazine Editors; Romulo A. Yanes ISBN 0-375-50604-7
- The Best Of Gourmet Featuring The Flavors Of San Francisco Gourmet Magazine; Romulo A. Yanes ISBN 1-4000-6057-5
- Gourmet's Weekends/Seasonal Menus and Recipes for Casual Gatherings Gourmet (EDT)/ Yanes, Romulo A. (PHT) ISBN 9780679445685
- Gourmet's Quick Kitchen Yanes, Romulo A. (PHT) ISBN 9780679452577
- The Best of Gourmet, 1994 Gourmet Magazine Editors, Photographs by Romulo Yanes. ISBN 0-679-43347-3
- Gourmet Everyday Yanes, Romulo A. (PHT) ISBN 0-375-50445-1
- The Best of Gourmet 1996 From the Editors of Gourmet, Photographs by Romulo Yanes. ISBN 0-679-44936-1
- The Best of Gourmet 1997 From the Editors of Gourmet, Photographs by Romulo Yanes. ISBN 0-679-45735-6
- Gourmet's in Short Order: Recipes in 45 Minutes or Less and Easy Menus Editors, Gourmet Magazine, Photographs by Romulo Yanes. ISBN 0-679-42745-7
- Gourmet's America, Editors of Gourmet, Photographs by Romulo Yanes. ISBN 0-679-43563-8
- Gluten-Free Baking: More Than 125 Recipes for Delectable Sweet and Savory Baked Goods, Including Cakes, Pies, Quick Breads, Muffins, Cookies, and Other Delights Rebecca Reilly; Photographer-Romulo Yanes ISBN 0-684-87252-8
- The Best of Gourmet 2000 The Editors of Gourmet Photographs by Romulo Yanes. ISBN 978-0-375-50431-0
- The Best Of Gourmet, 1994 Ed. ISBN 0-679-43347-3
- Gourmet's In-Short-Order Photographs by Romulo Yanes. ISBN 0-679-42745-7
- Gourmet's Menus for Contemporary Living Richter, Evie, Photographs by Romulo Yanes. ISBN 0-394-54589-3
- The Best of Gourmet 1995 The Editors of Gourmet, Photographs by Romulo Yanes. ISBN 9780679441465
- The Best of Gourmet, 1996. Flavors of England Ireland & Scotland. Editors of Gourmet photos by Romulo Yanes ISBN 9780679449362
- The Best of Gourmet, 1998. Flavors of India. Editors of Gourmet photos by Romulo Yanes' ISBN 9780375501388
- Best of Gourmet 1988 Edition Editors of Gourmet, Photographs by Romulo Yanes. ISBN 9780394569550
- The Best Of Gourmet: 1988 Edition – All Of The Beautifully Illustrated Menus From 1987 Plus Over 500 Selected Recipes.Editors Of Gourmet; Yanes, Romulo A. (photography). ISBN 0-394-56955-5
- Gourmet's Parties Editors of Gourmet, Photographs by Romulo Yanes. ISBN 0-375-50030-8
- The Best of Gourmet 1997: Featuring the Flavors of Greece Gourmet, Editors of Photographs by Romulo Yanes. 0-679-45735-6.
- The Best of Gourmet 1999; Featuring The Flavors of Spain Editors of Gourmet ISBN 978-0-375-50296-5
- The Best of Gourmet : Featuring the Flavors of Mexico / Tenth Anniversary Edition Editors of Gourmet ISBN 0-679-44146-8
- Gourmet Every Day Editors of Gourmet ISBN 0-375-50445-1
- The Best of Gourmet: Featuring the Flavors of Thailand Gourmet Magazine Editors, Romulo A. Yanes (Photographer) ISBN 0-375-50431-1
- Dining at the Homestead Schnarwyler, Albert; Ferguson, Eleanor; Ferguson, James Romulo A. Yanes (Photographer) ISBN 9780962765001
- Gourmet's Fresh: From the Farmers Market to Your Kitchen – First Edition, with an Introduction By Ruth Reichl Editorial Staff; Gourmet, Romulo A. Yanes (Photographer) ISBN 9780375503412
- The Best of Gourmet 2004. Featuring The Flavors Of Rome. The Editors of Gourmet. ISBN 1-4000-6253-5
- Just Tacos: 100 Delicious Recipes for Breakfast, Lunch, and Dinner Wiseman, Shelley / Yanes, Romulo (Photos) ISBN 9781600854071
- Gourmet's Sweets: Desserts for Every Occasion Editors of Gourmet, Yanes, Romulo (Photos) ISBN 0-375-50200-9
- The Best of Gourmet 1995 Tenth Anniversary Edition editors of Gourmet, color photos by Romulo A. Yanes
- The Best Of Gourmet – 2002. Editors Of Gourmet; Yanes, Romulo A. (photography). ISBN 0-375-50850-3
- The Book of Burger Ray, Rachael / Yanes, Romulo (Photos) ISBN 9781451659696
- The Best of Gourmet 2000: Featuring the Flavors of Thailand Editors of Gourmet, ISBN 0-375-50431-1
- The Best Of Gourmet – A Year Of Celebrations (20th Anniversary Edition) Gourmet Magazine Editors ISBN 1-4000-6364-7
- Nick Malgieri's Bread: Over 60 Breads, Rolls and Cakes Plus Delicious Recipes Using Them, Malgieri, Nick / Yanes, Romulo (Photos)ISBN 9781906868741
- Truly Mexican: Essential Recipes and Techniques for Authentic Mexican Cooking, Roberto Santibanez, JJ Goode, Romulo Yanes ISBN 0-470-49955-9
