= President's Dining Room =

Dining room in the northwest corner of the second floor of the White House

Coordinates: 38°53′52″N 77°02′11″W

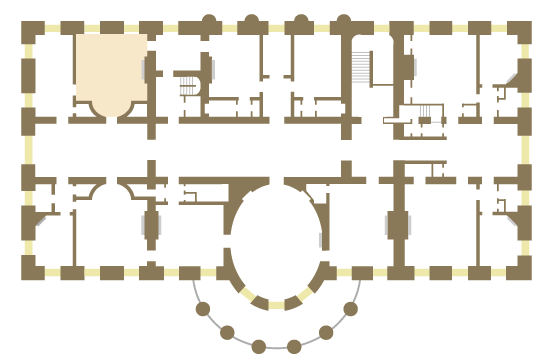
White House Second Floor showing the location of the President's Dining Room

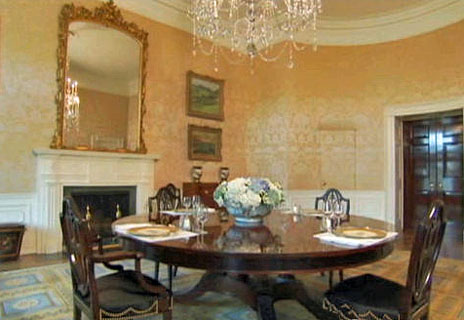
The President's Dining Room in 2008.

The President's Dining Room is a dining room located in the northwest corner of the second floor of the White House. It is located directly above the Family Dining Room on the State Floor and looks out upon the North Lawn. The Dining Room is adjacent to the Family Kitchen, a small kitchen designed for use by the First Family, and served by a dumbwaiter connected to the main kitchen on the ground floor.

Beginning in the 19th century the space was occupied by a bedroom suite known as the Prince of Wales Room, named for an 1860 stay by the then-Prince of Wales, Albert Edward. From 1929 to 1948, this suite was known as the Lincoln Bedroom, with furnishings acquired by First Lady Mary Todd Lincoln (the current Lincoln Bedroom is now down the hall, in what was Lincoln's office suite). The bedroom suite was structurally changed in 1961 to create a dining room and kitchen in the First Family's residence.

== Early history of the room ==
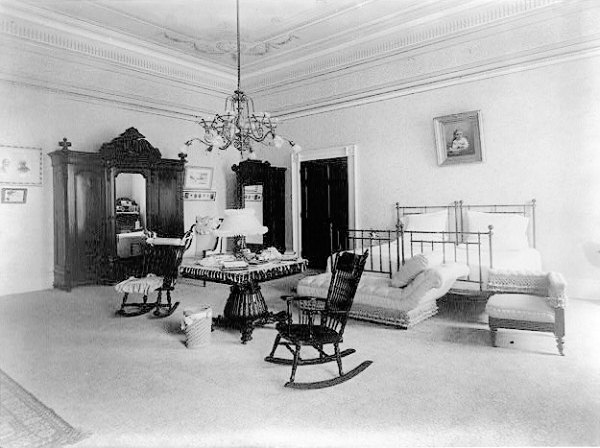
The Prince of Wales Room some time between 1897 and 1900, when it served as First Lady Ida McKinley's bedroom

The President's Dining Room is located in the northwest corner of the Second Floor. When this part of the Executive Residence was completed in 1809, a bedroom suite occupied the space. What is now the private stairs and Cosmetology Room were the eastern chamber and closet of the suite, (Note: The southern third of the space was a closet. The northern two-thirds of this space was the bedchamber.) A bedroom and toilet occupied what is now the President's Dining Room, and a lady's dressing room was in the space currently occupied by the Family Kitchen, the kitchen storage space, and the pantry.

This space was little changed by 1825. Since the private stairs from the Ground Floor were now complete, the closet in the eastern chamber was removed and a landing for the stairs inserted in the middle of the room. This effectively created an open storage area in the southern third of the chamber. First Lady Louisa Adams and her niece, Mary Hellen, used the bedroom and dressing room as a bedroom suite (but did not occupy the eastern chamber). From March 1829 to the summer of 1830, all three rooms were occupied by Jack and Emily Donelson and their four children. (Note: President Jackson's wife, Rachel Jackson, died before her husband took office. Emily acted as hostess for her father until the summer of 1830, when the Petticoat affair created a rift between them. Emily declined to return to the White House. Sarah Yorke Jackson, the president's daughter-in-law, served as hostess from November 1834 to March 1837. Sources differ on whether Emily Donelson and her family ever returned to the White House.) President William Henry Harrison used the larger bedroom as his personal bedroom during his 32-day presidency in 1841. Robert Tyler (son of President John Tyler), his wife, and daughter used all three rooms from April 1841 to March 1845. From 1845 to 1849, the bedroom, dressing room, and eastern chamber were used by Augusta Tabb Walker and her two small children. (Note: She was the wife of J. Knox Walker. He was President James K. Polk's nephew and private secretary.)

=== The Prince of Wales Room ===
The bedroom suite became known as the Prince of Wales Room after Albert Edward, Prince of Wales stayed in the room in 1860. Although a full bath was added to the eastern chamber, there was no connecting door between it and the bedroom. (Note: It is unclear when the bath was added, but Phillips-Schrock says it was definitely in place by 1865. Willets places the bath's addition to before 1861.) To accommodate the bathroom, the stairs were moved from the middle to the southern part of the room, and the storage space eliminated. ] Mary Todd Lincoln's refurbishment of the White House in 1861 led to historic changes in the room. Mrs. Lincoln purchased two armchairs,{{Efn|These were possibly made by John Henry Belter in New York City. a rosewood center table,{{Efn|This table featured a white marble top, cabriole legs carved with birds and grapes, clawed feet, and a carved, pierced apron. It may also have been made by Belter. a chest of drawers, four side balloon-back (Note: The balloon-backed chair is so named because its back resembles the shape of a hot air balloon: Curved around a center point, moving vertical and then back and outward.) side chairs, (Note: The side chairs may also have been made by Belter.) a sofa, and—most importantly—a 6-foot (2 m) wide, 8-foot (2 m) long rosewood bed frame for the room. The headboard was pierced and richly carved with images of birds, grapes, and vines. The footboard featured similar, though more simply-carved, images. Attached to the headboard was a gilt canopy carved in the shape of a crown, with a shield in the front. Purple satin trimmed in gold lace hung from the canopy. This bed became known as the "Lincoln bed", even though President Lincoln is not known to have slept in it. Mrs. Lincoln also purchased a Wilton carpet (Note: "Wilton carpet" is a manufacturing term describing carpet manufactured in Wilton, UK in a cut-pile form. Furnished at the same time as named "Lincoln Bedroom", this room's carpet was possibly bought from the same New York City department store, Alexander T. Stewart & Co.) to cover the floor, and purple-tinted French velvet wallpaper with crimson stripes and repetitive golden images of a moss rose tree in bloom.

In this configuration, the bedroom was used by young Willie Lincoln, who died of fever in this room in 1862. On April 16, 1865, Dr. Janvier Woodward and Dr. Edward Curtis autopsied, and Dr. Charles D. Brown embalmed, Abraham Lincoln in this room.

First Lady Eliza Johnson used the small eastern chamber as her bedroom, while the First Family used the larger bedroom (later to be the President's Dining Room) as a living room. The large room was later used as a bedroom by Nellie Grant (daughter of President Ulysses S. Grant); (Note: This is an assumption of historians, as the evidence is unclear as to which room Nellie Grant used.) Fanny Hayes (daughter of President Rutherford B. Hayes); (Note: This is an assumption of historians, as the evidence is unclear as to which room Fanny Hayes used.) Mary "Mollie" Garfield (daughter of President James Garfield); (Note: This is an assumption of historians, as the evidence is unclear as to which room Mollie Garfield used.) Ellen "Nell" Arthur (daughter of President Chester Arthur); (Note: This is an assumption of historians, as the evidence is unclear as to which room Nell Arthur used.) President Grover Cleveland and First Lady Frances Cleveland; (Note: President Cleveland, a bachelor, initially occupied the room alone. After his marriage to Frances Folson on June 2, 1886, the President and First Lady lived together in the room. Cleveland failed to win re-election in 1888. But he won the presidency again in 1892, and once more the Clevelands occupied this space together.) James Robert and Mary Harrison McKee and their two small children;{{Efn|First Lady Caroline Harrison died on October 25, 1892. Her daughter, Mary, took over hostess duties at the White House for her father, President Benjamin Harrison. The eastern chamber served as the nursery/bedroom for the children. President William McKinley and his wife, Ida; Alice Roosevelt (daughter of President Theodore Roosevelt); (Note: Alice Roosevelt married Nicholas Longworth on February 17, 1906, at which time she left the Executive Residence.) Ethel Roosevelt (daughter of President Theodore Roosevelt); (Note: Ethel Roosevelt first occupied the room in mid-February 1906, after her sister, Alice, married and left the White House.) First Lady Helen Taft; Eleanor Wilson (daughter of President Woodrow Wilson); (Note: Eleanor Wilson married William Gibbs McAdoo on May 7, 1914, after which time she left the Executive Residence.) and Calvin Coolidge, Jr.; (Note: Calvin first occupied the room in August 1923. The 16-year-old boy died of sepsis (blood poisoning) on July 7, 1924.)

The room was used as a surgery in 1907 when newly-married Alice Roosevelt (now Alice Roosevelt Longworth) was stricken by appendicitis. Rather than go to a hospital, her appendectomy was performed in the Prince of Wales Room.

=== Lincoln Bedroom ===
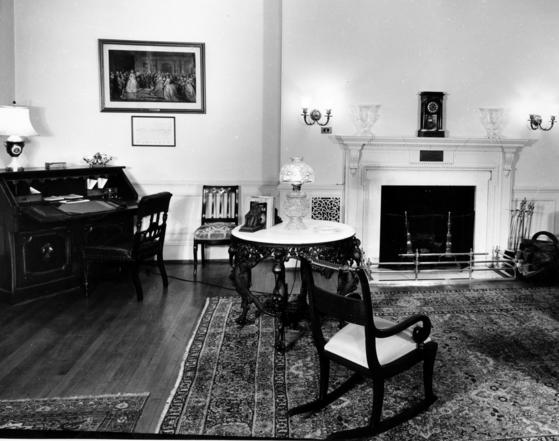
Lincoln Bedroom in 1947

After the death of Calvin Coolidge, Jr. in July 1924, the bedroom suite was unoccupied for some years. In 1929, the Coolidges moved the "Lincoln Bed" into the bedroom suite and formally renamed it the Lincoln Bedroom. This large, four-poster bed had been purchased by Mary Todd Lincoln in 1861 and placed in the Prince of Wales Room. Although there is no evidence Abraham Lincoln ever slept in it, it subsequently became known as the Lincoln Bed. It had moved to several other rooms (and even placed in storage) in the intervening years, but now was restored to its original setting.

The Lincoln Bedroom was used as a guest bedroom until the Franklin D. Roosevelt administration, when it was occupied by Lorena Hickok (journalist and aide to First Lady Eleanor Roosevelt). (Note: Historian Carl Anthony Sferazza claims that FDR's aide, Louis Howe, and his wife Grace Howe lived in this bedroom. But historian Jean Edward Smith says the Howes occupied the Lincoln Bedroom.) After Roosevelt's death in 1945, it became the bedroom of Margaret Truman, daughter of President Harry S. Truman.

Major architectural changes were made to the Lincoln Bedroom when the White House was gutted and renovated in 1952. In the smaller eastern chamber, the bathroom was removed, the stairs were widened, and the stairs moved into the middle of the space (which allowed an enclosed storage space to be created south of the stairs). The passage from the eastern chamber to the bedroom was closed as well. The 1952 reconstruction turned the bedroom into a mirror image of the president's bedroom across the Center Hall. The bedroom's south wall was made convex, which created a walled-off dead space in the room's southeast corner. The southwest corner now became storage space accessible from the dressing room. After the reconstruction, Margaret Truman continued to use it as her bedroom. In 1953, First Lady Mamie Eisenhower turned it from a bedroom into a sitting room for her mother, Elivera "Minnie" Doud.

=== From Lincoln Bedroom into dining room ===
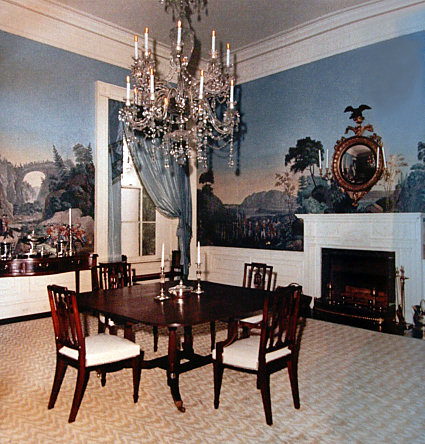
The President's Dining Room after its creation during the Kennedy administration

In 1961, First Lady Jacqueline Kennedy transformed the Lincoln Bedroom into the President's Dining Room. Kennedy felt the Family Dining Room on the State Floor was too cavernous and impersonal in which to raise a young family, and decided that a smaller, more intimate dining room should be created on the Second Floor. A small kitchen took over the space which was once a dressing room, with a pantry and storage space occupying the southern half of the space. (Note: A dumbwaiter connected this kitchen with the main kitchen on the ground floor.) (The storage closet created in the now-convex room to the east was accessed from the new pantry.) The bedroom became the new Family Dining Room.

At first, the walls of the President's Dining Room were merely painted off-white, and the room furnished with Louis XVI chairs and a table belonging to the Kennedys. During the presidential transition, Kennedy was advised on White House decor by her veteran interior decorator and good friend Dorothy "Sister" Kinnicutt Parish. Although Kennedy chose French interior designer Stéphane Boudin to decorate most of the executive mansion, his design for the President's Dining Room was rejected in favor of Sister Parish's recommendations.

The look of the President's Dining Room was defined by its wallpaper. The wallpaper was a 1960 reproduction of paper printed by Zuber et Cie in France some time in the early to mid 1800s. It was discovered in a London antique shop by Kennedy friend and socialite Brooke Astor. Known as "Scenes of Revolutionary America", the wallpaper depicts various events in the American Revolutionary War. The wallpaper is based on an 1834 wallpaper printed by Zuber, "Scenic America", which depicted various American landscapes and which Kennedy had hung in the Diplomatic Reception Room. ("Scenic America", in turn was derived from engravings made by Engelmann in the 1820s.) To match the colors of the wallpaper, window draperies of blue and green silk damask were hung in the room. Their design was a copy of an early 1800s design found in a book. These were topped by window treatments of green silk with gold bullion fringe. A Hereke rug from Turkey, in a similar color style, covered the floor. A mantel made of plaster mixed with other materials, installed over the fireplace in the east wall in 1952, was retained. Designed about 1815 by Robert Welford in Philadelphia, the mantel is inscribed with Commodore Oliver Hazard Perry's famous message, issued after the Battle of Lake Erie in 1813: "We have met the enemy, and they are ours". The room was lit with an Empire style chandelier, manufactured in the 1700s by Waterford Crystal and purchased in London by banker and art collector Chester Dale. It was given to the White House in 1948.{{Efn|It was originally used in the Red Room, but in 1952 was moved to the Blue Room. Mrs. Kennedy briefly moved it to the Green Room in 1962, before permanently moving it to the President's Dining Room.

The room was furnished with Federal style antiques. Twelve dining room chairs, crafted in the Sheraton style in Baltimore in 1785, were donated to the White House in 1961 by Mrs. Charles W. Engelhard, Jr. The chairs were initially reupholstered in an off-white damask approximating mother-of-pearl, designed by Parish and woven by Bergamo Fabrics. The fabric stained too easily, and in early 1963 Mrs. Kennedy asked Boudin to recommend a new upholster. Boudin selected white leather, tooled to look like silk damask and manufactured by Maison Jansen (the design firm for which Boudin worked). The chairs surrounded a Sheraton pedestal dining table. (Note: Provenance of the table is unclear. However, the Yale University Art Gallery says a similar table, made in Massachusetts between 1810 and 1815, may indicate the place and time of manufacture.) The Engelhards also donated a Federalist hunt board crafted in the American South. A side table, attributed to cabinetmaker John Shaw (cabinetmaker) of Annapolis, Maryland; a mahogany sideboard manufactured in New England and originally owned by Daniel Webster; (Note: The sideboard is also of historical significance due to its exceptionally high quality of manufacture. It has an unusual section in front which can be pulled out and used as a desk. This section is inlaid with satinwood in the shape of an eagle surrounded by stars.) a setee with caned seat; and a hunt table in the Hepplewhite style also adorned the room. Additional Federalist dining chairs were donated in 1962.

Serving items in the President's Dining Room during the Kennedy administration included a silver dinner service purchased by President Andrew Jackson in 1833, a tureen purchased by President James Monroe, a French silver dessert service, two French-made wine coolers, and a vegetable serving dish purchased by President Jackson. (Note: The Jackson silver, tarnished almost beyond recognition, was found in a small, obscure cupboard in the White House by the First Lady and Lorraine Waxman Pearce, the first White House Curator.)

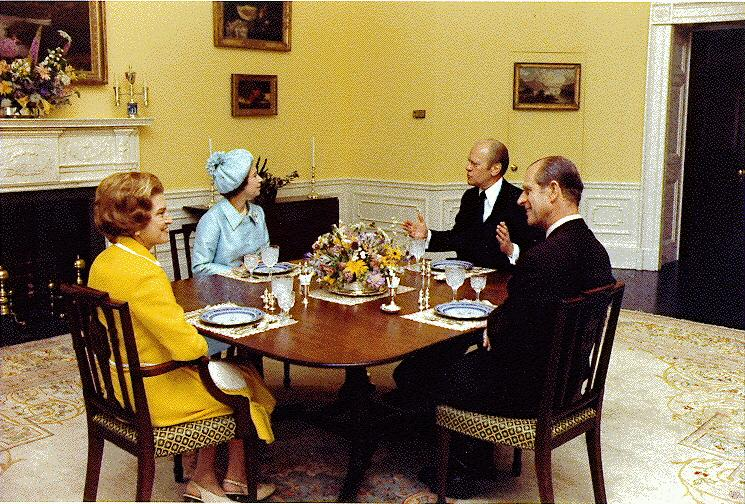
The President's Dining Room in 1976, after the Zuber wallpaper was removed

=== Ford, Carter, and Reagan refurbishments ===
First Lady Betty Ford had the dining room's Zuber wallpaper removed. (The wallpaper was installed with a linen backing, which allowed it to be detached from the wall and rolled up without incurring much damage.) Ford then had the walls painted yellow.

In 1977, First Lady Rosalynn Carter had the Zuber wallpaper reinstalled. In 1984, First Lady Nancy Reagan more extensively refurbished the President's Dining Room. Reproductions were made of the Sheraton chairs, which had suffered extensive wear and tear after nearly a quarter century of use. The reproductions were upholstered in blue horsehair (a historically accurate fabric for the Federal period), with a gold diamond and rosette pattern dyed into it. The Zuber wallpaper in the room was also treated, conserved, and stabilized.

=== Clinton renovation ===
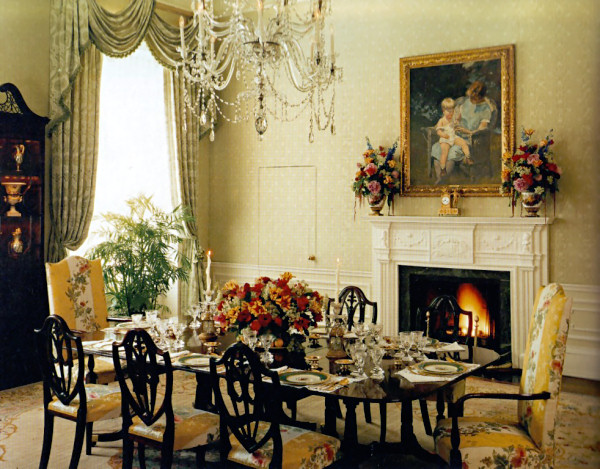
The President's Dining Room after renovation during the Clinton administration

The room was again redecorated in 1997 by Kaki Hockersmith, the personal interior designer for President Bill and Hillary Clinton. Hockersmith felt the room was gloomy due to the color of the wallpaper and the lack of light, but the historic wallpaper could not be removed without incurring further damage. Instead, thin wooden lathes were nailed to the walls, and a new wall covering attached to them. This completely obscured the 1961 wallpaper without having to remove it. For the new wall covering, Hockersmith chose a pale green silk (manufactured by Scalamandré, Inc.) with a moiré pattern, onto which was printed medallions in two different tones of green. Portions of the frieze around the top of the room were painted with a pale yellow glaze to bring out its detail.

A new carpet, in colors complementary to the green wall covering, was also ordered and installed. The carpet, designed by Hockersmith, featured a diagonal grid-like background pattern designed to be both visually stimulating as well as better able to obscure stains and damage. Clusters of flowers and acorns, in the Colonial Revival style, were woven into the field of the carpet, which was woven by Scott Group Custom Carpets in Grand Rapids, Michigan.

The Sheraton chairs were restored to the room, and reupholstered in a bright yellow patterned brocade with a curving garland of flowers down and across the seat. The pedestal table was removed, and a custom 1902 dining room table, designed by architect Stanford White installed. The room was decorated with paintings by Childe Hassam, Edmund C. Tarbell, and Guy C. Wiggins.

=== George W. Bush refurbishment ===
The pale green silk wall covering was removed during the presidency of George W. Bush, replaced by a soft yellow silk damask selected by the Bushes' interior decorator, Ken Blasingame.

=== Melania Trump renovation ===
During President Donald Trump's first term, First Lady Melania Trump played a significant role, shaping architecture, landscape, preserving historic interiors, and enhancing decorative arts to carry the White House forward. She oversaw the conservation of the historic Zuber wall covering.

== Bibliography ==
- Abbott, James Archer (2007). Jansen Furniture. New York: Acanthus Press. ISBN 978-0-926-49445-9.
- Anthony, Carl Sferrazza (2000). America's First Families: An Inside View of 200 Years of Private Life in the White House. New York: Simon and Schuster. ISBN 978-0-684-86442-6.
- Bowles, Hamish; Schlesinger (Jr.) Arthur Meier; Mellon, Rachel Lambert, eds. (2001). "Defining Style: Jacqueline Kennedy's White House Years". Jacqueline Kennedy: The White House Years. New York: Metropolitan Museum of Art. ISBN 978-0-821-22745-9.
- Butler, Joseph T.; Johnson, Kathleen Eagen; Skibinski, Ray (1985). Field Guide to American Antique Furniture. New York: Henry Holt. ISBN 978-0-805-00124-2.
- Cassini, Oleg (1995). A Thousand Days of Magic: Dressing Jacqueline Kennedy for the White House. Rizzoli International. ISBN 978-0-847-81900-3.
- Clinton, Hillary (2000). An Invitation to the White House: At Home with History. New York: Simon & Schuster. ISBN 0-684-85799-5.
- Facts on File (1977). The World Almanac and Book of Facts. New York: Newspaper Enterprise Association.
- Israel Sack, Inc. (1974). American Antiques From the Israel Sack Collection. Volume IV. Washington, D.C.: Highland House Publishers.
- Monkman, Betty C. (2000). The White House: The Historic Furnishings and First Families. Washington, D.C.: White House Historical Association. ISBN 0-789-20624-2.
- Office of the Chief Usher (1989). The White House: The Ronald W. Reagan Administration, 1981-1989 (Report). Washington, D.C.: The White House. hdl:2027/umn.31951002966827o.
- Phillips-Schrock, Patrick (2013). The White House: An Illustrated Architectural History. Jefferson, N.C.: McFarland & Company. ISBN 978-0-786-47152-2.
- Pitch, Anthony (2008). "They have killed Papa dead!": The Road to Ford's Theatre, Abraham Lincoln's Murder, and the Rage for Vengeance. Hanover, N.H.: Steerforth Press. ISBN 978-1-586-42163-2.
- Smith, Jean Edward (2007). FDR (PDF). p. 335. ISBN 978-1-588-36624-5.
- Sidey, Hugh (September 1, 1961). "The First Lady Brings History and Beauty to the White House". Life. pp. 54–65.
- Thayer, Mary Van Rensselaer (1967). Jacqueline Kennedy, the White House Years. Boston: Little, Brown and Company.
- White House Historical Association (2001). The White House: An Historic Guide. Washington, D.C.: White House Historical Association. ISBN 978-0-912-30817-3.
- Willets, Gilson (1908). Inside History of the White House: The Complete History of the Domestic and Official Life in Washington of the Nation's Presidents and Their Families. New York: The Christian Herald.
