= Spencer Overton =

American lawyer (born 1968)

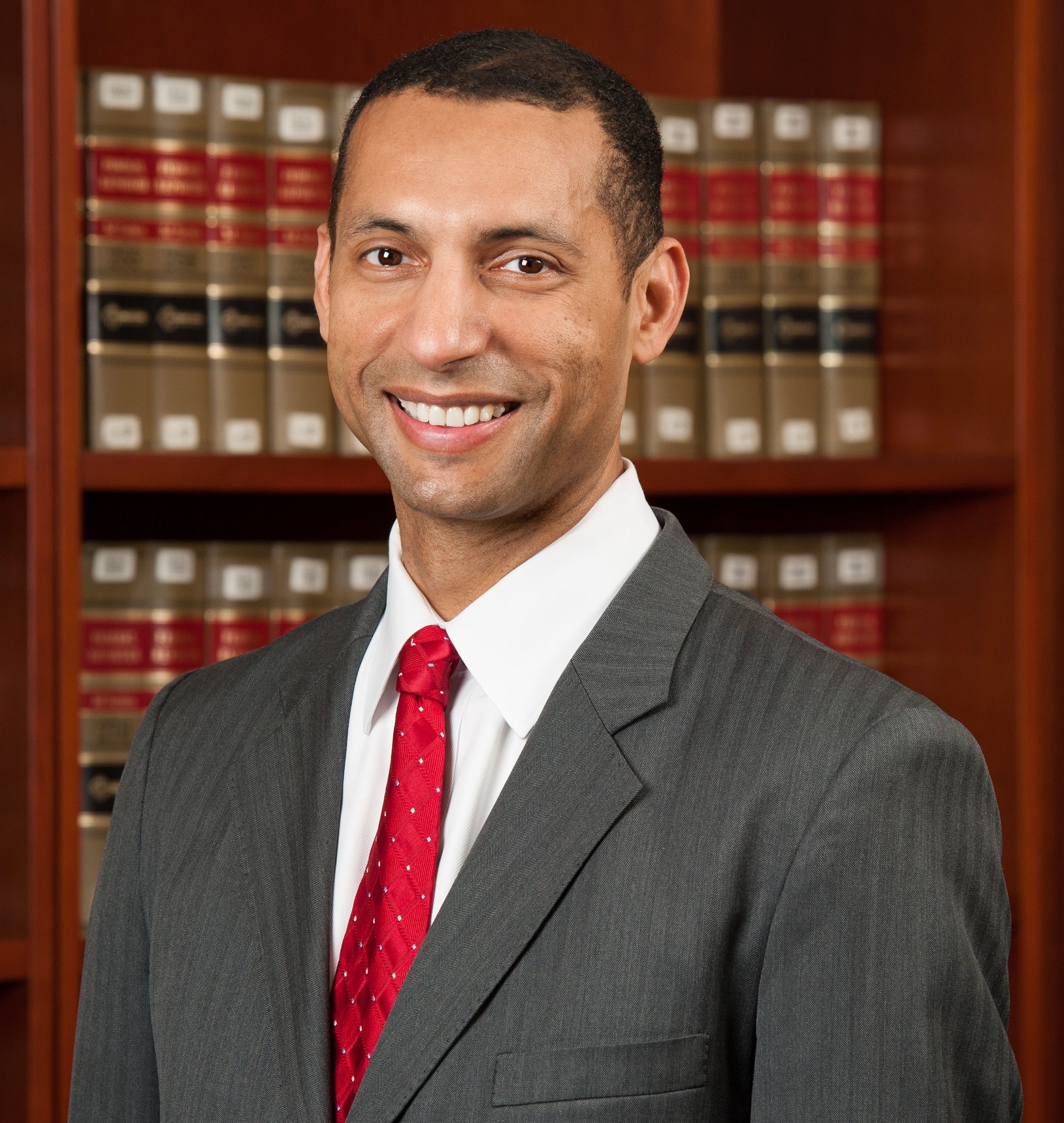
- Born: August 11, 1968 (age 58); Detroit, Michigan, U.S.
- Education: Hampton University (BA); Harvard University (JD)
- Occupations: Former President of Joint Center for Political and Economic Studies; Law professor Author; Political commentator
- Spouse: Leslie Overton

Spencer A. Overton (born August 11, 1968) is an American lawyer, former president of the Joint Center for Political and Economic Studies, and law professor at George Washington University Law School. He is an election law scholar, and is a tenured professor of law at George Washington University.

== Early life and education ==
Overton was born in Detroit, Michigan. He graduated from Southfield High School. He has one sibling, Cynthia A. Overton, a research analyst at the American Institutes for Research.

Overton received his Bachelor of Arts degree with highest honors from Hampton University in 1990, with a major in mass media and journalism. He received his J.D. cum laude from Harvard Law School in 1993.

== Legal and political career ==
After graduating from Harvard Law School, Overton was a law clerk to Judge Damon Keith of the United States Court of Appeals for the Sixth Circuit in Detroit from 1993 to 1994. He practiced law with the firm of Dickinson, Wright, Moon, Van Dusen & Freeman in Detroit from 1994 to 1996. He practiced at Debevoise & Plimpton, in Washington, D.C. from 1997 to 2000. Overton has been admitted to the Maryland, Michigan, and Washington, D.C. bars.

Overton became interested in election law when he served as counsel to the NAACP Legal Redress Committee. He drafted legal memoranda and testified before the judiciary committees of the Michigan House of Representatives and Senate regarding the application of the Voting Rights Act of 1965 to the proposed merger of Detroit Recorder's Court with Wayne County Circuit Court. His interest deepened when, as a lawyer at Debevoise & Plimpton, he represented the Democratic National Committee in the Lincoln Bedroom for contributors controversy and White House Coffee campaign finance investigations by Congress and the Department of Justice.

From 1999 to 2000, Overton was a Charles Hamilton Houston Fellow at Harvard Law School in Cambridge, Massachusetts where he wrote "Mistaken Identity: Unveiling the Property Characteristics of Political Money," an article analyzing property theories and campaign finance law.

From 2000 to 2002, Overton taught law at the University of California, Davis School of Law.

Overton served as on the Carter-Baker Commission on Federal Election Reform at the American University Center for Democracy and Election Management (CDEM) from May–September 2005. He dissented from the commission's final recommendations, taking issue with the Real ID proposal. Overton wrote that this recommendation for voter identification was "more extreme than any ID requirement adopted in any state to date" and was "so excessive that it would prevent eligible voters from proving their identity with even a valid U.S. passport or a U.S. military photo ID card," stating that "the Commission's Report fails to undertake a serious cost-benefit analysis. The existing evidence suggests that the type of fraud addressed by photo ID requirements is extraordinarily small and that the number of eligible citizens who would be denied their right to vote as a result of the Commission's ID proposal is exceedingly large."

Overton, a Democrat, has served on the National Governing Board of Common Cause in Washington, D.C.; in 2006 he became the chair of the board's policy committee. Overton also serves on the governance committee of Common Cause. Overton served on the boards of Demos and OpenSecrets.

Overton served on the Democratic National Committee (DNC) Commission on Presidential Nomination Scheduling and Timing in Washington, D.C., from February to December 2005. On the Commission he led effort to encourage Iowa to restore voting rights to citizens who had completed their sentences; In July 2005, Governor Tom Vilsack restored voting rights to 98,000 Iowans who had completed their sentences.

Overton is a top bundler for Barack Obama, bundling more than $500,000.

In early 2009, Overton was appointed Principal Deputy Assistant Attorney General in the Office of Legal Policy in the Department of Justice.

In 2005, Overton co-founded, with Professor Paul Butler, Blackprof.com, a blog of "race, culture, and society" mainly written by black academics. Overton now is a "Contributor Emeriti" on the blog.

Overton is a frequent media commentator in print, radio, and television. He is often sought after for analysis of voting rights, election reform, and campaign fundraising.

Overton's achievements have earned him several awards including the Diverse Issues in Higher Education Magazine Emerging Scholars Award in January 2006, which recognizes ten emerging scholars in America, and the Association of American Law Schools' Minority Section's Derrick Bell Award, for its "most promising junior faculty member," in 2004. In 2003, Overton was recognized in Black Enterprise Magazine as one of nine people who "may conceivably end up leading a major black empowerment organization." In 2003, Overton was elected to the Common Cause National Governing Board.

== Writings ==
Overton's academic writings have appeared in the Michigan Law Review, University of Pennsylvania Law Review, UCLA Law Review, Harvard Civil Rights-Civil Liberties Law Review, Election Law Journal, Vanderbilt Law Review, Florida State University Law Review, North Carolina Law Review, Texas Law Review, and Washington and Lee Law Review. He is a member of the editorial board of the Election Law Journal in Los Angeles.

Overton wrote Stealing Democracy: The New Politics of Voter Suppression, on voter suppression and manipulation of election laws in the United States.

== Personal life ==
Overton lives with his wife Leslie C. Overton, who is also a lawyer, and their children in Chevy Chase, Maryland, in the Washington metro area. Leslie Overton specializes in antitrust law and has worked for the United States Department of Justice Antitrust Division, as well as in private practice.
