= Margaret Simms =

21st-century economist

- Born: 1946 (age 79–80); St. Louis, Missouri, U.S.
- Education: Carleton College (BA); Stanford University (MA, PhD)

Margaret Constance Simms (born 1946 in St. Louis, Missouri) is a 21st-century American economist whose work focuses on the economic well-being of African Americans.

She earned her BA in economics from Carleton College in 1967. She earned her MA (1969) and PhD (1974) from Stanford University.

Simms has done research and held leadership positions at institutions including the Joint Center for Political and Economic Studies, and the Urban Institute, and has served as a policy advisor to the federal government.

She received the Samuel Z. Westerfield Award honoring the achievement of African-American economists in 2009, the second woman to do so.

== Early life ==
Margaret C. Simms was born 1946 in St. Louis and spent the majority of her early life there, growing up with two significantly older brothers. Both of her parents were college-educated and many of her relatives were academics who worked for a variety of universities across the country. She attended a segregated school until 5th grade; her middle and high schools were integrated. In contrast to her brothers' high school experience, where a mostly Black teaching and counseling staff maintained high expectations for their students, Simms's high school employed a predominantly white faculty and staff who did not encourage students to pursue higher education and did not have high expectations for Black students.

Nevertheless, she attended Carleton College in Minnesota, a liberal institution with students who strongly supported the civil rights movement throughout her time there. Out of approximately 1,400 students, there were only 4 Black students her first year on campus. Around 40% of the students were women. Upon matriculation, Simms intended to major in chemistry or physics, influenced by her personal success in those subjects in high school and family partiality toward the sciences, but found these subjects difficult to relate to life and career after college and decided to explore other options. She found an interest in economics while taking courses to fulfill distribution requirements. In that department, all of her professors were white, and only one other economics major was Black. Some of her professors and 20% of her fellow economics majors were women; being a female economist was not controversial. Simms graduated with a BA in economics in 1967.

The summer after her junior year, Simms participated in the Foreign Affairs Scholars Program, an initiative to diversify the US Foreign Service; a majority of each cohort was Black. One of the program's offerings was a year of graduate school with fellowships, inducing Simms to apply for graduate school.

After graduation, Simms moved to California for a PhD in economics at Stanford University. When she arrived at Stanford, Simms the only African American student and one of few women; only one African-American had completed Stanford's economics PhD program and no woman had. Simms had no mentors within the department; while she did not encounter blatant obstacles, there was some consensus among her graduating cohort that the environment was not supportive. During her first year at Stanford, Martin Luther King was assassinated. This event and its consequential riots ultimately lead her to shift her focus to domestic issues and policies, despite her involvement with the State Department through the Foreign Affairs Scholar Program. She obtained her MA in 1969 and her PhD in 1974.

== Career ==
=== Academia ===
Before she finished her PhD dissertation, Simms began teaching at the University of California, Santa Cruz. She then spent several years teaching at Atlanta University, a historically black college and university (renamed Clark-Atlanta University after it merged with Clark College.) Here, she found mentorship through the Caucus of Black Economists, (which became the National Economic Association). She also gained administrative experience as chair of the economics department. Simms was on the faculty of Atlanta University from 1972 to 1981, eventually working her way up to be the chair of the economics department. During that time, she took leave for a fellowship program from 1977 to 1978 and again for two years to conduct policy research at the Urban Institute.

=== Research ===
In 1977, she participated in the Brookings Institution's Economic Policy Fellows program, where she worked in the Office of Policy Development and Research at the United States Department of Housing and Urban Development (HUD), returning to Atlanta University for a year. In 1979, she moved to Washington, DC to work at The Urban Institute.

From 1979 to 1986, Simms conducted research at The Urban Institute, starting as a senior research associate, and eventually becoming the program director of the Minorities and Social Policy Program. Here, she had opportunities to conduct research about the well-being of Americans and advise government leaders based on the research results.

She then moved on to work at the Joint Center for Political and Economic Studies (JCPES) from 1986 to 2007, the top think tank of African American policy, where she was hired to be the deputy director of research. Since its founding in 1970, its mission has been to assist Black candidates to become elected officials and to equip them with networks of resources once they have been elected. Now, it serves as a forum for policy debates and ideas that promote the advancement of Black communities. During her tenure, she served as the first woman vice president of governance and economic analysis; she also served as vice president for research and interim president of the entire organization.

In 2007, Simms returned to The Urban Institute as an institute fellow and director of the Low Income Working Families Project. From 2007 to 2018, she oversaw a team that analyzes factors that result in poor outcomes for American families living below 200% of the federal poverty level and makes policy recommendations that would improve their outcomes. Since her retirement as director in 2018, she has remained involved with The Urban Institute as a non-resident fellow.

=== Select bibliography ===
- Slipping Through the Cracks: The Status of Black Women (1986)
  - This volume, originated as a paper presented for a symposium on the economic status of Black women focuses on factors that lead Black women to unfavorable economic outcomes and programs that can alleviate these inequities.
- The Economics of Race and Crime (1988)
  - This book was at the frontier of research examining the relationship between crime and the economy, particularly about the link between employment and incarceration, and how Black people are systematically disadvantaged through these institutions.
- Economic Perspectives on Affirmative Action (1995) (edited by Margaret Simms)
  - This book examines the economic costs of racially discriminatory economic practices and equal opportunity policies to the national economy and to demographic groups.

== Impact of work ==
Though she has experience in a variety of roles ranging from teaching to researching, she feels that the majority of her career has been most impactful in building (particularly Black) institutions. As the president of the National Economic Association in 1979, she assisted in reorganizing the institution, elevating it to a higher level. She also served as editor of the Review of Black Political Economy, the National Economic Association's scholarly journal, for five years, in which she improved its financial stability and established a calendar, including reoccurring special issues. As vice president for research at the Joint Center for Political and Economic Studies, she implemented a strategic planning process. She has also served as a board and committee member to a plethora of institutions, including the Institute for Women's Policy Research and the Bureau of Labor Statistics Data Users Advisory Committee.

Throughout her career, Simms has also served as a consultant to many government and nonprofit organizations, advising them on effective policies to close equity gaps disadvantaging minorities. In 1978, she consulted for The National Urban League, an organization empowering Black Americans economically to achieve racial equity. In 1979, she consulted for the United States National Institute of Education, which published recommendations on improving education policy across the country. More recently, she has consulted or advised for the United States Department of State, the Peter G Peterson Foundation, and the Russell Sage Foundation, among others. She also served on many committees developing policy recommendations for the government, including the National Research Council Committee on the Fiscal Future of the United States.

== Awards, honors, and nominations ==
Simms has received many awards and elections for her work, including the election to the American Academy of Arts and Sciences in 2005 and the National Academy of Social Insurance. She was the second woman to be awarded the Samuel Z. Westerfield Award in 2009, presented by the National Economic Association, which honors the public service and scholarly achievement of African American economists. She received the award in recognition of her outstanding contributions to scholarship, institutional leadership and service. In 2010, she was awarded an Honorary Doctors of Laws Degree by Carleton College where she earned her bachelor's degree. In 2019, she was elected as a fellow to the National Academy of Public Administration.
