= Eddie Williams (activist) =

American activist and government official (1932–2017)

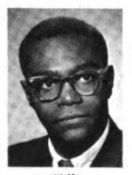
- Born: August 18, 1932; Memphis, Tennessee
- Died: May 8, 2017 (aged 84); Bethesda, Maryland
- Education: University of Illinois

Eddie Williams (August 18, 1932 - May 8, 2017) was an activist and government official.

== Early life and career ==
Eddie Nathan Williams was born in Memphis, Tennessee on August 18, 1932 to Edie Williams, a jazz pianist, and the former Georgia Lee Barr. His father died when he was young and he was raised by his mother. He graduated from the University of Illinois with a bachelor's in journalism in 1955. After graduation, Williams attempted to get a job at the Champaign-Urbana Courier where he'd worked part time during his education but the paper's owner refused to hire African Americans. Williams instead worked for the Memphis Star-Times and the Atlanta Daily World, both Black newspapers.

Williams joined the US Army in 1955 and was discharged in 1957 after having reached the rank of first lieutenant. Williams then joined the State Department in 1961 as the first Black protocol officer. He also worked under Senators Edward M. Kennedy and Hubert Humphrey. He became the Director of the Center for Policy Studies at the University of Chicago in 1968.

Williams served as the President of the Joint Center for Political and Economic Studies from 1972 to 2004. During this time, he transformed it into the focal point of political thought and research within the black community along with the creation of an inventory of 10,000+ Black Elected Officials. Williams also helped with the creation of the National Coalition on Black Civic Participation. He also founded Focus Magazine as a way to develop a space for black officials, activists, academics etc. throughout the country to work together.

== Personal life ==
Williams married his wife, Jearline Franklin, in 1982. They had three children: Larry Williams, Traci Lynne Williams, and Terence Reddick. He died in 2017, aged 84, in Bethesda, Maryland.

== Awards and recognition ==
Williams has received several awards including:

- Congressional Black Caucus Adam Clayton Powell Award (1982)
- The MacArthur Foundation Fellowship (1988)
- Washingtonian of the Year Award (1991)
- National Black Caucus of State Legislators Nation Builder Award (1992)
- The Louis E. Martin Great American Award (2015)

National Journal political magazine once named Eddie N. Williams as one of the 150 people outside government who wield the greatest influence in Washington, D.C.
