= Joint Center for Political and Economic Studies =

American think tank

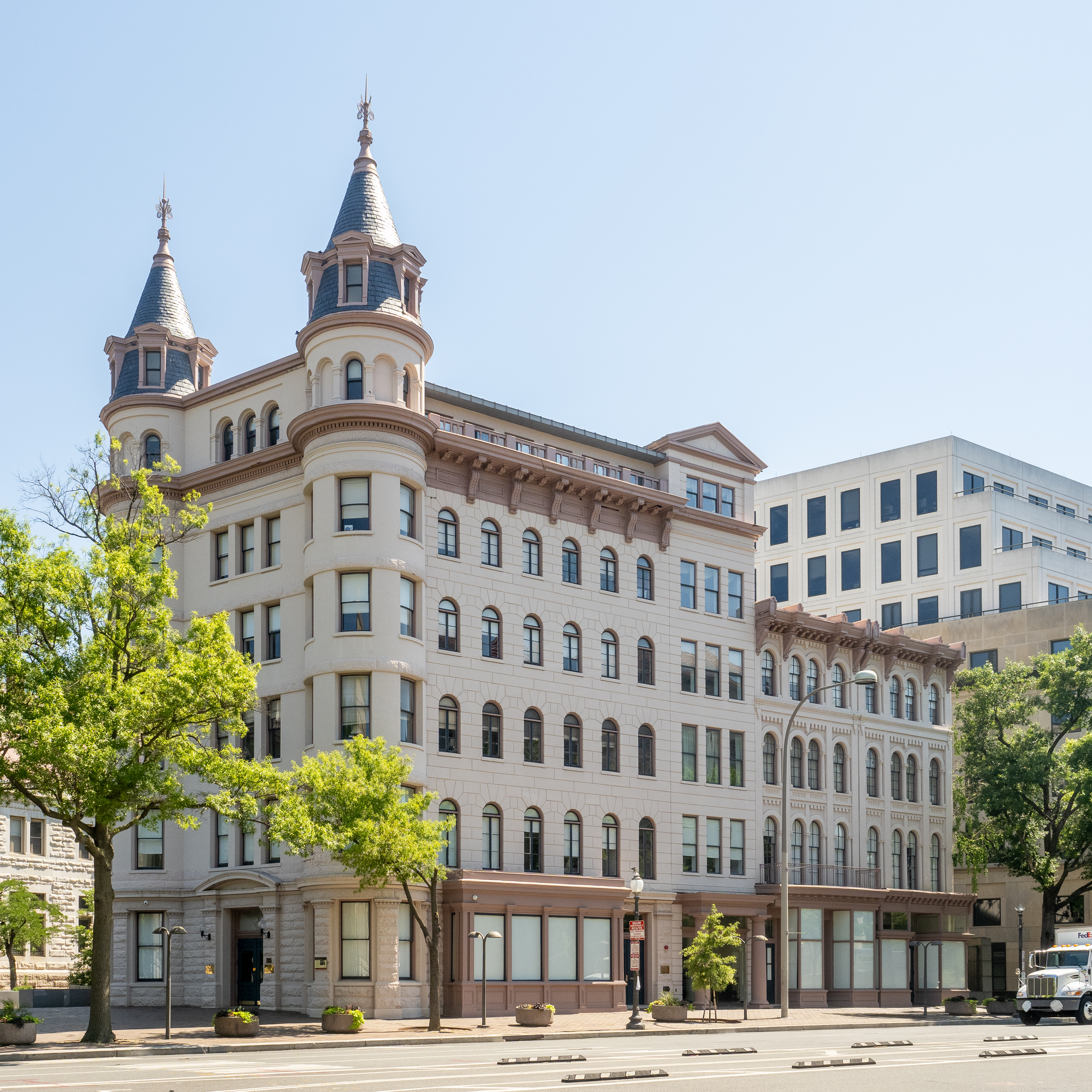
- The Joint Center is located in the Dorothy I. Height Building in Washington, D.C.
- Abbreviation: The Joint Center
- Formation: 1970; 56 years ago
- Founder: Kenneth B. Clark, Louis E. Martin, Frank Reeves
- Type: Public policy think tank
- Tax ID no.: 52-1069070
- Headquarters: 633 Pennsylvania Ave NW
- Location: Washington, D.C., U.S.
- President: Dedrick Asante-Muhammad
- Revenue: $3,445,579 (2024, most recent numbers)
- Expenses: $4,034,896 (2024, most recent numbers)
- Website: Official website
- Formerly called: Joint Center for Political Studies

The Joint Center for Political and Economic Studies, originally the Joint Center for Political Studies and also known in abbreviated form as Joint Center, is an American public policy think tank headquartered in Washington, DC. Founded in 1970, the Joint Center was initially formed to provide training and technical assistance to newly elected Black officials. It is now widely recognized as the “oldest” and “premier” Black think tank. Since its inception, the organization has expanded to address a range of public policy and economic issues that are of concern to Black, AAPI, Latine, and Indigenous communities.

== History, achievements, major initiatives ==
=== Origins ===
Following the Voting Rights Act, Black politicians began to enter the political sphere. However, they came into their elected positions at a disadvantage: their white counterparts had an existing network of support, access to university-level research, and knowledge shared within their party, meanwhile many of these new black elected officials, or "BEOs", knew little about the ropes of their new jobs, such as political networking or even standard administration. What's more, they couldn't count on help from their more experienced and better-connected white colleagues to guide them on the formal procedures or unwritten rules.

At two national conferences -- Chicago in 1967 and Washington DC in 1969—BEOs expressed a need for a new organization, one that would provide new BEOs training and assistance that would give them a foothold in the mainstream American political process. In response to the concerns voiced at the conference, President of the Metropolitan Applied Research Center (MARC) Kenneth B. Clark, presidential advisor and “Godfather of Black Politics” Louis E. Martin, and Howard University law professor Frank D. Reeves led a committee in submitting a grant proposal to the Ford Foundation. And their efforts were not in vain: In April 1970 The Joint Center for Political Studies (its original name) was begun with a two-year $860,000 grant from Ford Foundation. The center's name is a reflection of the "joint" efforts of two entities: MARC and Howard University. The two organizations co-sponsored the center from its inception through formation.

Following the formation of the Joint Center, Clark, Martin, and Reeves continued to play a role in its development. Frank D. Reeves served as the center's first executive director, and Louis E. Martin acted as the first board chairman. Along with Martin, Dr. James Cheek, president of Howard University; Dr. Andrew Billingsley, Howard's vice president for academic affairs; Republican Senator Edward W. Brooke from Massachusetts; and Republican attorney Samuel Jackson comprised the first board of the Joint Center.

=== Early years ===
In July 1972, Eddie N. Williams, director of the University of Chicago's Center for Policy Study, became the Joint Center's president. Williams' varied background—he was a former journalist and staff assistant in both the U.S. Senate and U.S. Department of State—positioned him to forge the center into a full-fledged think tank, one that would "identify public policy issues that have implications for [black Americans] ... to be both a center for intellectual discovery and a wellspring of practical knowledge."

Williams expanded the staff, increased the amount and scope of the center's publication, and organized conferences around the country to aid BEOs. Joint Center data and research began to garner attention from legislative and judicial arenas.

In anticipation of the 1976 general elections, the Joint Center formed the National Coalition on Black Voter Participation (now an independent coalition of 80 organizations), which increased voter registration and turnout during a campaign season that put Carter in the White House by a slim margin. In October of the same year, the Joint Center became completely independent from Howard University and MARC, which had both provided oversight since the Joint Center's formation.

As the number of BEOs grew, the center's role changed. The Joint Center helped form the National Conference of Black Mayors and the National Caucus of Black State Legislators, which began to take on much of the political assistance to black politicians the center had been doing. (The Joint Center also formed the Committee of Policy for Racial Justice around this time.)

By the 1980s the Joint Center's new leadership, including Margaret Simms, who later served as the first female Interim President, realigned the Joint Center’ mission to serve as a full-fledged black think tank for scholarly research on social and economic issues; they believed that the civil rights movement had outgrown reliance on the charismatic leadership of a few individuals. Through that decade and into the next, the Joint Center published extensive research on bars to minority voting and the effects of redistricting on black political power, and increased ties with non-black minority groups.

By the 1990s the Joint Center's research into a range of economic issues – expanding income gaps, the increased role of blacks in the U.S. economy, the condition of young black males and children, the accuracy of the U.S. Census, and the North American Free Trade Agreement – prompted the change to the group's current name. But the group has continued to engage in some political assistance activities, such as providing training to South Africa’s new post-Apartheid political parties.

=== 2000 and after ===
In 2002, the W.K. Kellogg Foundation awarded the Joint Center a $7 million grant to establish the Health Policy Institute, which, Joint Center representatives said, will

- improve the health of black Americans and other minorities and "expand their effective participation in the political and public policy arenas around health issues."
- "identify and promote effective solutions to the problem of health disparities."
- "inform members of Congress and national organizations on [health] issues."

In February 2014, the Joint Center appointed Spencer Overton, a George Washington University Law Professor, as interim president and chief executive officer. Dedrick Asante-Muhammad is the group's current president.

== Presidents ==
- Dedrick Asante-Muhammad (2024–present)
- Jessica Fulton (interim president and vice president) (2023–2024)
- Spencer Overton (2014–2023)
- Ralph B. Everett (2007–2013)
- Margaret Simms (interim president) (2006–2007)
- Togo D. West Jr. (2004–2006)
- Eddie N. Williams (1972–2004)
- Frank Reeves (1970–1972)

== Louis E. Martin Awardees (in Chronological Order) ==
The Louis E. Martin Great American Award is the highest honor granted by the Joint Center, named after the first Board chair of the Joint Center who was also one of its key founders. Recipients are listed as follows:

- Governor Wes Moore (2025 recipient)
- Former Joint Center President Spencer Overton (2024 recipient)
- Federal Reserve Governor Lisa D. Cook (2023 recipient)
- Former Secretary of State Colin Powell (2022 recipient)
- Kellogg Foundation CEO La June Montgomery Tabron (2021 recipient)
- Congressman Cedric Richmond (2020 recipient)
- Former Georgia State Representative Stacey Abrams (2019 recipient)
- Former Vice President Kamala Harris (2018 recipient)
- Congresswoman Barbara Lee (2017 recipient)
- Former Secretary of Labor Tom Perez (2016 recipient)
- Former Joint Center President Eddie N. Williams (2015 recipient)
- Senator Cory Booker (2014 recipient)
- Former National Security Advisor Susan Rice (2013 recipient)
- Former Mayor Kasim Reed (2012 recipient)
- Congressman John Lewis (2012 recipient)
- Rev. Jesse L. Jackson Sr. (2011 recipient)
- Dr. Dorothy Height (2010 recipient)
- Former House Majority Whip James Clyburn (2009 recipient)
- Former Chairman of the House Ways and Means Committee Charlie (Charles) Rangel (2008 recipient)
- Former President Bill Clinton (2007 recipient)
- Three Time World Heavyweight Boxing Champion Muhammad Ali (2006 recipient)
- Cofounder of the Joint Center Vernon Jordan (2005 recipient)
- Former President Jimmy Carter (2004 recipient)
