= Lincoln Bedroom for contributors controversy =

1990s American political controversy

The Lincoln Bedroom for contributors controversy was an American political controversy in the 1990s during the Clinton Administration. It refers to the alleged selling of overnight stays in the Lincoln Bedroom in the White House in return for political campaign contributions. It occurred in the context of the larger and somewhat separately focused 1996 United States campaign finance controversy. Despite allegations of wrongdoing the justice department never opened an investigation or pressed criminal charges in connection to the Lincoln Bedroom matter.

== Origins ==
In August 1996, the Center for Public Integrity released a 10-page report called "Fat Cat Hotel: How Democratic High-Rollers Are Rewarded with Overnight Stays at the White House". This report, written by Margaret Ebrahim, went on to win an award from the Society of Professional Journalists. The report was an examination of the connection between overnight stays in the Lincoln Bedroom during the Presidency of Bill Clinton and financial contributions to the Democratic Party as well as to the Bill Clinton presidential campaign, 1996.

== Revelations ==
In response, documents were released by the Clinton administration in February 1997. These showed that during the period 1993–96, there were 938 people who stayed overnight at the White House, of whom 821 were located in the Lincoln Bedroom. Of these, 128 were public officials and dignitaries of some kind and 67 were people from the arts and entertainment world. The latter group included the likes of Steven Spielberg, Jane Fonda, Judy Collins, and Doris Kearns Goodwin. Of the rest, most were friends of the Clintons, of which over half were from the couple's Arkansas days; the number of non-friends who were supporters was some fraction of 111. The one-term total of 938 compared to that of 284 overnight visitors during the four years of the Presidency of George H. W. Bush.

One particular document was seen as potentially damning, a Clinton annotation on a Democratic National Committee memorandum from its finance chair Terry McAuliffe, written regarding names of people who had not been in touch since the Bill Clinton presidential campaign, 1992: "Yes, pursue all 3 and promptly - and get other names of the 100,000 or more [dollar contributors]. Ready to start overnights right away - give me the top 10 list back, along with the 100." A Washington Post report stated that: "Clinton personally authorized a variety of perks for top party contributors, including golf games and morning jogs with him and overnight stays in the Lincoln Bedroom ..." McAuliffe would later refer to this sardonically as "the infamous Lincoln Bedroom Memo".

A CNN report said that just during the years 1995-96, some $5.4 million was given to the DNC by overnight stayers, with 24 of them giving over $100,000. There were also donations made in conjunction with a related perk, White House coffees. Two other benefits sometimes provided to Clintons friends and benefactors were morning jogs with the president and likewise rounds of golf.

Some have asserted that using the Lincoln Bedroom for fundraising may have broken the law due to the fact that federal law prohibits using government property for fundraising.

== Responses ==
In response to the allegations, President Clinton said in February 1997, "I did not have any strangers here. The Lincoln Bedroom was never sold. That was one more false story we have had to endure, and the facts will show what the truth is."

Senator John McCain said of the documents, "It does corroborate what we already suspected and what circumstantially was already known to us, and that is, that the president of the United States, in seeking to raise money for his re-election, was willing to use the Lincoln Bedroom, probably one of the more sacrosanct places in America, in order to gain those financial funds which he felt were necessary. And I'm deeply disappointed and I'm sure the American people will be too."

== Investigations or not ==
Fellow Republican and Senate Majority Leader Trent Lott called for the naming of an Independent Counsel to investigate the matter. However U.S. Attorney General Janet Reno said despite the new revelations such a step was not called for.

The matter became looked into by a probe by Congressional Republicans on the into fundraising matters at the White House. This investigation concluded that the overnights were "an important means by which the DNC raised funds from contributors." It may have been one issued on November 5, 1998 by the United States House Committee on Oversight and Government Reform. Making reference to legal proceedings, Spencer Overton, as a lawyer at Debevoise & Plimpton, represented the Democratic National Committee in the Lincoln Bedroom matter before the Congressional investigators.

No charges were ever brought by the U.S. Department of Justice in connection with the matter. In the words of the Sydney Morning Herald, the bedroom practice was "Unseemly, but not illegal and not entirely unusual."

== Aftereffects ==
First Lady Hillary Rodham Clinton's 2000 book An Invitation to the White House: At Home with History discussed the Lincoln Bedroom in terms of its decorating impact but made no mention of the contributors controversy. In any case, her campaign in the United States Senate election in New York, 2000 featured fundraisers who had partaken of the Lincoln Bedroom or similar accommodations.

The matter came up in the 2000 United States presidential election when the Republican nominee, the Governor of Texas George W. Bush, criticized during a general election debate, "I think they’ve moved that line the buck stops here’ from the Oval Office to … the Lincoln Bedroom." However as it happened, Bush had engaged in a similar practice with visitors to the Texas Governor's Mansion. Furthermore the first year and a half of the Presidency of George W. Bush also saw some instances of big-money contributors staying over at the White House.

When Hillary Clinton ran for senator in 2000, her opponent, Rick Lazio, used the controversy to rebuke Clinton in a debate, saying "please, no lectures from Motel 1600 on campaign finance reform."

During the presidency of Barack Obama, however, the Lincoln Bedroom was off-limits to guests. First Lady Michelle Obama said, "We don’t allow guests to stay in this room anymore."

Many of the original Lincoln Bedroom guests were also big contributors to the Hillary Clinton presidential campaign, 2016.
