= Lincoln Sitting Room =

Room on the White House's second floor

Coordinates: 38.8975°N 77.0362°W

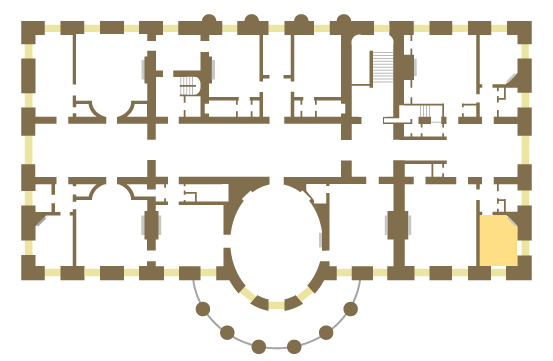
Floor plan of the White House second floor showing location of the Lincoln Sitting Room.

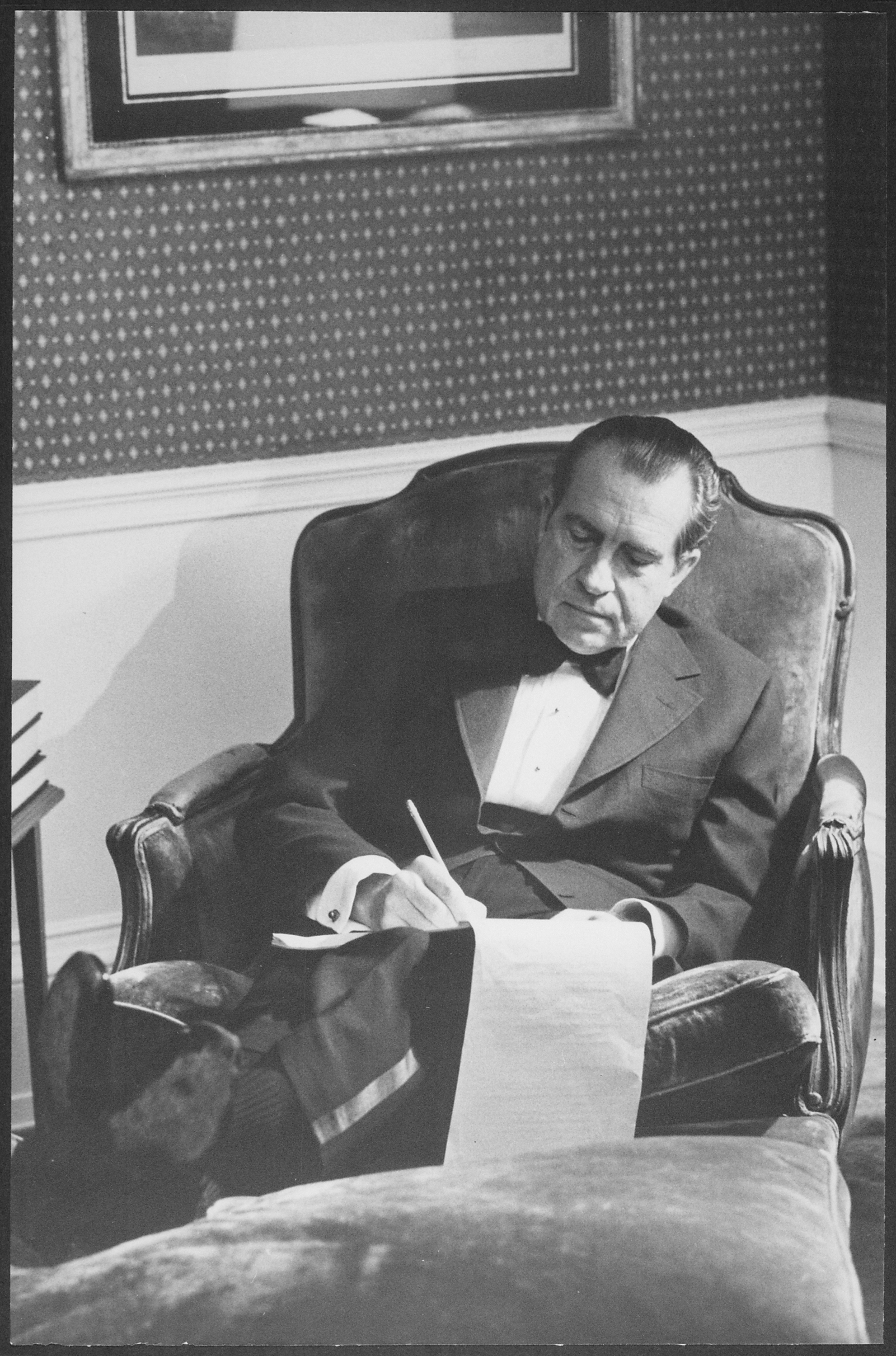
Richard Nixon working in the Lincoln Sitting Room

The Lincoln Sitting Room is a small sitting room located next to the Lincoln Bedroom on the second floor of the White House. It was used as the White House telegraph room from 1865 to 1902 (until the West Wing was built). It is furnished in Victorian style to match the bedroom. The overstuffed sofa and matching chair were formerly furnishings in the Green Room. The Kennedy restoration in 1963 restored it to Victorian style, and it has been maintained in the same style since.

The room became a favorite hideaway of President Richard Nixon, who had it replicated in his presidential library.
