= Louis E. Martin =

American journalist, newspaper publisher, civil rights activist and advisor

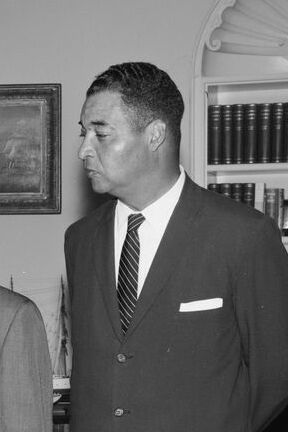
- Martin in 1962

White House Advisor

Personal details
- Born: Louis Emanuel Martin Jr. November 18, 1912 Shelbyville, Tennessee, U.S.
- Died: January 27, 1997 (aged 84)
- Party: Democratic
- Occupation: Newspaper Executive. Political Strategist. Advisor to three Presidents of the United States.

Louis Emanuel Martin Jr. (November 18, 1912 – January 27, 1997) was an American journalist, newspaper publisher, civil rights activist and advisor to three presidents of the United States. Through his political activism during the civil rights era, he came to be known as the "Godfather of Black Politics."

== Early life ==
Louis Emanuel Martin Jr. was born on November 18, 1912, in Shelbyville, Tennessee to Dr. Louis E. Martin Sr. and Willa Martin. Louis Jr. was their only son. He grew up in Savannah, Georgia. His father, a physician of Afro-Cuban ancestry, was a graduate of Meharry Medical College in Nashville, Tennessee. It was there that he met and married the former Willa Hill of nearby Shelbyville.

Dr. Martin moved his family to Savannah when Louis Jr. was four years old, largely because the climate of southeast Georgia reminded him of the sub-tropical climate of his native Santiago, Cuba. It was in Savannah that Louis Jr. later met and married the former Gertrude Scott, a Phi Beta Kappa graduate of Ohio State University. They had five children.

== Newspaper career ==
After first attending Fisk University, Martin graduated from the University of Michigan in 1934, where he earned a Bachelor of Arts in journalism. Following college, Martin traveled to his father's native Cuba, spending two years there as a freelance writer based in Havana. Returning to the United States in 1936, he was hired as a reporter with the Chicago Defender, a major black newspaper published in Chicago, Illinois.

After six months in Chicago, he was asked to return to Michigan to help launch the Michigan Chronicle, a black newspaper, serving as its first editor and publisher. Martin remained at this newspaper for 11 years.

Louis Martin was a founder of the National Newspaper Publishers Association, a group of black newspaper publishers. He was also (in 1970) a founder of the Joint Center for Political and Economic Studies, a research organization in Washington, D.C. providing technical support for black officeholders and scholars. He was its first chairman, serving for eight years.

== Political career ==
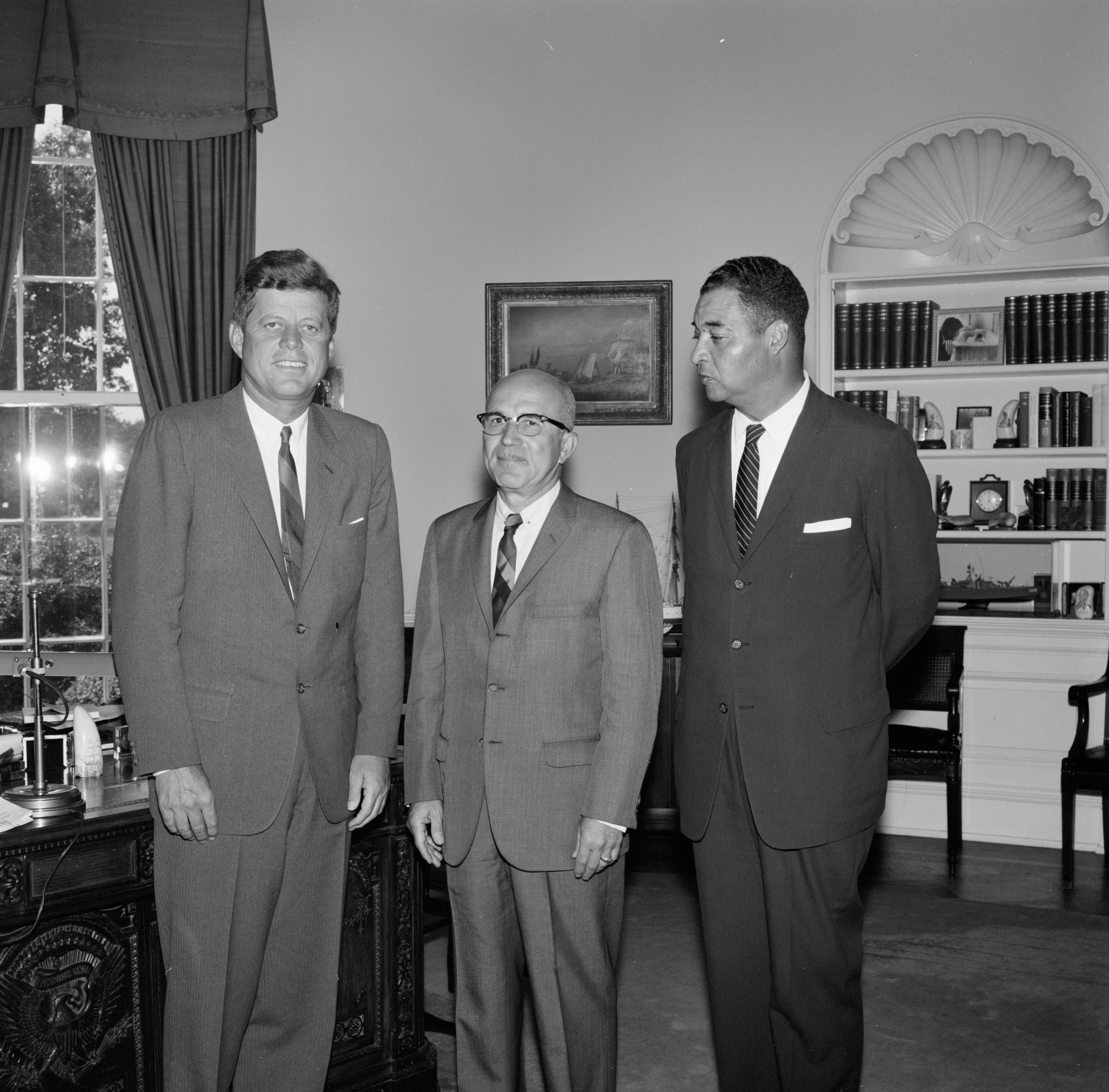
President John F. Kennedy visits with Democratic Congressional candidate from California, Augustus F. Hawkins (center), and Deputy Chairman of the Democratic National Committee, Louis E. Martin (right). Oval Office, White House, Washington, D.C.

Originally recruited by R. Sargent Shriver, Martin joined the 1960 presidential campaign of John F. Kennedy. During the campaign, Martin was instrumental in persuading candidate Kennedy to place a telephone call to Coretta Scott King to express dismay over the jailing of her husband, the Rev. Dr. Martin Luther King Jr. That phone call was credited with helping Kennedy win a major portion of the black vote in the general election that year. It prompted Dr. King's father, the Reverend Martin Luther King Sr., a registered Republican, to vote for Democratic presidential candidate Kennedy.

Following the assassination of president Kennedy in 1963, Martin was among the few close Kennedy advisors to successfully make the transition to the administration of president Lyndon B. Johnson. In 1967, as a trusted advisor, Martin was influential in Johnson's decision to nominate Thurgood Marshall as the first black Justice of the United States Supreme Court. Of his close working relationship with Johnson it was said that "They talked to each other in the shorthand of experienced political pros", according to Clifford Alexander, Special White House counsel and the first African-American Secretary of the United States Army. Secretary Alexander regarded Martin as his mentor. Among the other leading black public figures whom Martin helped raise to prominence was Vernon E. Jordan Jr., later a close adviser to President Bill Clinton. Martin helped recruit Jordan to head the National Urban League.

Eddie Williams, president of the Joint Center for Political and Economic Studies, said it was surprising that Martin was largely unknown to the public at large, given his wide-ranging influence in the White House and his role in the development of black political power in the Democratic Party. "One reason for this is that in Washington, he was the consummate political insider," Williams said. "He traversed the corridors of power for many years without calling attention to himself and his achievements." According to Williams, it was in the Washington Post that Martin was first called the "Godfather of Black politics".

On January 27, 1997, Martin died in Orange, California. He was 84.

== Personal life ==
Martin was a Catholic, a member of Little Flower Catholic Church in Bethesda, Maryland.

== Career timeline ==
- Michigan Chronicle, editor and publisher, 1936–1947
- Chicago Defender, editor-in-chief, 1947–59, editor, 1969–78, columnist, 1987–1997
- Democratic National Committee, deputy chairman, 1960–1969
- Political advisor to President John F. Kennedy, 1960–1963
- Political advisor to President Lyndon B. Johnson, 1963–1968
- Special assistant to President Jimmy Carter, 1978–1981
- Assistant vice president of communications, Howard University, 1981–1987
- Chairman of the board, Calmar Communications, 1981–1997

== Honors ==
=== Awards ===
- National Urban League, Equal Opportunity Award, 1979
- National Newspaper Publishers Association, John B. Russwurm Award, 1980
- Howard University, Communications Award, 1987
- Democratic Party, Larry O'Brien Achievement Award, 1992

=== Honorary degrees ===
- Wilberforce University, 1951
- Harvard, 1970
- Howard University, 1979
- Wesleyan University, 1980

== Notes ==
- In author Alex Poinsett's book Walking with Presidents Louis Martin recounts his first awareness of race and its peculiar significance in American society. His father was napping in a back room of his office when the receptionist rushed in excitedly saying: "You've got to get up. It's a white man!" Jolted awake, Dr. Martin rushed to the front waiting-room. Here, Martin reflects on this event that occurred in 1919 when he was age 7:
  "I always regretted that my old man got up. It struck me that just being a white man made a hell of a lot of difference. It impressed me so much that I became a civil rights advocate at the age of seven. From that time forward, I kept looking for signs and studying people closely as I began to understand how crazy this society is."
- In the foreword to Poinsett's biography of Louis Martin, Vernon Jordan wrote:
  "a testimony to the enthusiasm, wisdom, and optimism with which Louis Martin approached politics. For more than half a century, he was an indefatigable participant in America's political affairs. After helping FDR with reelection in 1944, he went on to serve as advisor and assistant to Presidents Kennedy, Johnson and Carter, and along the way initiated generations of black people into the leadership ranks of the American political system. For me he not only was a teacher and a mentor but remained a steadfast friend and a constant source of inspiration. Louis was always immensely generous with his time, and I - like so many others - knew that I could call him anytime and hear that familiar greeting 'What's up?' by which he meant 'fill me in and let's see what needs to be done'."
