= Lincoln Bedroom =

Room on the White House's second floor

Coordinates: 38.897617°N 77.036363°W

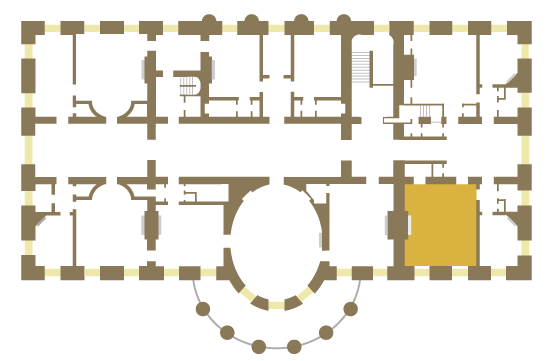
Second floor location of the Lincoln Bedroom

The Lincoln Bedroom is part of a guest suite in the southeast corner of the second floor of the White House in Washington, D.C. The Lincoln Sitting Room makes up the other part of the suite. The rooms are named for President Abraham Lincoln, who used them for his office.

The first room in the White House to carry the name "Lincoln Bedroom" was in the northwest corner of the White House. It existed from 1929 (at which time it was changed from the Prince of Wales Bedroom) until 1961, when First Lady Jacqueline Kennedy transformed it into the President's Dining Room.

== Prior history ==
=== Anonymous bedchambers: 1809–1824 ===
The Lincoln Bedroom and the Lincoln Sitting Room are located in the southeast corner of the Second Floor. As originally designed and completed in 1809, this space contained two very narrow, north–south running bedchambers with a toilet room between them.

=== The President's Office: 1825–1865 ===
By 1825, the toilet had been removed and the bathroom space joined to the west bedchamber to create an office. This area was used for the President's office over the next several decades. Abraham Lincoln used it as both an office and a Cabinet room, and signed the Emancipation Proclamation in the room on January 1, 1863. During the Lincoln presidency, the walls were covered with Civil War military maps. It had dark green wallpaper, and the carpeting was also dark green. Newspapers were stacked on the desk and tables along with large amounts of mail and requests from office seekers. Two large wicker wastebaskets were filled with debris. The east bedchamber in the southeast corner of the house was converted into an office for presidential aides, although President John Tyler used it as part of his office from 1841 to 1845.

=== Late 19th and early 20th century ===
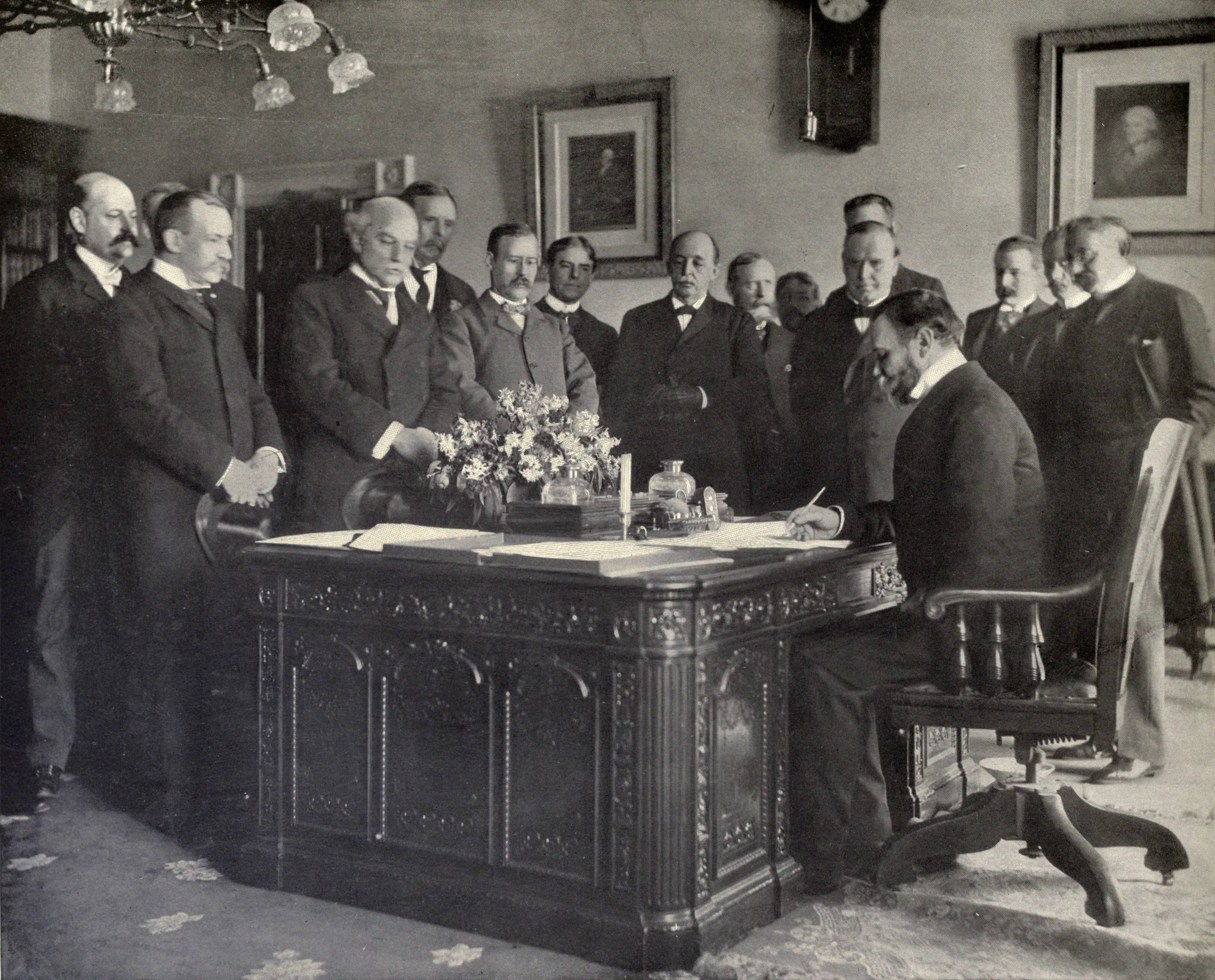
Secretary of State John Hay signs the Treaty of Paris in the room, then an office

During the Franklin D. Roosevelt administration, what would become the Lincoln Bedroom was used by Roosevelt staffer Louis Howe.

=== The Blue Bedroom: 1945–1961 ===
In 1945, newly inaugurated President Harry S. Truman learned that the "President's Office" had once been used by Abraham Lincoln. Truman had the bed, furniture, and other items in the Prince of Wales Room moved into the office. The new bedroom was decorated primarily in blue, and became briefly known as the "Blue Bedroom." The White House underwent a complete reconstruction beginning in 1949, during which the rooms were rebuilt.

== The Lincoln Bedroom: Post-1961 ==
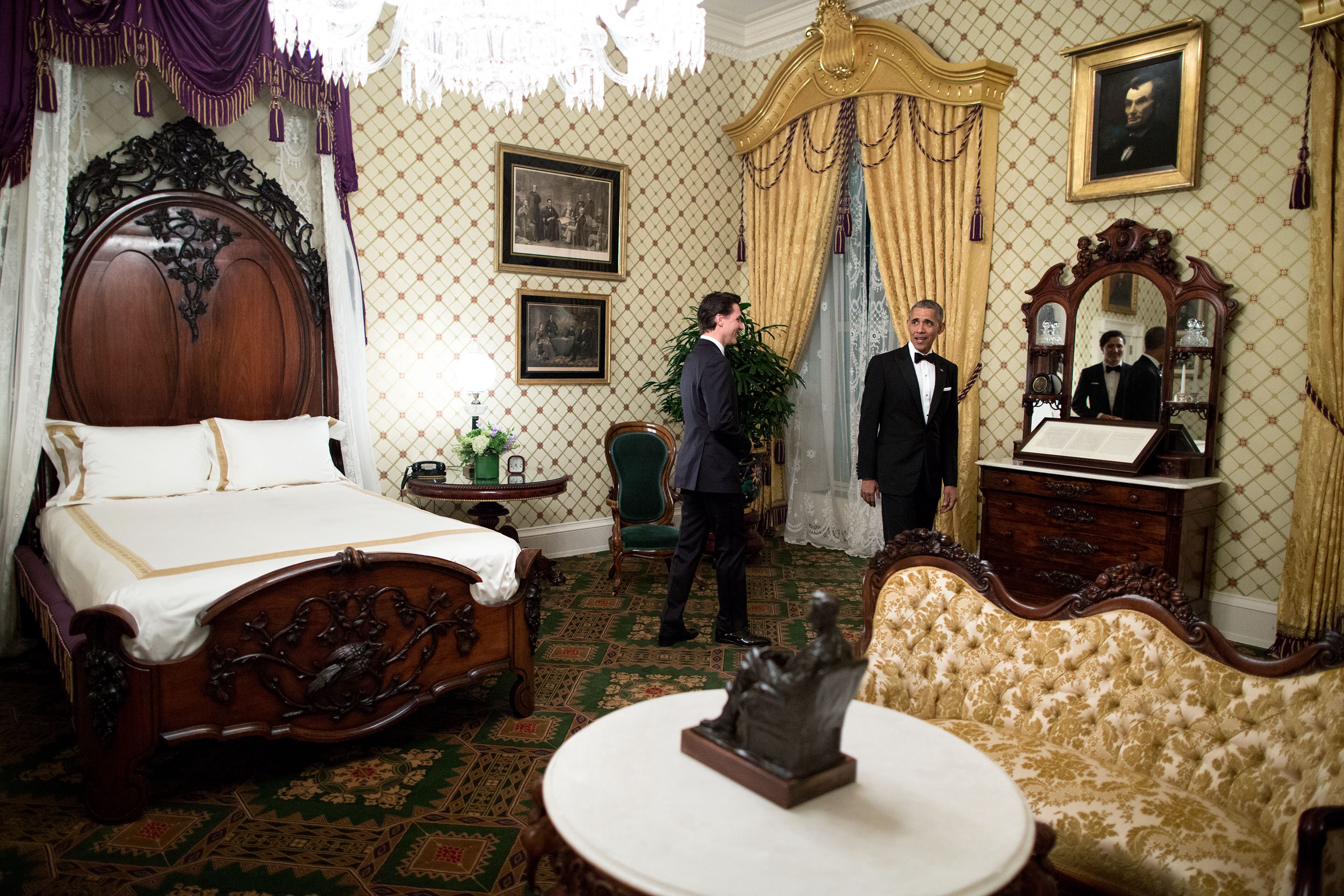
Barack Obama and Justin Trudeau in the bedroom before a state dinner

Jacqueline Kennedy renovated much of the White House during the Kennedy administration, including the Lincoln Bedroom. These changes included adding an unsigned portrait of a Hartford, Connecticut, family in their parlor to what is now known as the Lincoln Bedroom. This unsigned oil painting, dated 1840 to 1850, was donated by the E. and A. Silberman Galleries.

=== Clinton renovation ===
During the Clinton administration the Committee for the Preservation of the White House and then Curator of the White House Betty Monkman began initial assessment for the refurbishment of the room. While most of the furniture and artwork in the room was found to be of similar related periods, and much was associated with the presidency of Lincoln, the room's carpeting, mantel and painted walls were not of the period. Initial decisions were made to replace the existing Neoclassical mantel with a mid-19th-century Victorian style mantel design, and to use more patterns as would have been used in Lincoln's day for the wallpaper and carpet. Two etchings and a drawing from the Lincoln era consistently showed a diamond patterned wallpaper and a Renaissance Revival style gas chandelier existed then in the room. A small oil painting showed a color representation of the same diamond patterned wall paper in dark green, mustard and teal. These were used to create duplicates of the fixtures and furnishings that were installed.

=== George W. Bush renovation ===
During the administration of George W. Bush the new curator, William Allman, along with new Bush appointees to the Committee for the Preservation of the White House, including Bush family decorator Ken Blasingame, continued the process of renovation. A boldly patterned Renaissance Revival patterned carpet was created for the room. The wallpaper became a compromise, using the diamond pattern found in the historic engravings and painting, but eschewing the deep Victorian color palette found in the oil painting for a much lighter off-white color favored by the Bush family in many of the White House rooms they refurbished.

The crown-shaped canopy hood which originally held the canopy of the Lincoln bed was recreated, and the lace and silk and wool velvet bed drapes were accurately recreated, including hand-made fringe and tassels based upon 19th-century photographs. New gilded window valances in the Rococo Revival style were created in place of those shown in engravings, drawings and a painting made during Lincoln's presidency.

=== Trump bathroom renovation ===
On October 31, 2025, news outlets published photos of a 1940s art deco green tile style to black and white polished Statuary marble renovation of the suite's bathroom; no official cost was disclosed, and one independent analysis later estimated a low-to-mid six-figure range for the work.

,

== See also ==
- Lincoln Sitting Room
- Lincoln Bedroom for contributors controversy
- Lincoln's ghost

== Bibliography ==
- Abbott, James A.; Rice, Elaine M. (1998). Designing Camelot: The Kennedy White House Restoration. New York: Van Nostrand Reinhold. ISBN 9780442025328.
- Kalb, Deborah (2013). "Housing of the Executive Branch". In Nelson, Michael (ed.). Guide to the Presidency and the Executive Branch. Thousand Oaks, Calif.: CQ Press. ISBN 978-1568020181.
- Klara, Robert (2013). The Hidden White House: Harry Truman and the Reconstruction of America's Most Famous Residence. New York: Thomas Dunne Books. ISBN 9781250000279.
- Monkman, Betty C. (2000). The White House: The Historic Furnishings and First Families. Washington, D.C.: White House Historical Association. ISBN 0789206242.
- Phillips-Schrock, Patrick (2013). The White House: An Illustrated Architectural History. Jefferson, N.C.: McFarland & Company. ISBN 9780786471522.
