= Presidential Walk of Fame =

Gallery of presidential portraits in the West Wing of the White House

Coordinates: 38.8976°N 77.0371°W

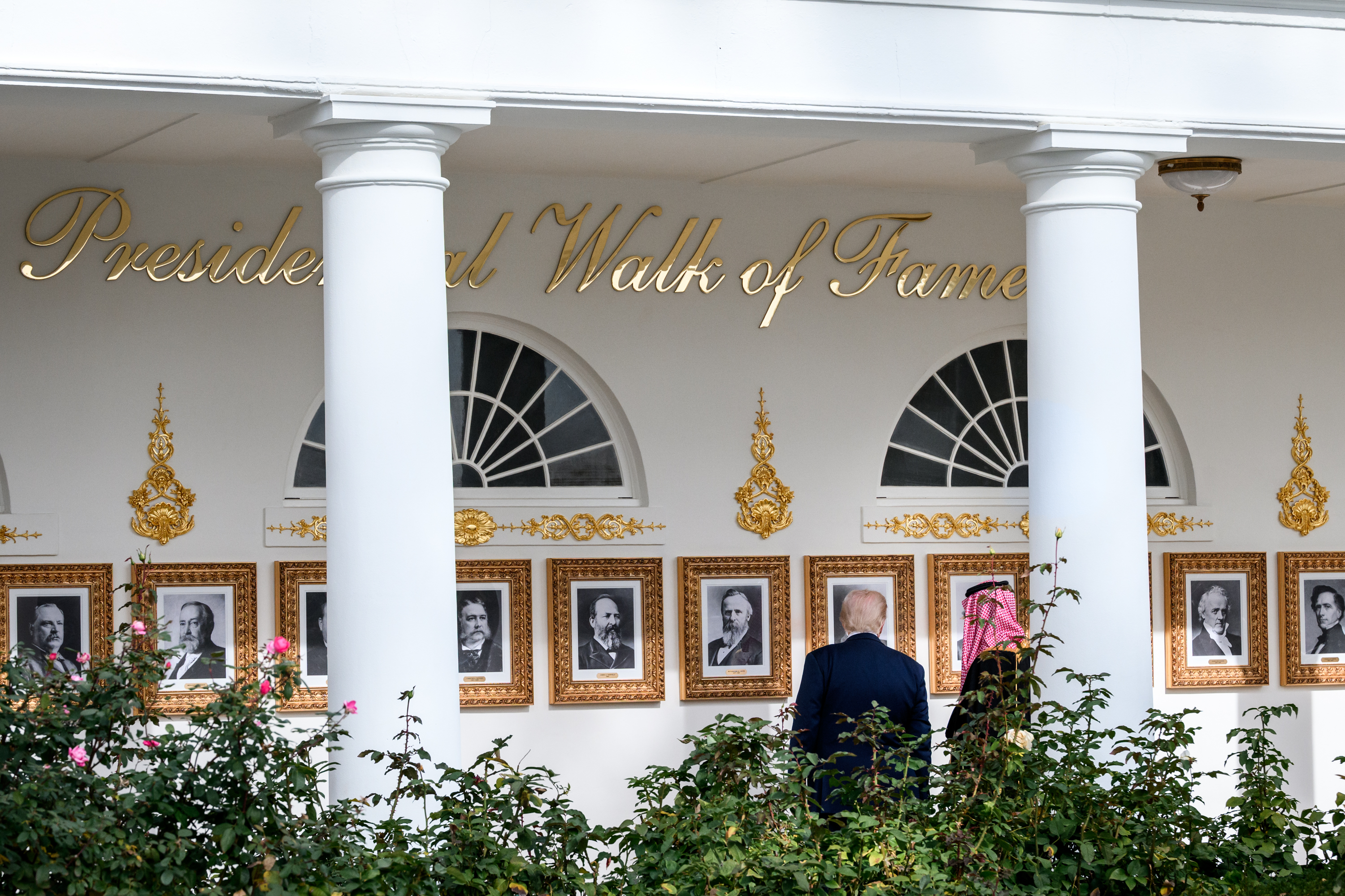
Donald Trump and Saudi crown prince and prime minister Mohammed bin Salman

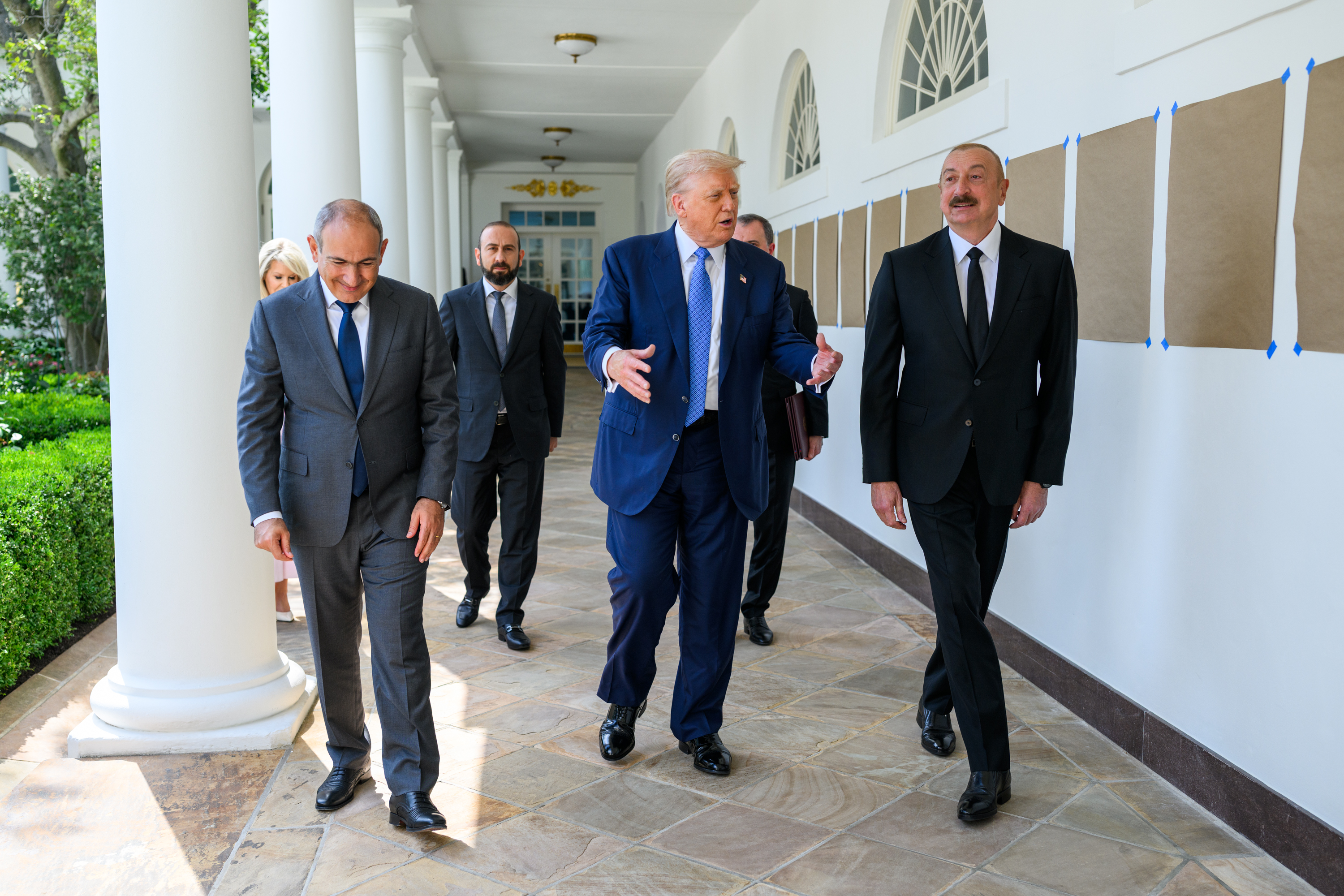
President Trump with the president of Azerbaijan Ilham Aliyev and prime minister of Armenia Nikol Pashinyan along the West Colonnade, one month before the unveiling of the Presidential Walk of Fame

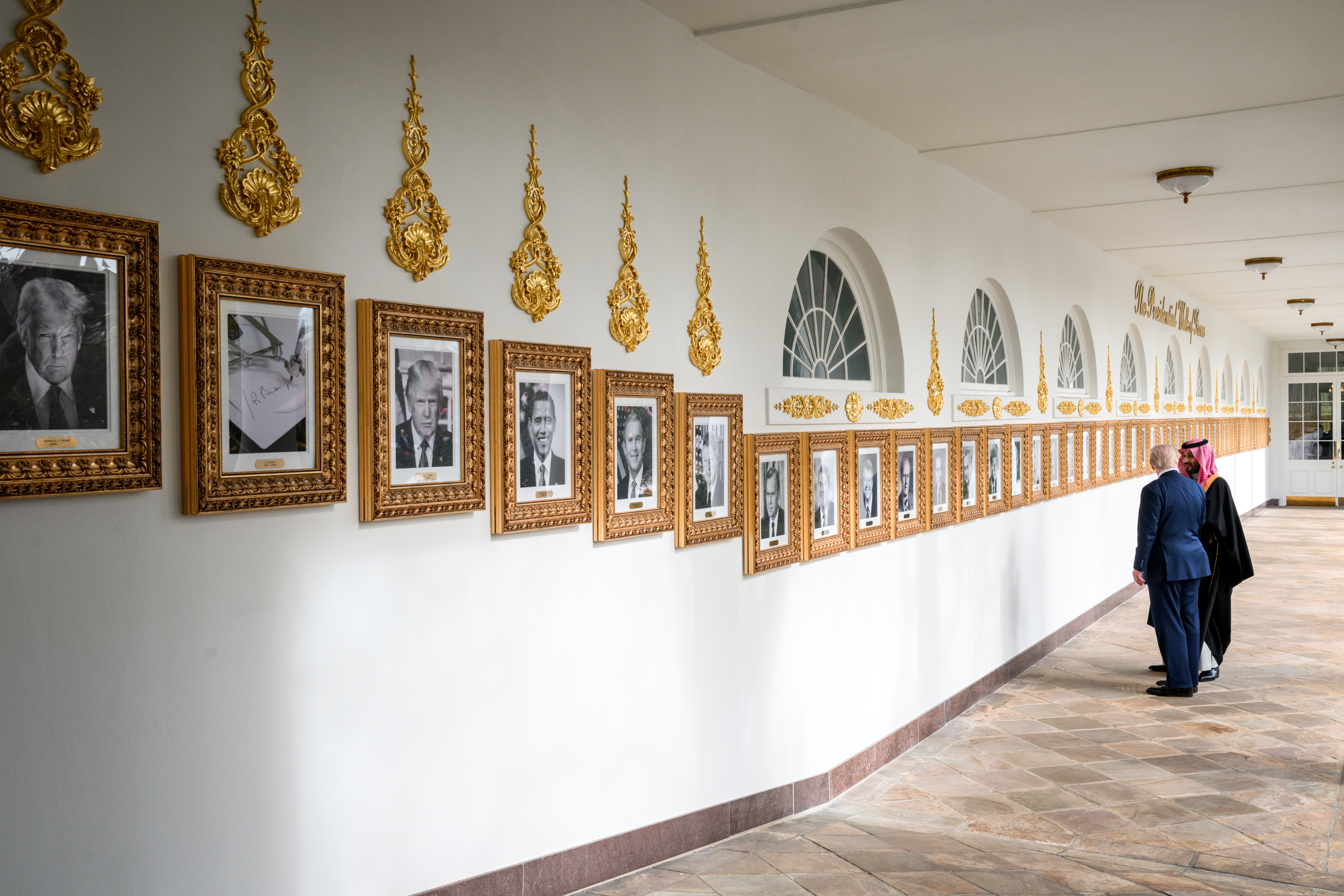
A framed autopen between two photos of Trump

President Trump showing Chinese leader Xi Jinping the Presidential Walk of Fame

The West Wing is connected to the Executive Residence via the West Colonnade.

The Presidential Walk of Fame is a gallery of presidential portraits installed by President Donald Trump along the West Colonnade of the White House in September 2025. Running from the West Wing to the Executive Residence, the display features portraits of every US president in gold frames, with the notable exception of Joe Biden, whose portrait Trump replaced with a photograph of an autopen.

The President stated that the display was inspired by a similar "Wall of Fame" he had seen at a Hilton hotel.

== Background ==
The project was first unveiled in September 2025 and dedicated on 5 November 2025 during Trump's second term. In chronological order, every United States president is displayed via a black and white photograph in a gold frame, except for former president Joe Biden. In the place of Biden's portrait, Trump installed a photograph of an autopen, a device used to mechanically replicate a signature.

In December 2025, the administration added permanent bronze plaques beneath each portrait, many of which were reportedly written or dictated by Trump himself. The descriptions on the plaques vary significantly based on Trump's personal and political assessment of his predecessors:

- Joe Biden: labels Biden "by far, the worst President in American History" and repeats claims regarding the 2020 election and Biden's mental acuity.
- Barack Obama: Labeled "one of the most divisive political figures in American History," the plaque repeats allegations of "spying" on the Trump 2016 campaign.
- George W. Bush: Credits him for the creation of the Department of Homeland Security but criticizes the wars in Afghanistan and Iraq, stating they "should not have happened".
- Bill Clinton: Credits legislative successes to "Republicans in Congress" and mentions that his wife, Hillary Clinton, lost to Trump in the 2016 election.
- Ronald Reagan: Highly favorable, describing him as "The Great Communicator" and claiming that Reagan "was a fan of President Donald J. Trump long before" the latter's political career began.
- Herbert Hoover: Refers to him as a "Great Humanitarian" and a key director of the relief efforts of the Great Mississippi Flood of 1927. Mentions his mining background and the 1929 stock market crash

== Reception ==
White House Press Secretary Karoline Leavitt described the plaques as "eloquently written descriptions" that serve as a "testament to the Greatness of America".

Critics and groups such as the National Trust for Historic Preservation have criticized the installation, alongside other 2025 renovations like the demolition of the East Wing for a planned state ballroom, as an attempt to politicize the historic fabric of the White House.

== Plaques ==
The full, unaltered text of each plaque on the Presidential Walk of Fame is shown in the table below. Many of the plaques contain false or misleading statements.

Presidential Walk of Fame
Plaque No.	Caption	Text
The Presidential Walk of Fame was conceived, built, and dedicated by President Donald J. Trump as a tribute to past Presidents, good, bad, and somewhere in the middle, who served our Country, and gave up so much in so doing. The Presidential Walk of Fame will long live as a testament and tribute to the Greatness of America! Dedicated on November 5, 2025
1	George Washington	The "Father of His Country," George Washington was Commander-in-Chief of the Continental Army during the Revolutionary War, President of the Constitutional Convention, and the first President of the United States. In that role, he established the Cabinet system, the First Bank of the United States, and Washington, D.C., as the Nation's Capital. He kept our young Nation out of War, and instituted Tariffs to encourage American Industry. In his famous Farewell Address, he urged Americans to avoid entangling alliances abroad, and to foster Religion, Morality, and Unity at home. He is one of the Greatest Americans to ever live and, likewise, was a Great President.
2	John Adams	John Adams was a leading voice for the Patriot cause at the First and Second Continental Congresses. He played a key role in drafting the Declaration of Independence, and later negotiating the Treaty of Paris, which officially ended the Revolutionary War. Adams was the first Vice President of the United States, before going on to become our second Commander-in-Chief. As President, John Adams strengthened the U.S. Navy, helped establish the Library of Congress, and successfully avoided a dangerous war with France, while defending American Honor and Commerce from French maritime aggression. He and his wife, Abigail, were the first family to occupy the White House in 1800.
3	Thomas Jefferson	As the primary author of the Declaration of Independence, Thomas Jefferson penned the immortal words, "We hold these truths to be self-evident, that all men are created equal," forever changing the course of History. An extraordinarily elegant man, Jefferson served as Virginia Governor, the first Secretary of State, and Vice President. He also founded the University of Virginia, and authored the Virginia Statute for Religious Freedom, a model for the First Amendment. In the White House, President Jefferson approved the Louisiana Purchase, doubling U.S. territory, and sponsored the Lewis and Clark Expedition. He also founded the U.S. Military Academy at West Point, placed an embargo on France and Britain, defeated the Barbary Pirates, and slashed Federal spending.
4	James Madison	The "Father of the Constitution," James Madison spearheaded the drafting of our Nation's most important legal document, and championed the inclusion of the Bill of Rights. He co-authored the Federalist Papers, was one of the most important early Leaders of the U.S. House of Representatives, and served as Secretary of State. As President, he raised Tariffs, established the Second Bank of the United States, and led our Country during the War of 1812. President Madison and his wife, Dolley, were forced to flee Washington during the War when British troops burned down the White House. Ultimately, the United States succeeded in maintaining its Independence.
5	James Monroe	James Monroe was a Founding Father, Veteran of the War for Independence, Governor of Virginia, U.S. Senator, Secretary of State, and Secretary of War. His Presidency was marked by the "Era of Good Feelings," generally regarded as a time of National Unity and Prosperity. He is known for the Monroe Doctrine, declaring that the United States regarded the Western Hemisphere as off limits to outside intervention. President Monroe made one of the Greatest Deals of All Time, the purchase of Florida from Spain!
6	John Quincy Adams	Son of former President John Adams, John Quincy Adams was an accomplished lawyer, legislator, diplomat, and Secretary of State. He crafted the Monroe Doctrine, and negotiated the Treaty of Ghent, ending the War of 1812. As President, Adams significantly increased Tariffs, and envisioned a grand National program of roads, canals, and bridges, often called "The American System." Although many of these internal improvements were blocked by Congress, Adams oversaw construction of many ambitious projects. After his Presidency, "Old Man Eloquent" served in the House of Representatives, where he actively supported the antislavery movement, and creation of the Smithsonian Institution.
7	Andrew Jackson	"Old Hickory" served as a U.S. Congressman, Judge, General, Senator, and Military Governor. Before becoming President, Jackson was best known for leading the victory at the Battle of New Orleans during the War of 1812. Jackson was often called "The People's President" for championing the common man, but was unjustifiably treated unfairly by the Press, but not as viciously and unfairly as President Abraham Lincoln and President Donald J. Trump would, in the future, be. In the White House, he downsized the Federal workforce, expanded Voting Rights, balanced the budget, and dismantled the corrupt Second Bank of the United States. He successfully navigated the Nullification Crisis, and famously declared, "Our Federal Union, it must be Preserved." He remained the unofficial Leader of the Democrat Party long after he left the Presidency, and championed the cause of National expansion.
8	Martin Van Buren	Dubbed the "Little Magician" for his political skill, Martin Van Buren was a self-made lawyer from New York, who became Secretary of State and Vice President under Andrew Jackson. As President, Van Buren shaped the early Democrat Party, and America's two-party system. When the economic Panic of 1837 gripped the Nation during his Presidency, Van Buren cut Government spending, and fought for the Independent Treasury System, separating private and Federal funds for added financial stability. Van Buren also opposed slavery's expansion, blocking annexation of Texas. In 1848, he ran as the candidate for the failed Free Soil Party, a predecessor of the Republican Party.
9	William Henry Harrison	The son of a Founding Father, William Henry Harrison gained fame for defeating a large Native American army in 1811 at the Battle of Tippecanoe, earning him the nickname "Old Tippecanoe." As Governor of the Indiana Territory, he settled land disputes, negotiated treaties, and played a defining role in the Northwest Territories and Upper Midwest. He also served as a Congressman and Senator from Ohio, before becoming the first member of the Whig Party to become President. Harrison had the longest Inaugural Speech in History, yet the shortest Presidency, serving just 31 days before dying of illness.
10	John Tyler	John Tyler served as a member of Congress, Governor, U.S. Senator, and Vice President under William Henry Harrison. After Harrison's death, Tyler assumed the Presidency, setting the precedent of Presidential succession. Tyler was a staunch advocate of Limited Government and Federalism, putting him at odds with the Whig-dominated Congress. Tyler famously declared, "I can never consent to being dictated to," and vetoed National Bank bills, impeded Federal Infrastructure projects, and objected to other Whig priorities. The Whig Party ejected Tyler from the party, and drew up the first articles of impeachment against him. As President, he raised Tariffs, supported Westward expansion, and annexed Texas.
11	James K. Polk	A devoted Jacksonian Democrat, James K. Polk was a Congressman, Speaker of the House, and Tennessee Governor before securing the Democrat nomination for President, and defeating Henry Clay in the General Election. A champion of America's "Manifest Destiny," Polk completed the annexation of Texas, acquired the Oregon territory, and waged and won the Mexican-American War, which secured U.S. control of half a million square miles of territory, including the States of Arizona, California, Utah, Nevada, and parts of Colorado. He died shortly after leaving office, some believe as a result of overexertion as President.
12	Zachary Taylor	Dubbed "Old Rough and Ready," General Zachary Taylor served 40 years in the U.S. Army, before rising to National fame for his success in the Mexican-American War, and his victory at the Battle of Buena Vista. With no prior political experience, he secured the Whig nomination for President, won the General Election, and entered the White House as tensions intensified before the Civil War. Taylor was a Nationalist, dedicated to preserving the Union. He warned those fomenting disunion that he would hang them "with less reluctance than he had hanged deserters and spies in Mexico." He opposed the Compromise of 1850, which included a series of bills designed to address issues related to slavery. Taylor served only 16 months as President before dying of illness.
13	Millard Fillmore	Millard Fillmore was a lawyer, New York Comptroller, member of Congress, and Vice President, before assuming the Presidency upon Zachary Taylor's death. As President, Fillmore supported the Compromise of 1850, which added California as a free State, and established the Fugitive Slave Act. Fillmore strengthened National Infrastructure, and authorized the famous Perry Expedition that opened Trade with Japan. President Fillmore also aggressively held to the Monroe Doctrine, and prevented European powers from annexing Hawaii. He was the last Whig President.
14	Franklin Pierce	Franklin Pierce was a Speaker of the House in the New Hampshire Legislature, Congressman, U.S. Senator, and General in the Mexican-American War. As President, Pierce negotiated the Gadsden Purchase, acquiring what is now part of southern Arizona and southern New Mexico. His Administration strengthened Trade ties with Great Britain and Japan, and sought to acquire Cuba from Spain, but failed. He also signed the Kansas-Nebraska Act into law, which worsened deepening division over slavery, and resulted in the violence of "Bleeding Kansas."
15	James Buchanan	James "Old Buck" Buchanan, was a lawyer, diplomat, and career politician, who served as a member of Congress, U.S. Senator, and Secretary of State, playing a key role in seminal events including the Mexican-American War, and Oregon Boundary Settlement. As President, he contended with the Panic of 1857, a financial crisis that greatly affected the entire Nation. At the same time, the National divide over slavery was worsening. Buchanan supported both Kansas becoming a slave State, and the Supreme Court's pro-slavery Dred Scott decision, which exacerbated tensions. By the time he left office, seven States had seceded from the Union.
16	Abraham Lincoln	Among the greatest American Presidents, Abraham Lincoln was the man who saved the Union, and ended slavery. A successful lawyer, skilled orator, and former member of Congress, Abraham Lincoln won National fame in the celebrated Lincoln-Douglas debates, and his Cooper Union speech of 1860. He was the first Republican ever elected President, and led the Nation through the American Civil War. Lincoln prosecuted the conflict with unyielding determination, and an unflinching dedication to save the Union. During the War, Lincoln issued the Emancipation Proclamation, delivered what is regarded as the greatest speech in American History, the Gettysburg Address, and championed the passage of the 13th Amendment, abolishing slavery. Days after the Confederates surrendered at Appomattox Courthouse, Lincoln was assassinated in Washington, D.C. by John Wilkes Booth. He died a Great President.
17	Andrew Johnson	Andrew Johnson served as a Congressman, Governor, and Senator from the State of Tennessee. During the Civil War, he was the only southern Senator to remain loyal to the Union. Abraham Lincoln selected Johnson as Vice President on a "National Union" ticket in his re-election campaign. As President, Johnson became mired in controversy with Congress over the topics of Reconstruction, and the extent of Executive authority. Congress ultimately impeached him, and came within one vote of removing him from office. Johnson oversaw the purchase of the State of Alaska from Russia for $7.2 Million Dollars. Abraham Lincoln was a very hard act to follow.
18	Ulysses S. Grant	"Unconditional Surrender Grant" was one of the greatest Generals in American History, who led the Union Army to victory in the Civil War, and was the first man since George Washington to hold the rank of General of the Army of the United States. Grant ran for President under the slogan, "Let Us Have Peace," and championed post-Civil War reconciliation and unification. He was one of the great civil rights Presidents of our Nation, championing the cause of free slaves, supporting the passage of the 15th Amendment, and directing the Department of Justice to destroy the original Ku Klux Klan. As he was dying, Grant wrote a best-selling memoir, saving his family from poverty. He died a Great General, but a President whose Administration was tied to much scandal.
19	Rutherford B. Hayes	Rutherford Hayes was a Civil War hero and accomplished General, who was wounded five times in battle. He then became a successful lawyer, Congressman, and Governor of Ohio. His time in the White House was marred by accusations that he had stolen the Presidency from his opponent, Samuel Tilden. As President, Hayes oversaw the end of Reconstruction, began the professionalization of the civil service, and broke the Great Railroad Strike of 1877. In 1880, Queen Victoria gave President Hayes a desk made of timbers from the HMS Resolute, which sits in the Oval Office today.
20	James A. Garfield	An academic, lawyer, skilled orator, and distinguished Military Commander during the Civil War, James Garfield was a respected member of the U.S. House of Representatives, prior to winning his party's Presidential nomination as a dark horse candidate at the Republicans' deadlocked convention. His Presidency was tragically short-lived. On July 2, 1881, President Garfield was shot at a railroad station in the Nation's Capital by a disturbed political office seeker. Two-and-a-half months later, President Garfield passed away.
21	Chester A. Arthur	Known as the "Gentleman Boss," Chester Arthur served as Quartermaster General of the State of New York during the Civil War, and later became the Collector of the Port of New York. Arthur was removed as Collector by President Hayes for his ties to the State's powerful Republican machine. These ties, however, placed Arthur in the Vice Presidency in 1880, and Arthur assumed the Presidency upon President Garfield's death. He surprised critics by championing civil service reform, and signing the Pendleton Civil Service Reform Act, which banned patronage, and mandated merit-based hiring. He also strengthened the Navy, restricted Immigration, and made modest changes to American Tariff policy.
22	Grover Cleveland	The first Democrat to win the Presidency since the Civil War, Grover Cleveland had one of the most rapid political ascents in U.S. History, going from Sheriff of Erie County, to Mayor of Buffalo, to Governor of New York, in the span of just 12 years. Admired for "the enemies he made," Cleveland resisted political favoritism and battled corruption. He also vetoed many spending bills, and became known as the "Veto President." His opposition to Tariffs, and expanded Civil War pensions, likely cost him his re-election.
23	Benjamin Harrison	The grandson of President William Henry Harrison, Benjamin Harrison was a lawyer, Civil War General, and U.S. Senator. As President, Harrison signed the McKinley Tariff of 1890, which applied the highest protective Tariff in American History. President Harrison also signed the Sherman Antitrust Act, the most consequential piece of antitrust legislation in History, along with the Land Revision Act, which created National Forests. President Harrison also established American Samoa, expanded the Navy, and supported the annexation of Hawaii.
24	Grover Cleveland	After his 1892 victory, Grover Cleveland made History as the first President to serve two non-consecutive terms. President Donald J. Trump, 132 years later, would follow suit. In his second term, Cleveland supported the gold standard, prevented the annexation of Hawaii, and authorized the use of Federal troops to end the Pullman Strike. He rigorously enforced the Monroe Doctrine, even threatening Great Britain with war over its Border dispute with Venezuela in 1895. Cleveland's second term was dominated by an economic crisis, due to the Panic of 1893, along with labor disputes.
25	William McKinley	One of the chief architects of American Protectionism, William McKinley famously declared, "I am a Tariff man standing on a Tariff platform." A former Officer in the Union Army, McKinley championed the protective Tariff as an Ohio Congressman, authoring the McKinley Tariff of 1890, which applied the highest protective Tariff in American History. McKinley then served as Governor of Ohio, before being elected President, running under the slogan, "Patriotism, Protection, and Prosperity." As President, McKinley raised Tariffs, annexed Hawaii, and won the Spanish-American War. The successful War with Spain gave the U.S. control of the Philippines, Puerto Rico, and Guam. In 1901, McKinley was tragically assassinated while still in office.
26	Theodore Roosevelt	A scholar, soldier, reformer, and statesman, Theodore Roosevelt charged into the History books with the legendary Rough Riders at the Battle of San Juan Hill. He became the Governor of New York, and was then selected to serve as Vice President. He became President of the United States following the assassination of William McKinley. He dramatically expanded the National Park System, pursued a "Square Deal" for American labor and business, and took unprecedented actions to break up monopolistic trusts. In foreign affairs, he began construction of the Panama Canal, prevented the European invasion of Venezuela, and sent the "Great White Fleet" around the World in a demonstration of American Naval might. He won the Nobel Peace Prize for negotiating an end to the Russo-Japanese War.
27	William Howard Taft	William Howard Taft served as a Judge, Governor-General of the Philippines, provisional Governor of Cuba, and Secretary of War. As President, Taft proved to be a dedicated "trust-buster," initiating 80 antitrust cases. He supported high Tariffs, modernized the State Department, and reformed the U.S. Postal System. President Taft's foreign policy focused on so-called "Dollar Diplomacy," which prioritized expanded market access in the Americas and Asia. After losing re-election, he returned to public service as Chief Justice of the United States Supreme Court, becoming the only person in U.S. History to lead both the Executive and Judicial Branches of Government.
28	Woodrow Wilson	A former President of Princeton University and Governor of New Jersey, Woodrow Wilson was an ardent Progressive. He vastly expanded the role of the Federal Government, re-segregated parts of the Federal workforce, created the Federal Reserve, implemented a progressive Income Tax, and embraced liberal internationalism. He led the Nation during World War I, promising to "make the world safe for Democracy." After the War, Wilson promoted the League of Nations, but failed to receive the necessary support from the U.S. Senate. He suffered a massive stroke, which incapacitated him in his final months in office.
29	Warren G. Harding	A former newspaper publisher, Lieutenant Governor of Ohio, and U.S. Senator, Warren Harding ran for President promising "to safeguard America first, to stabilize America first, to prosper America first, to think of America first, to exalt America first, to live for and revere America first." To return the Nation to normalcy and prosperity in the midst of a post-World War I economic recession, President Harding cut Taxes, raised Tariffs, and restricted Immigration. His Administration also radically cut Federal spending, created the Veterans' Bureau, and hosted the Washington Naval Conference, which helped establish U.S. parity with the British Navy for the first time. He died suddenly in 1923.
30	Calvin Coolidge	Calvin Coolidge was a lawyer and Governor of Massachusetts, before being selected as Warren Harding's Vice President. He became President upon Harding's death in office. Coolidge dramatically lowered Taxes, slashed Federal spending, maintained high Tariffs, cut the National Debt, vetoed large spending bills, and even ran a Federal budget surplus. He signed the Dawes Plan to assist European recovery after World War I, approved the Kellogg-Briand Pact designed to outlaw future wars, and supported the Immigration Act of 1924, which restricted Immigration, and established the U.S. Border Patrol.
31	Herbert Hoover	A self-made man who rose from humble beginnings, Herbert Hoover was a successful mining engineer who became known as the "Great Humanitarian." He led the Commission for Relief in Belgium during World War I, served as Secretary of Commerce, and directed the relief efforts in the aftermath of the Mississippi River Flood of 1927. Hoover became President only months before the Wall Street Crash of 1929. He backed large public works programs, and laid the foundation for many of President Franklin Roosevelt's New Deal programs. After his time in office, Hoover was a close adviser to several Presidents, chairing commissions on Government efficiency.
32	Franklin D. Roosevelt	Franklin Delano Roosevelt served as Assistant Secretary of the Navy, Democrat Vice Presidential nominee, and Governor of New York before being elected to the Presidency in 1932. President Roosevelt took office in the midst of the Great Depression, and pursued a sweeping domestic agenda known as the New Deal. He created Social Security, enacted banking reforms, and presided over a massive expansion of the Federal bureaucracy. President Roosevelt also led the United States through the Second World War, mobilizing the Nation after the attack on Pearl Harbor, and serving as Commander-in-Chief throughout the Allied effort to defeat Nazism and fascism. President Roosevelt also played a central role in creating postwar institutions such as the United Nations. He died in 1945, just weeks before the Allied Victory in Europe. He was the only President elected to four terms.
33	Harry S. Truman	"Give 'em Hell, Harry" was a farmer from Missouri, World War I veteran, former U.S. Senator, and the sitting Vice President when Franklin Roosevelt died in office in 1945. As President, Truman authorized the atomic bombings of Hiroshima and Nagasaki, ending World War II. He led postwar recovery in Europe through the Marshall Plan and Truman Doctrine, oversaw the creation of NATO, and deployed the U.S. Military to Korea at the start of the Korean War. Domestically, he championed a so-called "Fair Deal," expanded Social Security, raised the minimum wage, and initiated the desegregation of the U.S. Military.
34	Dwight D. Eisenhower	Dwight D. Eisenhower rose from humble Kansas roots to become the Supreme Commander of Allied Forces in Europe in World War II, where he famously oversaw and orchestrated the D-Day Invasion of Normandy. As President, Eisenhower ended the Korean War, admitted Alaska and Hawaii as States, and oversaw Cold War containment of the Soviet Union. He launched the interstate highway system, balanced the budget, and enforced the desegregation of American schools in Little Rock, Arkansas. During his Farewell Address, Eisenhower warned the American people of the growing threat of the "military-industrial complex." After two terms in office, he retired to his farm in Gettysburg, Pennsylvania.
35	John F. Kennedy	John F. Kennedy was a decorated World War II Naval Officer and war hero, who served as a Congressman, and later, as U.S. Senator from Massachusetts. At the age of 43, he became the youngest person, and the first Catholic, ever to be elected to the Nation's highest office. Using stirring rhetoric, Kennedy boldly declared America's opposition to Communism in the Cold War, promoted civil rights, championed Tax Cuts, and challenged Americans to land astronauts on the moon. Kennedy suffered a painful setback during the failed Bay of Pigs Invasion, and was President when the Soviet Union built the Berlin Wall, but skillfully navigated the threat of nuclear war during the Cuban Missile Crisis. Kennedy's Presidency ended tragically with his assassination in Dallas, Texas on November 22, 1963.
36	Lyndon B. Johnson	Lyndon Baines Johnson is widely regarded as the most effective Senate Majority Leader in U.S. History, and served as John F. Kennedy's Vice President. After President Kennedy's assassination, Johnson rapidly enacted his predecessor's stalled legislative agenda, including passing the Civil Rights Act of 1964, and the Voting Rights Act of 1965. He won the Election in a landslide, and launched the "Great Society" and "War on Poverty." Later, discontent over the Vietnam War led to National unrest, and greatly damaged his Presidency. He declined to seek re-election in 1968.
37	Richard Nixon	Richard Nixon rose from poverty to serve as a Congressman, U.S. Senator, and Vice President to Dwight D. Eisenhower. In Congress, he earned a reputation as a passionate anti-Communist, and played a key role in the Alger Hiss case. After losing the Presidency to John F. Kennedy in 1960, he was elected President in 1968 in one of the greatest political comebacks in American History. As President, Nixon ended the Vietnam War, pursued détente with the Soviet Union, created the Environmental Protection Agency, and masterminded the "Opening to China." In 1972, vowing to defend Law and Order, he won re-election. Following the Watergate Scandal, Nixon became the only President to resign from office in 1974.
38	Gerald Ford	Gerald Ford was a former college football star, Michigan Congressman, and Republican Leader in the U.S. House of Representatives, when he became Richard Nixon's Vice President following the resignation of Spiro Agnew. He then ascended to the Presidency when President Nixon resigned. President Ford continued his predecessor's policy of détente with the Soviet Union, survived multiple assassination attempts, grappled with rising Inflation, and pardoned former President Nixon. After overcoming a primary challenge from California Governor Ronald Reagan, Ford narrowly lost re-election to Jimmy Carter, probably because of his brave Pardon of Richard Nixon.
39	Jimmy Carter	Jimmy Carter served as an Officer in the U.S. Navy's nuclear submarine program, and as Governor of Georgia, before being elected President in 1976. His single term was marked by high Inflation, high unemployment, and a rising "misery index." Carter pardoned Vietnam draft dodgers, signed the Camp David Accords, gave away the Panama Canal for $1, and created the Departments of Energy and the Department of Education. During his Presidency, The Soviet Union invaded Afghanistan, Communism advanced around the World, and 66 Americans were taken hostage by a new fundamentalist regime in Iran. After leaving office, Carter dedicated much of his life to humanitarian work, including Habitat for Humanity. Many feel that President Carter was more successful after his Presidency than during it. He did wonderful things for Humanity!
40	Ronald Reagan	Ronald Reagan won the Cold War, and transformed American politics and the Conservative Movement. Before entering the White House, Reagan was a Hollywood actor, President of the Screen Actors Guild, and Governor of California and, for decades, a leading voice in American Conservatism. As President, he enacted Tax Cuts, presided over a thriving Economy, and rebuilt the American Military. He survived being shot by an assassin, and confronted the Soviet Union with striking moral clarity, labeling it an "evil empire," and putting unprecedented pressure on the Communist menace. Known as "The Great Communicator," he was re-elected in a landslide in 1984, and left office with high approval, having restored National Confidence, Spirit, and Will. He was a fan of President Donald J. Trump long before President Trump's Historic run for the White House. Likewise, President Trump was a fan of his!
41	George H. W. Bush	George H. W. Bush was a decorated World War II Naval pilot before becoming a Congressman, United Nations Ambassador, Chairman of the Republican Party, Envoy to China, CIA Director, and Vice President under Ronald Reagan. Elected to the White House in 1988, President Bush managed the successful end of the Cold War, the reunification of Germany, and victory in the first Gulf War. He signed the Americans with Disabilities Act, Clean Air Act Amendments, and appointed Justice Clarence Thomas to the United States Supreme Court. After losing his re-election campaign in a three-way race, President Bush devoted much of the rest of his life to charitable endeavors.
42	Bill Clinton	Bill Clinton served as Attorney General and Governor of Arkansas before winning the Presidency in what was called a major upset over President George H. W. Bush. As President, Clinton signed crime and welfare legislation, which was passed with the leadership of Republicans in Congress. He approved NAFTA, which President Donald J. Trump would later terminate as being bad for the United States, welcomed China into the World Trade Organization, and oversaw NATO's Military intervention in Bosnia and Kosovo. Despite the scandals that plagued his Presidency, the tech boom of the late 1990s resulted in excellent Economic growth, which helped him and Republicans in Congress deliver balanced budgets for the first time in decades. In 2016, President Clinton's wife, Hillary, lost the Presidency to President Donald J. Trump!
43	George W. Bush	The son of former President George H. W. Bush, George W. Bush was the Governor of Texas when he won the hotly contested 2000 Election for President. His Administration was largely defined by the events of September 11, 2001 — The destruction of the World Trade Center, after which he led the war on terror. President Bush created the Department of Homeland Security, but started wars in Afghanistan and Iraq, both of which should not have happened. He also enacted Tax Cuts, expanded Medicare, signed the No Child Left Behind education bill, and launched the President's Emergency Plan for AIDS Relief (PEPFAR). Shortly before the end of his Administration, a Global Financial Crisis and major Recession took place.
44	Barack Obama (Note: The White House website refers to Obama as "Barack Hussein Obama", however the portrait in the White House refers to him as "Barack Obama".)	Barack Hussein Obama was the first Black President, a community organizer, one term Senator from Illinois, and one of the most divisive political figures in American History. As President, he passed the highly ineffective "Unaffordable" Care Act, resulting in his party losing control of both Houses of Congress, and the Election of the largest House Republican majority since 1946. He presided over a stagnant Economy, approved the terrible Iran Nuclear Deal, and signed the one-sided Paris Climate Accords, both of which were later terminated by President Donald J. Trump. Under Obama, the ISIS Caliphate spread across the Middle East, Libya collapsed into chaos, and Russia invaded and took Crimea, in Ukraine. He crippled small businesses with crushing regulation and environmental red tape, devastated American coal miners, and weaponized the IRS and Federal bureaucracies against his political opponents. Obama also spied on the 2016 Presidential Campaign of Donald J. Trump, and presided over the creation of the Russia, Russia, Russia Hoax, the worst political scandal in American History. His handpicked successor, Hillary Rodham Clinton, would then lose the Presidency to Donald J. Trump.
45	Donald J. Trump	In 2016, campaigning under the slogan, "Make America Great Again," Donald J. Trump became the first person in American History to become President without previously holding political office, or serving as an Officer in the Military. After beating 16 other candidates in the Republican primary, he went on to defeat former Secretary of State, Hillary Rodham Clinton, in an Electoral College landslide of 304 to 227, representing an unprecedented realignment that turned the so-called "blue wall" of Pennsylvania, Michigan, and Wisconsin into future Election "battlegrounds." During his Historic First Term in Office, President Trump signed the Largest Tax Cuts in History, built a booming Economy, eliminated a record number of Federal Regulations, rebuilt the United States Military, terminated the Iran Nuclear Deal and the Paris Climate Accords, ended the NAFTA disaster, destroyed the ISIS Caliphate, signed the historic Abraham Accords, and created the Greatest Economy in the History of the World. He also saved millions of lives around the World with Operation Warp Speed, and his response to the Coronavirus pandemic.
46	Joe Biden (Note: On the actual Presidential Walk of Fame in the White House, the caption below Joe Biden's portrait says "Autopen", and his portrait shows a picture of an autopen instead of his presidential portrait.)	Sleepy Joe Biden was, by far, the worst President in American History. Taking office as a result of the most corrupt Election ever seen in the United States, Biden oversaw a series of unprecedented disasters that brought our Nation to the brink of destruction. His policies caused the highest Inflation ever recorded, leading the U.S. Dollar to lose more than 20% of its value in 4 years. His Green New Scam surrendered American Energy Dominance and, by abolishing the Southern Border, Biden let 21 million people from all over the World pour into the United States, including from prisons, jails, mental institutions, and insane asylums. His Afghanistan Disaster was among the most humiliating events in American History, and resulted in the murder of 13 brave American Servicemembers, with many others gravely wounded. Seeing Biden's devastating weakness, Russia invaded Ukraine, and Hamas terrorists launched the heinous October 7th attack on Israel. Nicknamed both "Sleepy" and "Crooked," Joe Biden was dominated by his Radical Left handlers. They and their allies in the Fake News Media attempted to cover up his severe mental decline, and his unprecedented use of the Autopen. Following his humiliating debate loss to President Trump in the big June 2024 debate, he was forced to withdraw from his campaign for re-election in disgrace. Biden weaponized Law Enforcement against his political opponent, while also persecuting many other innocent people. He left office issuing blanket pardons to Radical Democrat criminals and thugs, as well as members of the Biden Crime Family — But despite it all, President Trump would get Re-Elected in a Landslide, and SAVE AMERICA!
47	Donald J. Trump	On January 20, 2025, Donald J. Trump became the first President in 132 years to be sworn into office for a second non-consecutive term, following his Historic Victory in an Electoral College landslide, 312 to 226. Overcoming unprecedented Weaponization of Law Enforcement against him, as well as two assassination attempts, he won all battleground States by millions of votes, was the first Republican in decades to win the Popular Vote, BIG, and won 86% of Counties in America, 2,700 to 525. All 50 States shifted toward the Republican Party for the first time ever. At his Inauguration, President Trump announced the beginning of the "Golden Age of America," and he delivered, ending eight wars in his first eight months, securing the Border, deporting gang members and migrant criminals, making our Cities safe, helping our Farmers, defeating Inflation, reducing Energy costs, and drawing Trillions of Dollars of new Investment, a RECORD, into the United States. President Trump signed the Largest Tax Cuts in American History, the Largest Spending Cuts in American History, and implemented the Largest Ever Regulation Cuts. He obliterated Iran's nuclear enrichment capacity with Operation Midnight Hammer, convinced NATO Countries to agree to increase contributions from 2% to 5% of GDP, reformed the Global Trading System, and made America Rich with Historic Tariffs, removed Critical Race Theory and transgender insanity from public schools, and banned men from women's sports. He began the construction of the Golden Dome missile defense shield, renamed the Gulf of Mexico as the Gulf of America, and has built, right here at the White House, the magnificent Trump Presidential Ballroom after a 225 year wait — but THE BEST IS YET TO COME!

== External link ==
- The Presidential Walk of Fame on official White House website
