= West Wing =

Structure part of the White House complex

Coordinates: 38.8975°N 77.0376°W

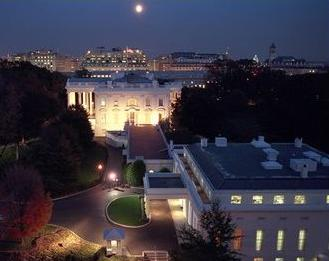
The West Wing (lower right) at night in December 2006

The West Wing is connected to the Executive Residence via the West Colonnade.

The West Wing of the White House is the location of the office space of the president of the United States. The West Wing contains the Oval Office, the Cabinet Room, the Situation Room, and the Roosevelt Room.

The West Wing's three floors include offices for the vice president, the White House chief of staff, the counselor to the president, the senior advisor to the president, the White House press secretary, and their support staffs. Adjoining the press secretary's office, along the colonnade between the West Wing and the Executive Residence, is the James S. Brady Press Briefing Room, along with workspace for the White House press corps.

== History ==
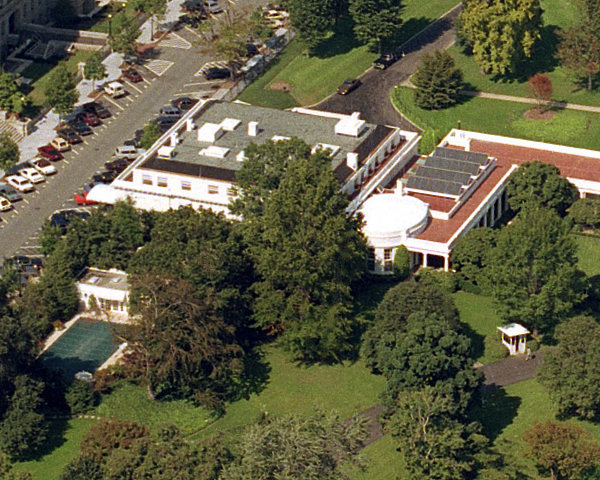
Aerial view of the West Wing with solar panels visible on the roof of the Cabinet Room in 1984

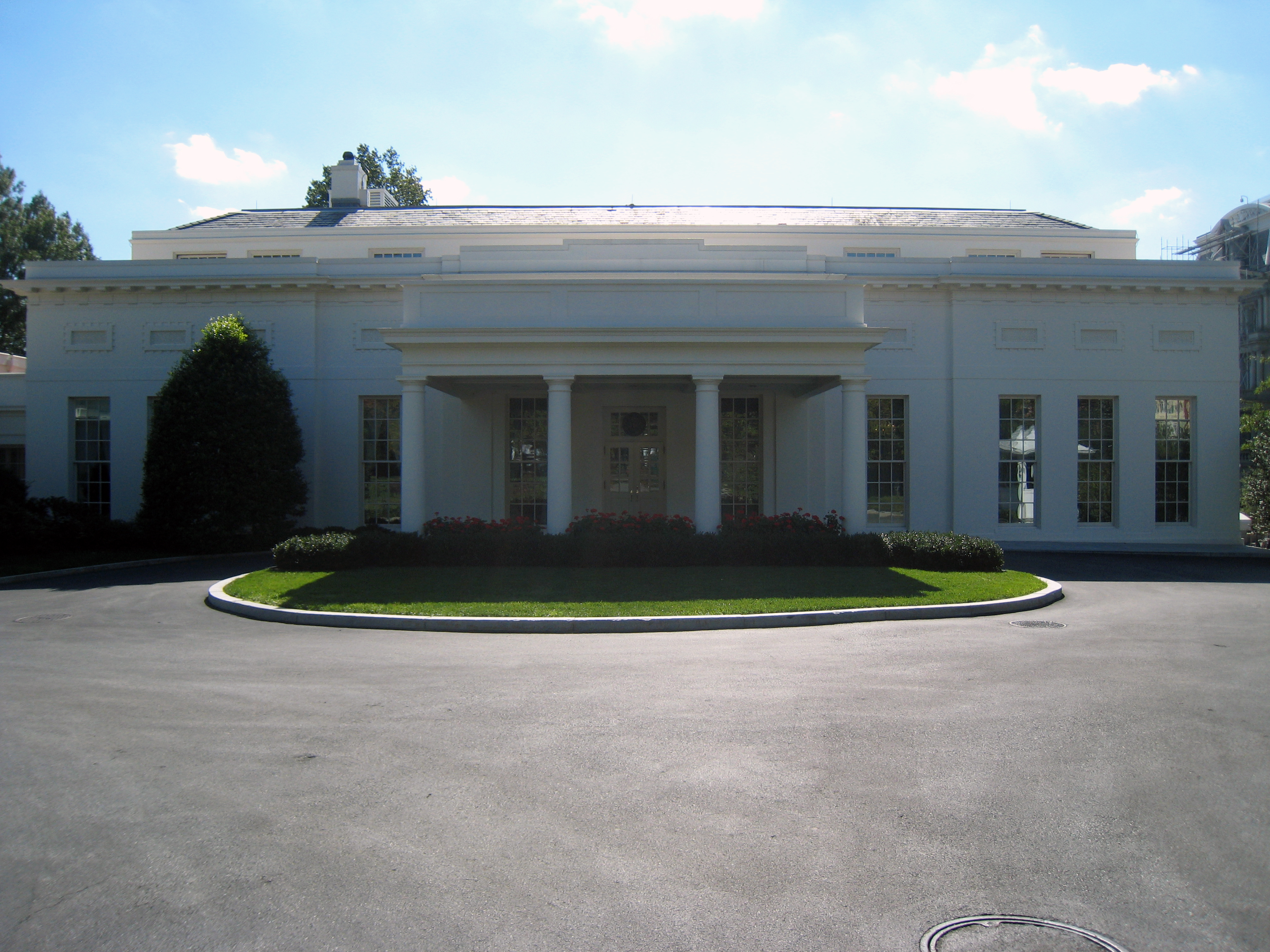
The main entrance on the north side in October 2007

Before the construction of the West Wing, offices for the president and his staff were on the eastern end of the second floor of the Executive Residence. However, when Theodore Roosevelt became president, he found that the existing offices in the mansion were insufficient to accommodate his family of six children as well as his staff.

A year later, in 1902, First Lady Edith Roosevelt hired McKim, Mead & White to separate the living quarters from the offices, to enlarge and modernize the public rooms, to re-do the landscaping, and to redecorate the interior. Congress approved over half a million dollars (equivalent to $19 million in 2025) for the renovation.

The West Wing was originally intended as a temporary office structure; the site where it was built had formerly been occupied by stables and greenhouses. The president's rectangular office and the adjacent cabinet room were located in the eastern third of the West Wing, approximately where the Roosevelt Room is now.

In 1909, William Howard Taft expanded the building southward, covering the tennis court. He placed the first Oval Office at the center of the addition's south facade, reminiscent of the oval rooms in the Executive Residence.

Herbert Hoover remodeled the West Wing early in his presidency, excavating a partial basement and supporting it with structural steel. The completed reconstruction lasted less than seven months. On December 24, 1929, the West Wing was significantly damaged by a four-alarm fire, the most destructive to strike the White House since the Burning of Washington 115 years earlier. Caused either by a faulty or blocked chimney flue or defective wiring, the fire began in the attic storage space where an estimated 200,000 government pamphlets quickly ignited. Fortunately, many important documents had recently been moved to the Library of Congress due to the remodeling of the West Wing. During 1930, Hoover had the West Wing rebuilt and added air-conditioning.

The fourth and final major reorganization was undertaken by Franklin D. Roosevelt. Dissatisfied with the size and layout of President Hoover's West Wing, he engaged New York architect Eric Gugler to redesign it in 1933. To create additional space without increasing the apparent size of the building, Gugler excavated a full basement, added a set of subterranean offices under the adjacent lawn, and built an unobtrusive "penthouse" storey. The directive to wring the most office space out of the existing building resulted in narrow corridors and generally small staff offices. Gugler's most notable change was the addition to the east side containing a new Cabinet Room, Secretary's Office, and Oval Office. The location of the new Oval Office gave presidents greater privacy, allowing them to slip back and forth between the Executive Residence and the West Wing outdoors on the covered portico, without being in the view of the staff or press indoors.

As the size of the president's staff grew over the latter half of the 20th century, the West Wing could no longer house the entire staff. Today, most of the staff members of the Executive Office of the President are located in the adjacent Eisenhower Executive Office Building.

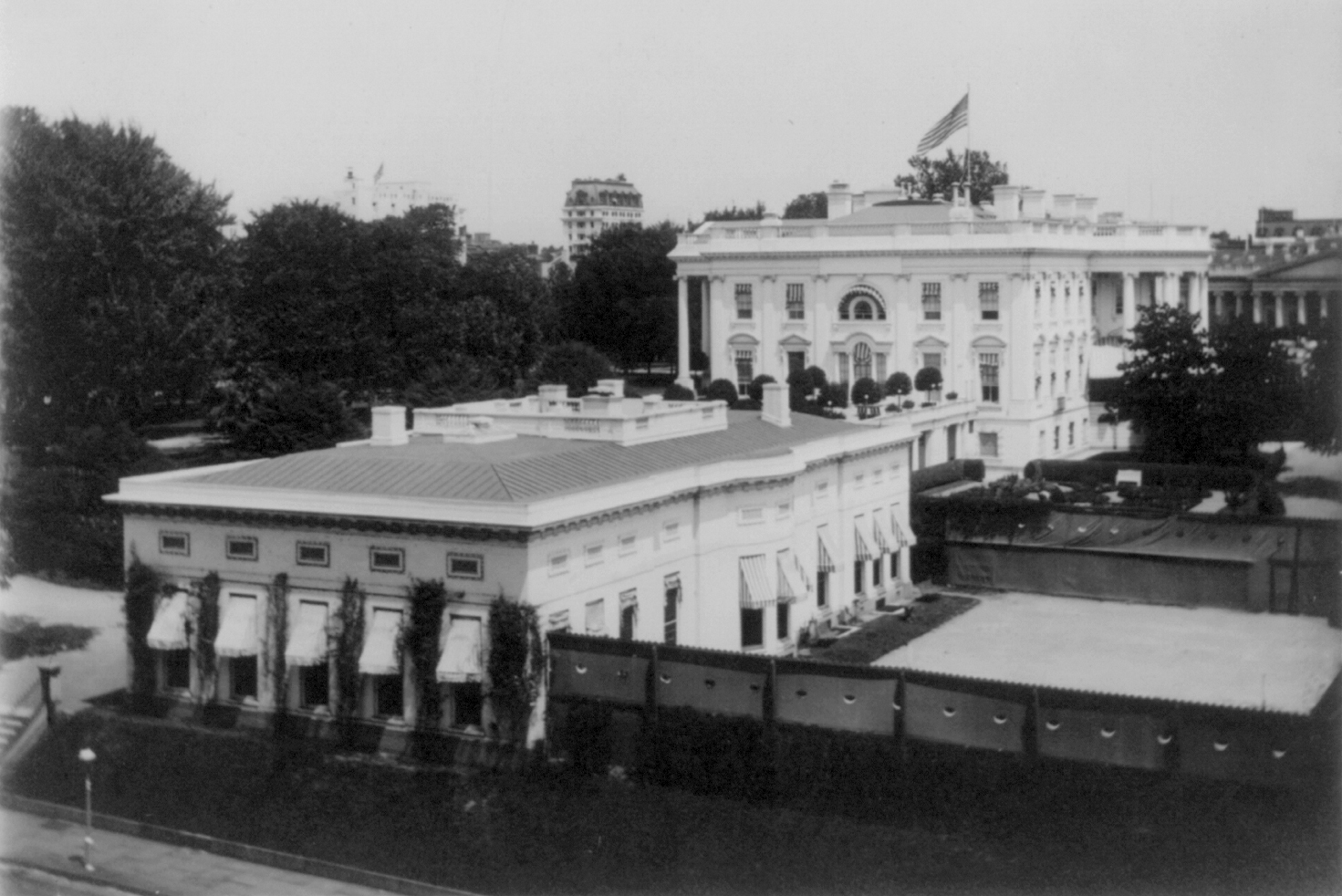
The original West Wing and tennis court, c. 1903

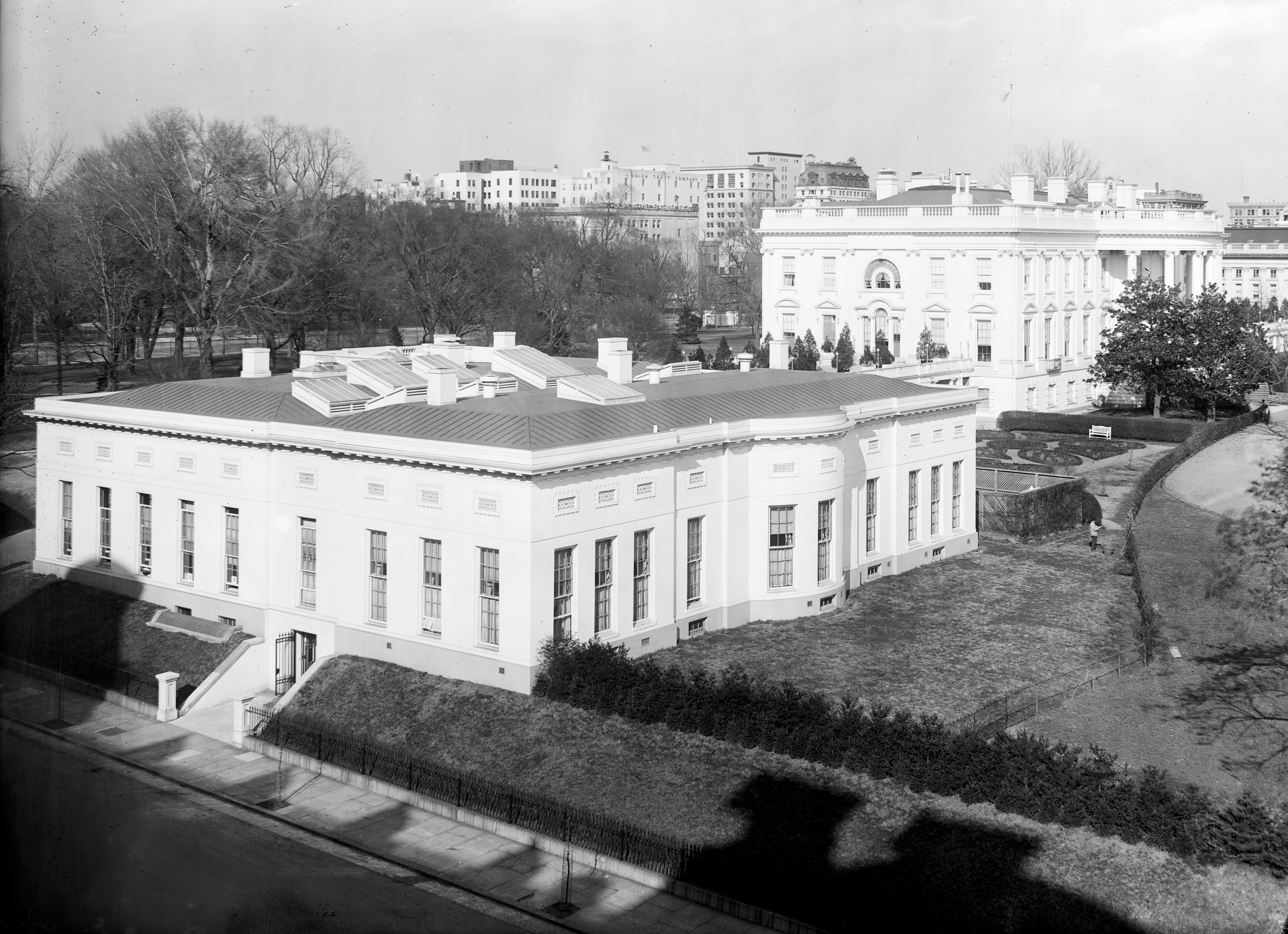
The expanded West Wing, c. 1910s, after President Taft's 1909 expansion covered most of the tennis court. Note the "bow" of the first Oval Office.

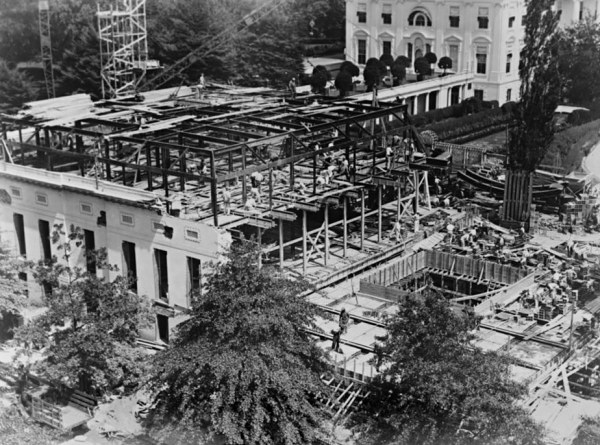
The modern West Wing under construction, c. 1933

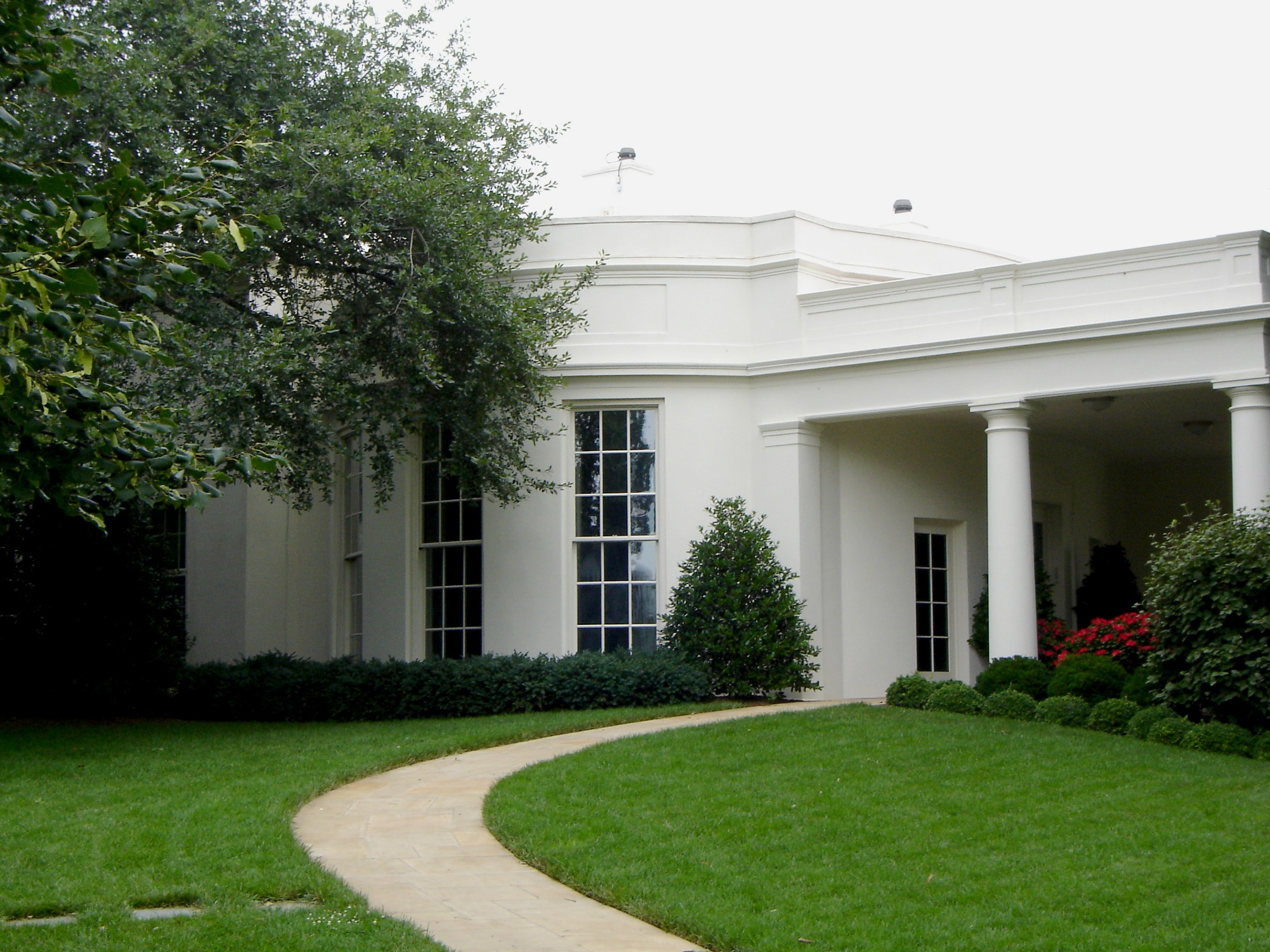
Exterior of the modern Oval Office, completed in 1934

== Ground floor ==
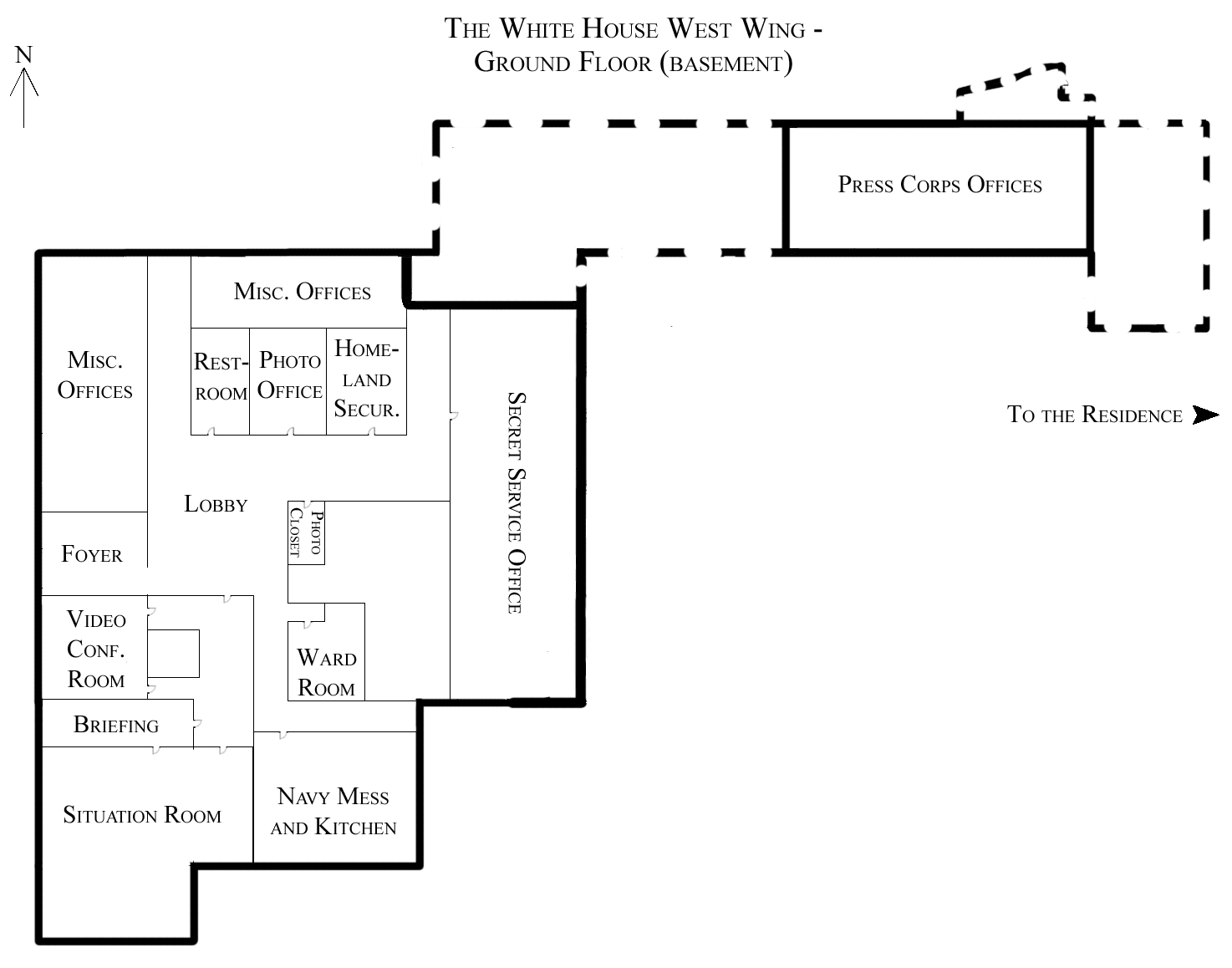
Ground Floor plan

The ground floor is partially a basement, as the White House was located on a hill.

=== Situation Room ===
The Situation Room & Watch Center is an intelligence management complex on the ground floor of the West Wing of the White House. Although the name suggests it is a single room, it is a 5,000 square feet (460 m^{2}) operations suite consisting of a duty watch station and three secure conference rooms. It is run by about 130 National Security Council (NSC) staff for the use of the president of the United States, chief of staff, national security advisor, homeland security advisor, and other senior advisors for monitoring and dealing with crises, as well as conducting secure communications with outside (often overseas) persons. The Situation Room has secure, advanced communications equipment for the president to maintain command and control of U.S. forces around the world. The Situation Room has been upgraded several times, most recently in late 2023.

=== White House Mess ===
The West Wing ground floor is also the site of a small restaurant operated by the Presidential Food Service and staffed by Naval culinary specialists and called the White House Mess. It is located underneath the Oval Office, and was established by President Truman on June 11, 1951.

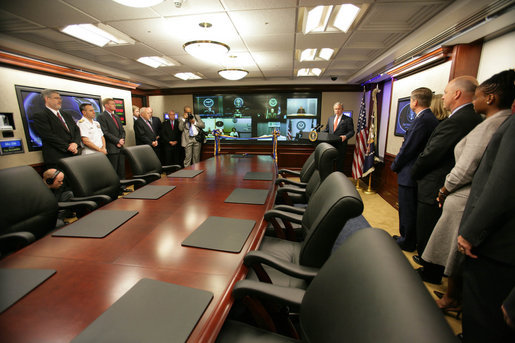
The Situation Room, newly renovated during the presidency of George W. Bush

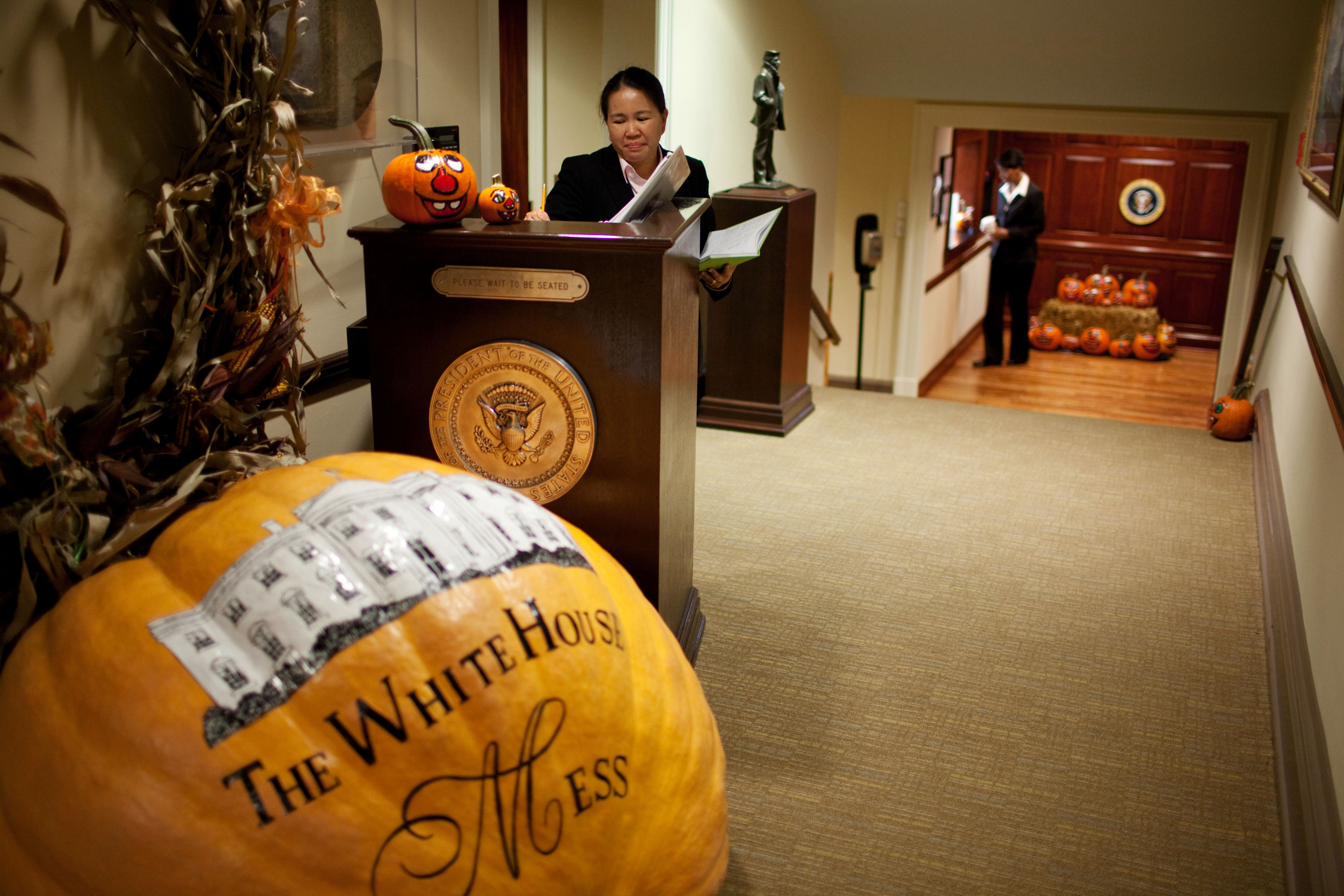
Entrance to the White House Mess, decorated for Halloween

== First floor ==
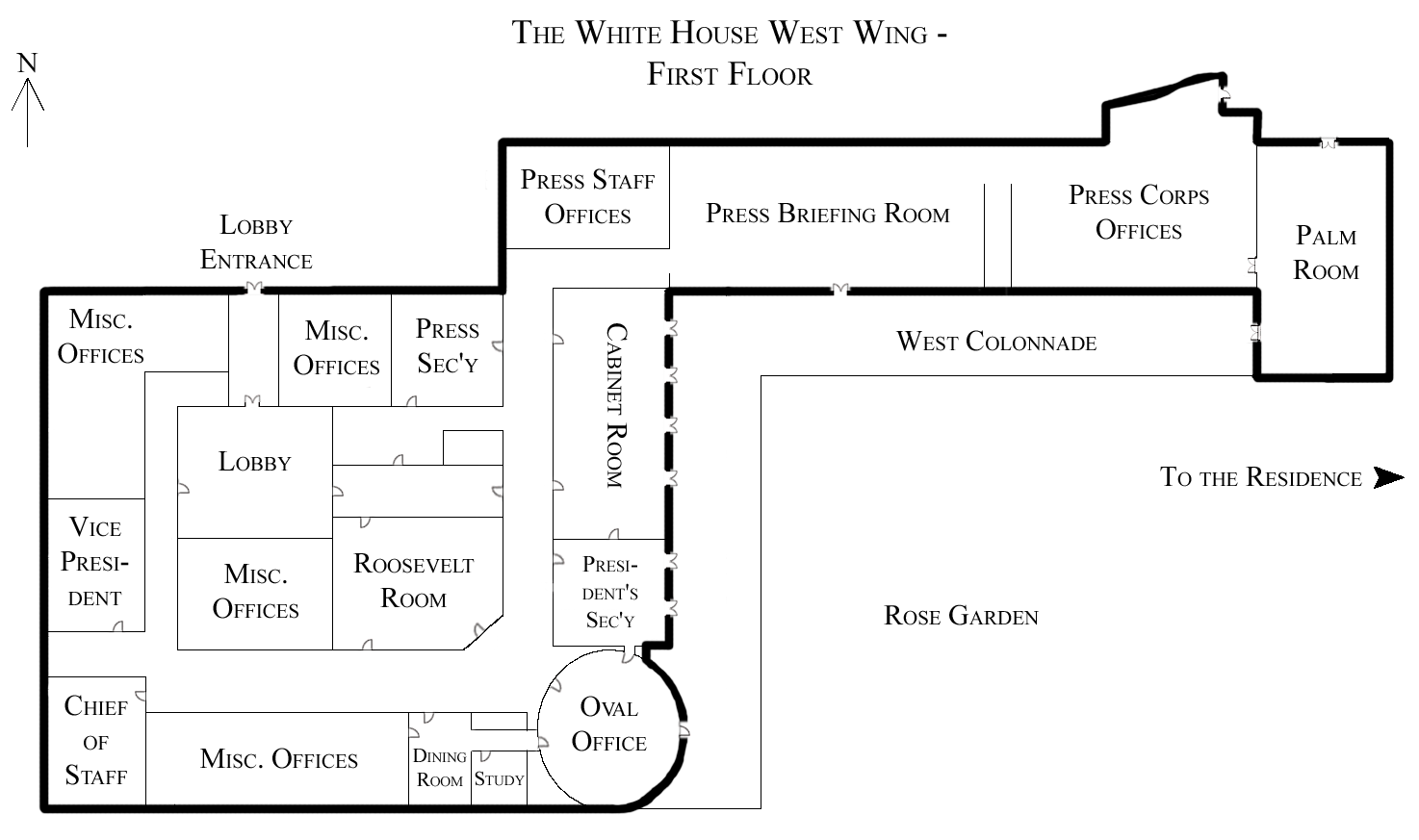
The first floor plan of the West Wing

=== Press Briefing Room ===
During the 1930s, the March of Dimes constructed a swimming pool so that Franklin Roosevelt could exercise, as therapy for his polio-related disability. Richard Nixon had the swimming pool covered over to create the Press Briefing Room, where the White House press secretary gives daily briefings.

=== Roosevelt Room ===
Originally this space was the office of Theodore Roosevelt, but later it was converted into a meeting room. It became known as the "Fish Room" because Franklin D. Roosevelt kept an aquarium there and because both he and John F. Kennedy displayed trophy fish on the walls.

In 1969, Richard Nixon renamed the room in honor of the two presidents Roosevelt: Theodore, who first constructed the West Wing, and Franklin, who built the current Oval Office. By tradition, a portrait of Franklin D. Roosevelt hangs over the mantel of the Roosevelt Room during the administration of a president from the Democratic Party and a portrait of Theodore Roosevelt hangs during the administration of a Republican president (although Bill Clinton chose to retain the portrait of Theodore Roosevelt above the mantel). In the past, the portrait not hanging over the mantel was displayed on the opposite wall. However, during the first term of George W. Bush, an audio-visual cabinet was placed on the opposite wall to provide secure audio and visual conference capabilities across the hall from the Oval Office.

=== West Colonnade ===
In 2025, Donald Trump unveiled the Presidential Walk of Fame on the West Colonnade. The Walk features black-and-white photographs of every president in gold frames, except for Joe Biden, whose portrait Trump replaced with a photograph of an autopen as a snub to his predecessor.

=== White House press corps ===
The journalists, correspondents, and others who are part of the White House press corps have offices near the press briefing room.

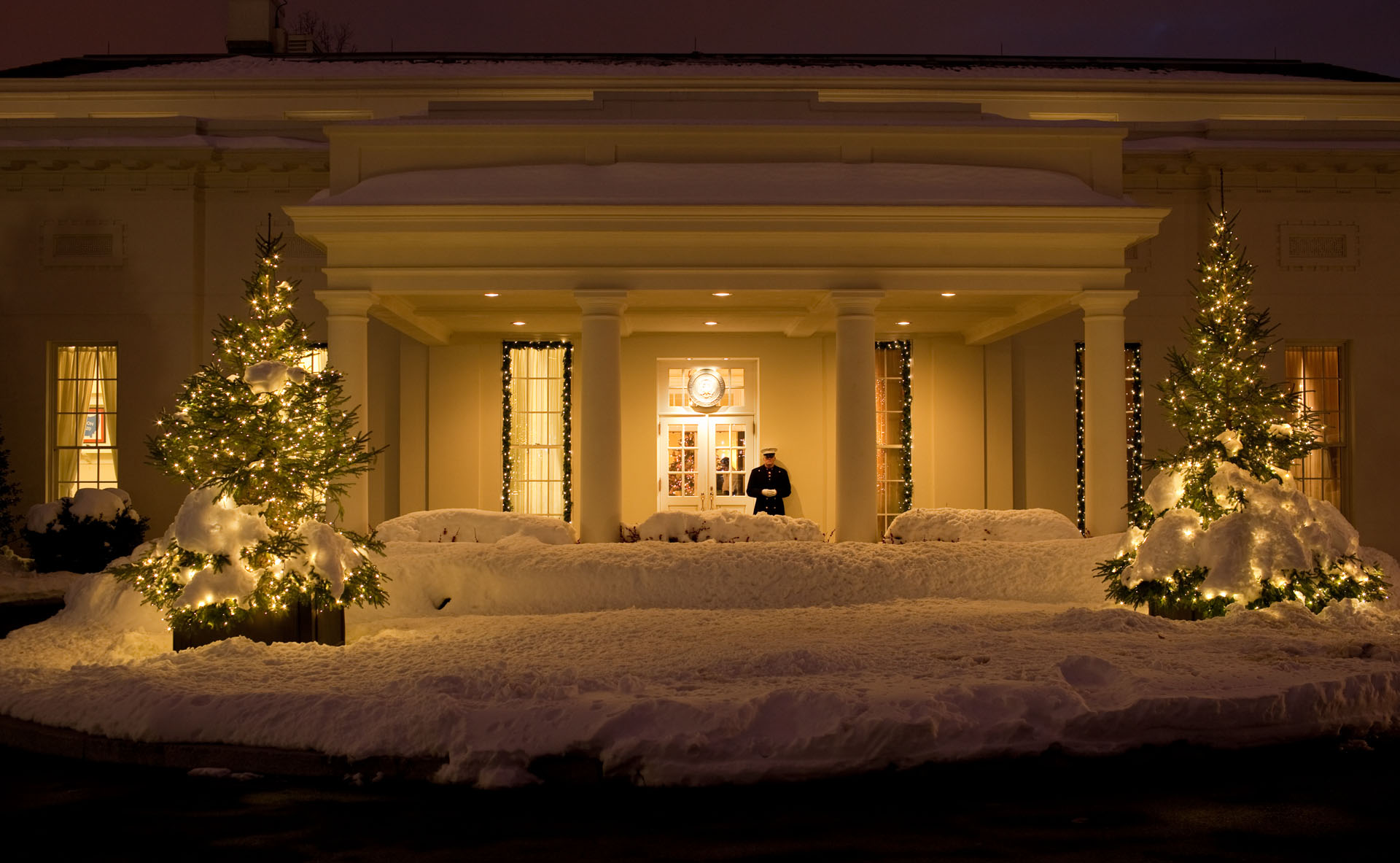
Entrance, 2009

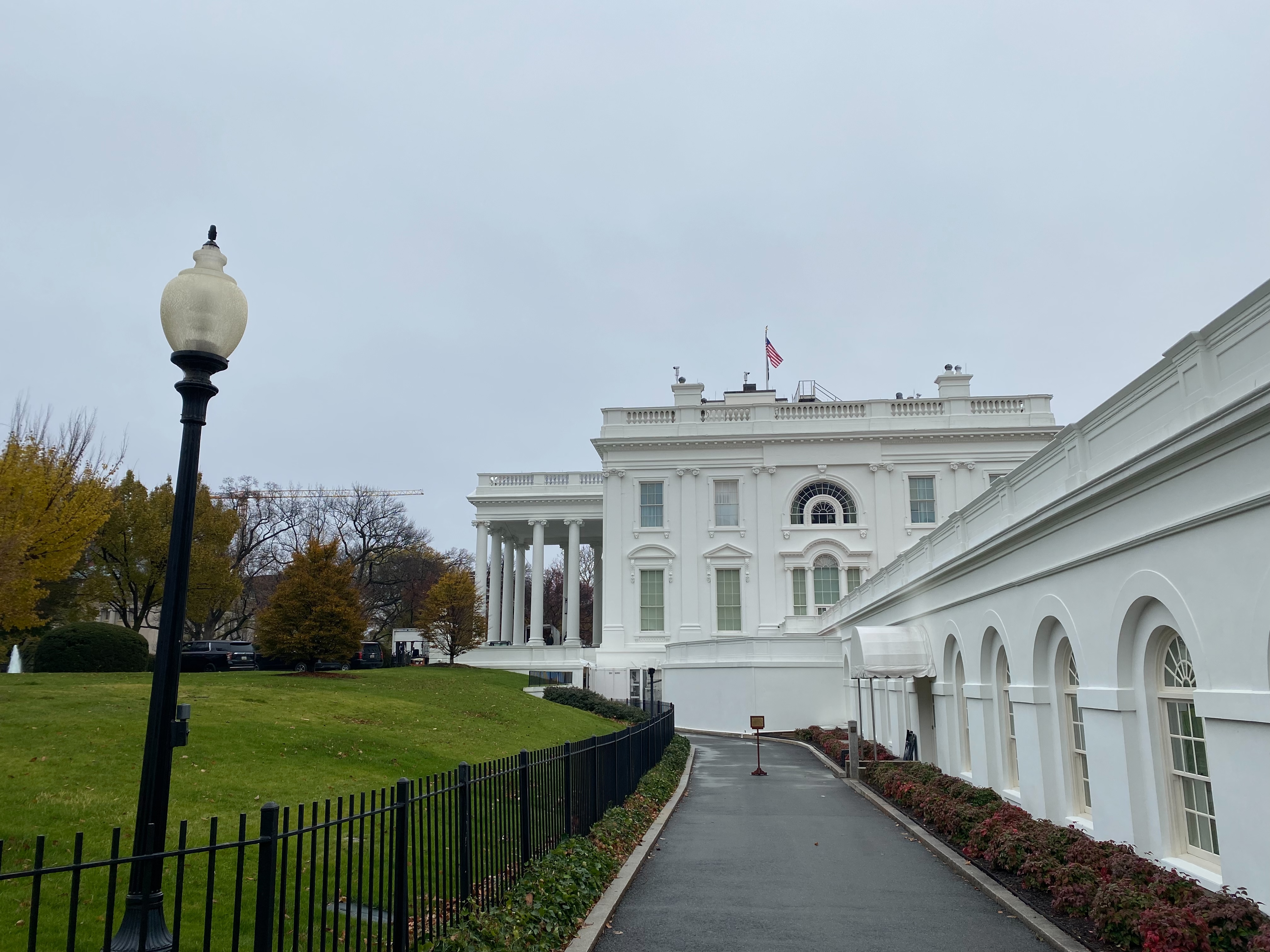
Exterior, 2022

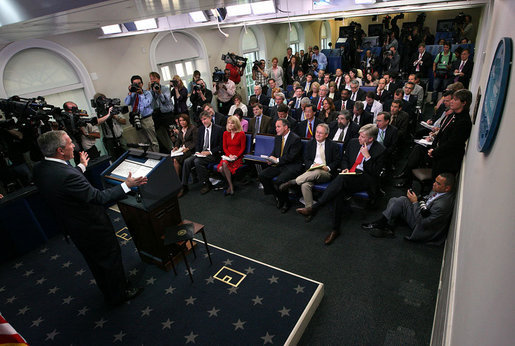
James S. Brady Press Briefing Room, 2007. Formerly, the swimming pool.

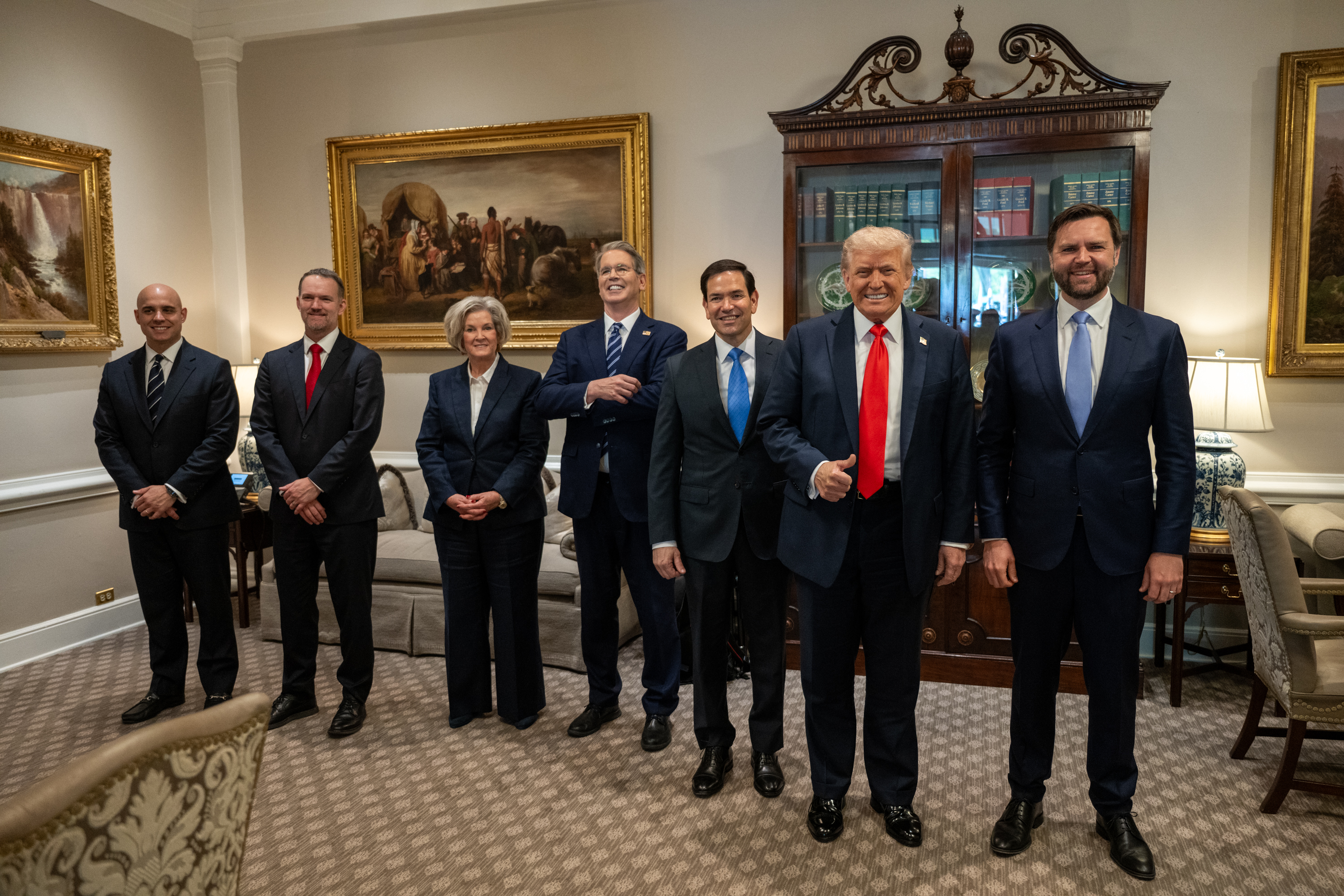
Lobby, 2025

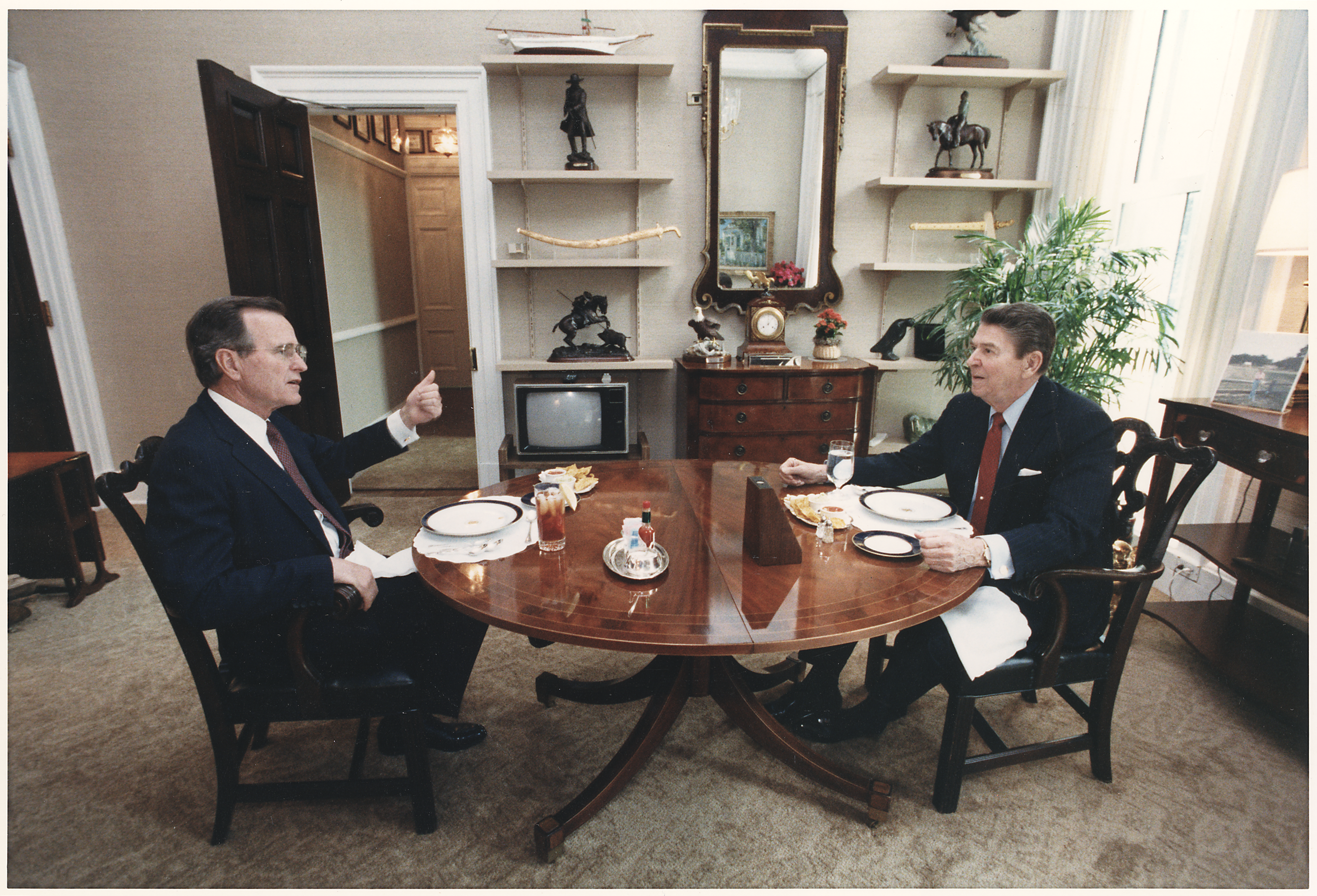
Private Dining Room, 1988

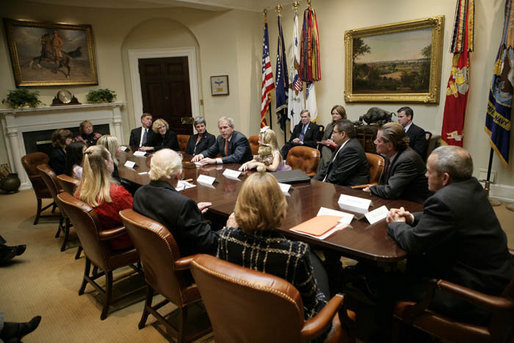
Roosevelt Room, 2006

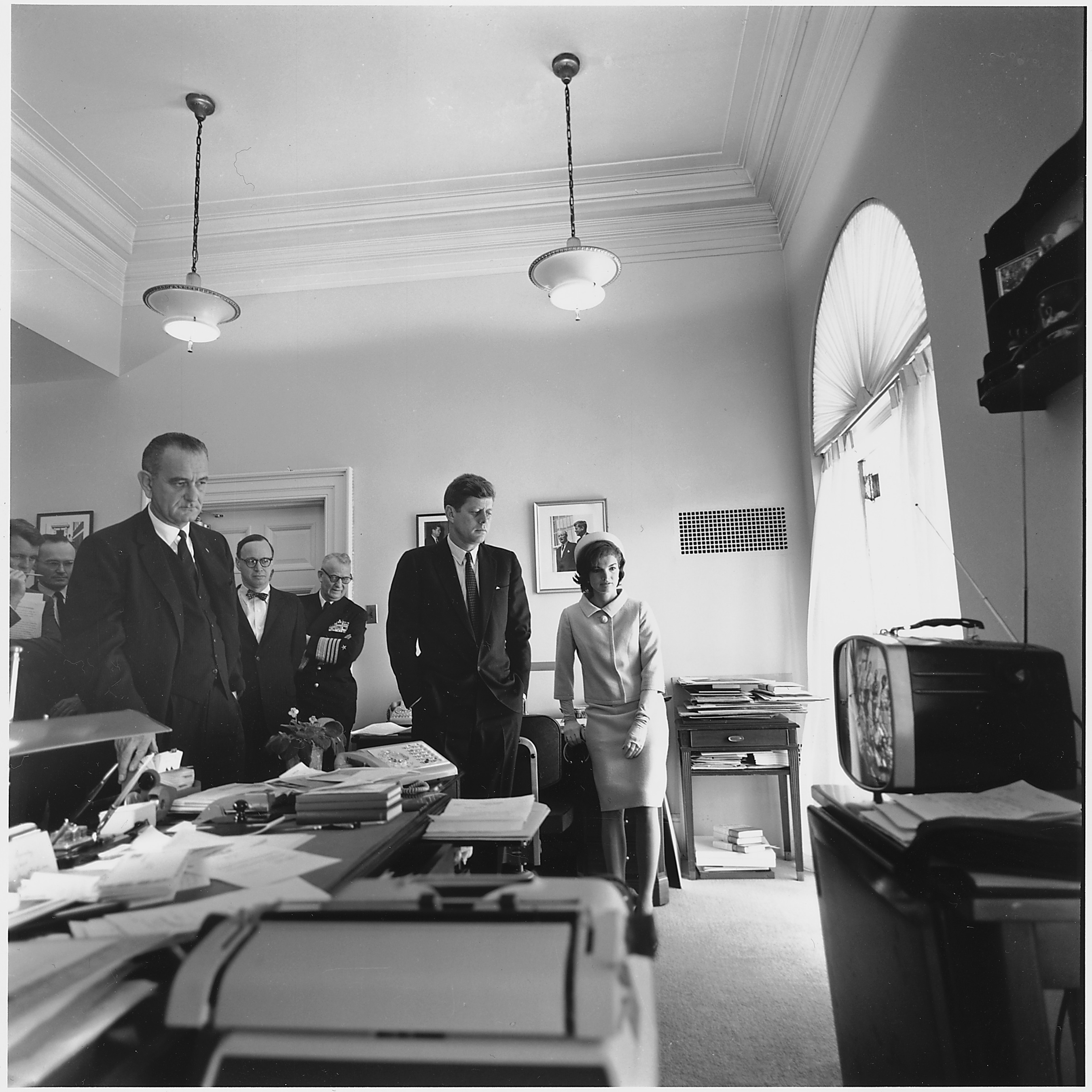
Secretary's Office, 1961

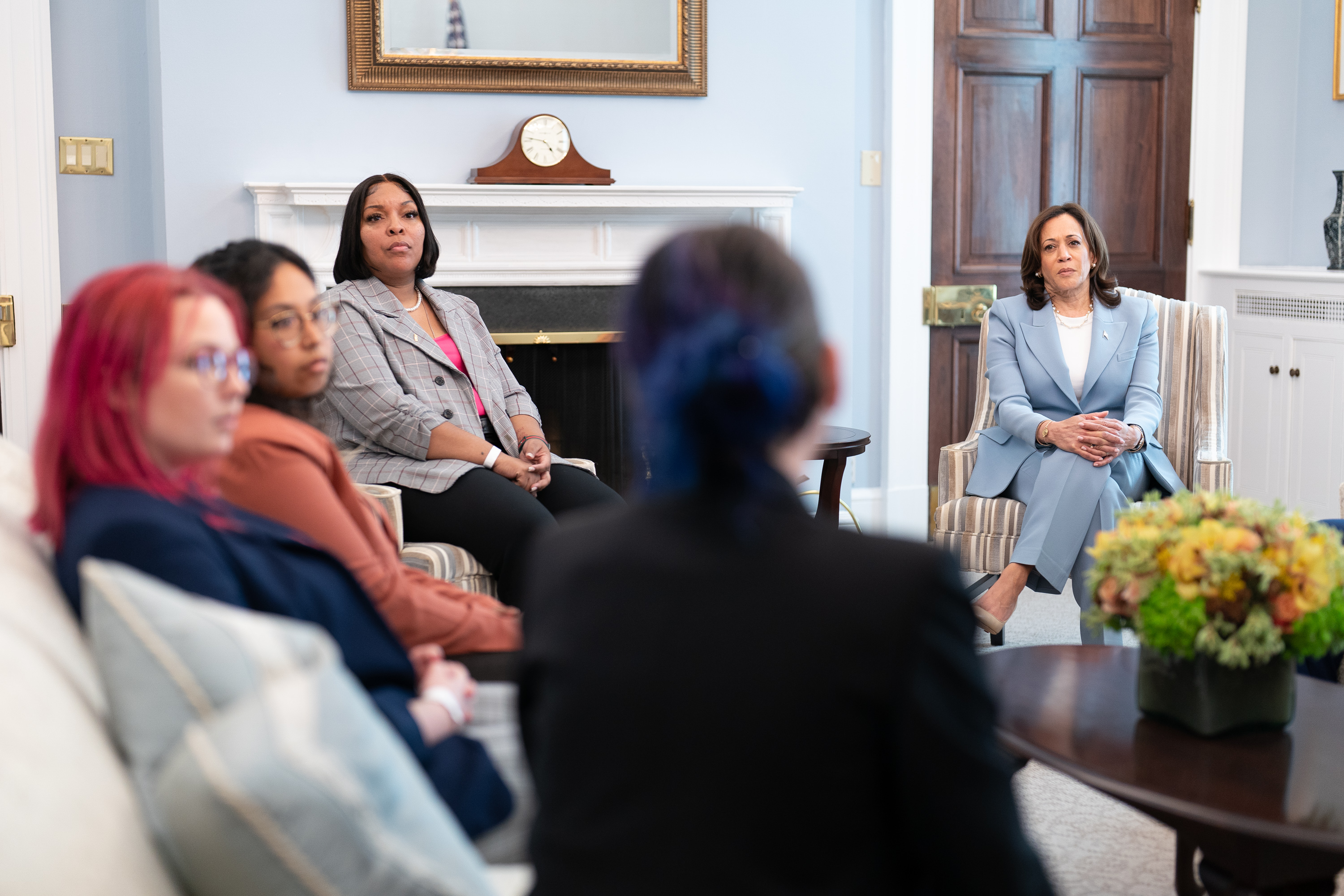
Vice President's Office, 2023

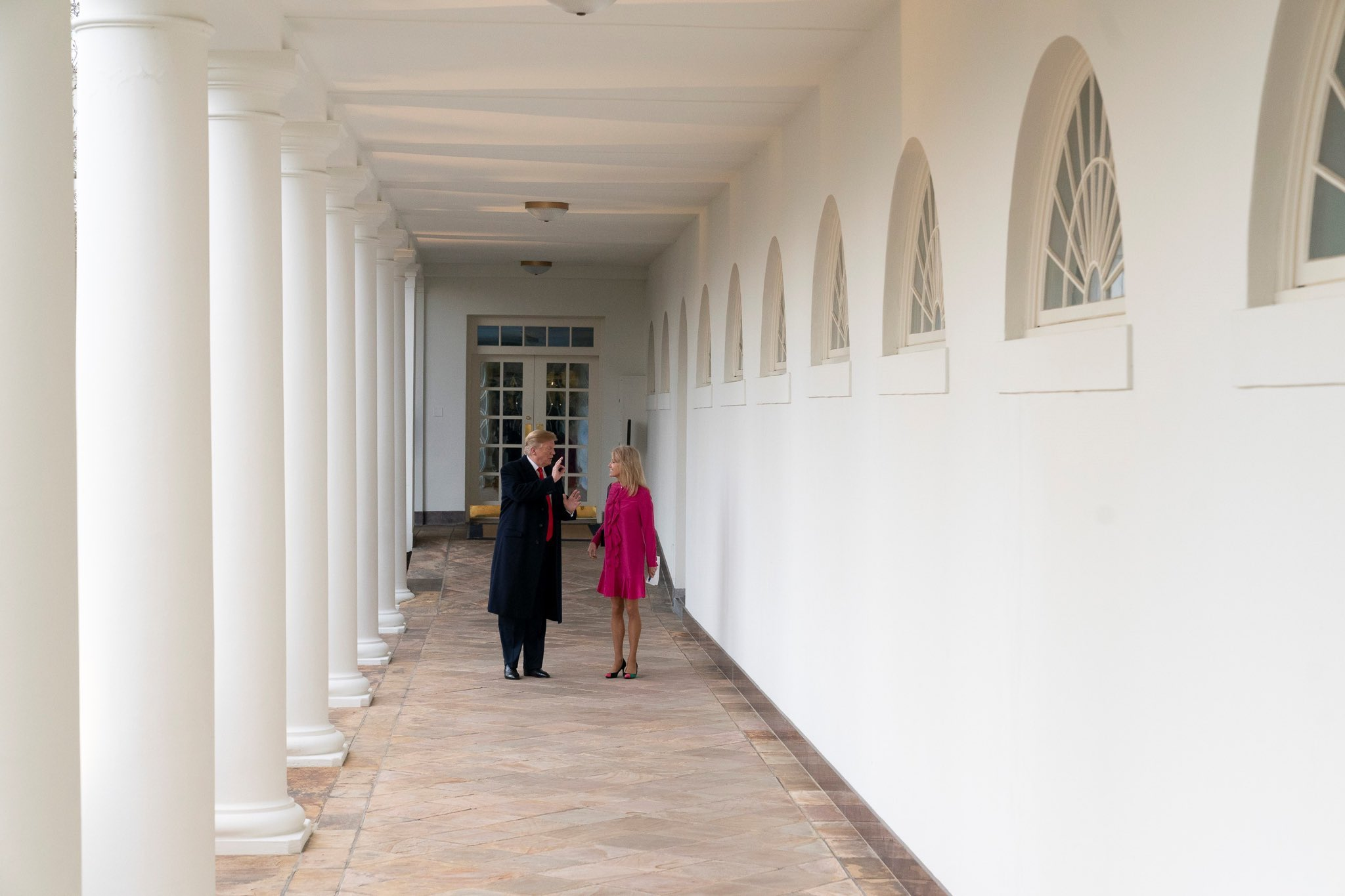
West Wing Colonnade, 2019

== Second floor ==
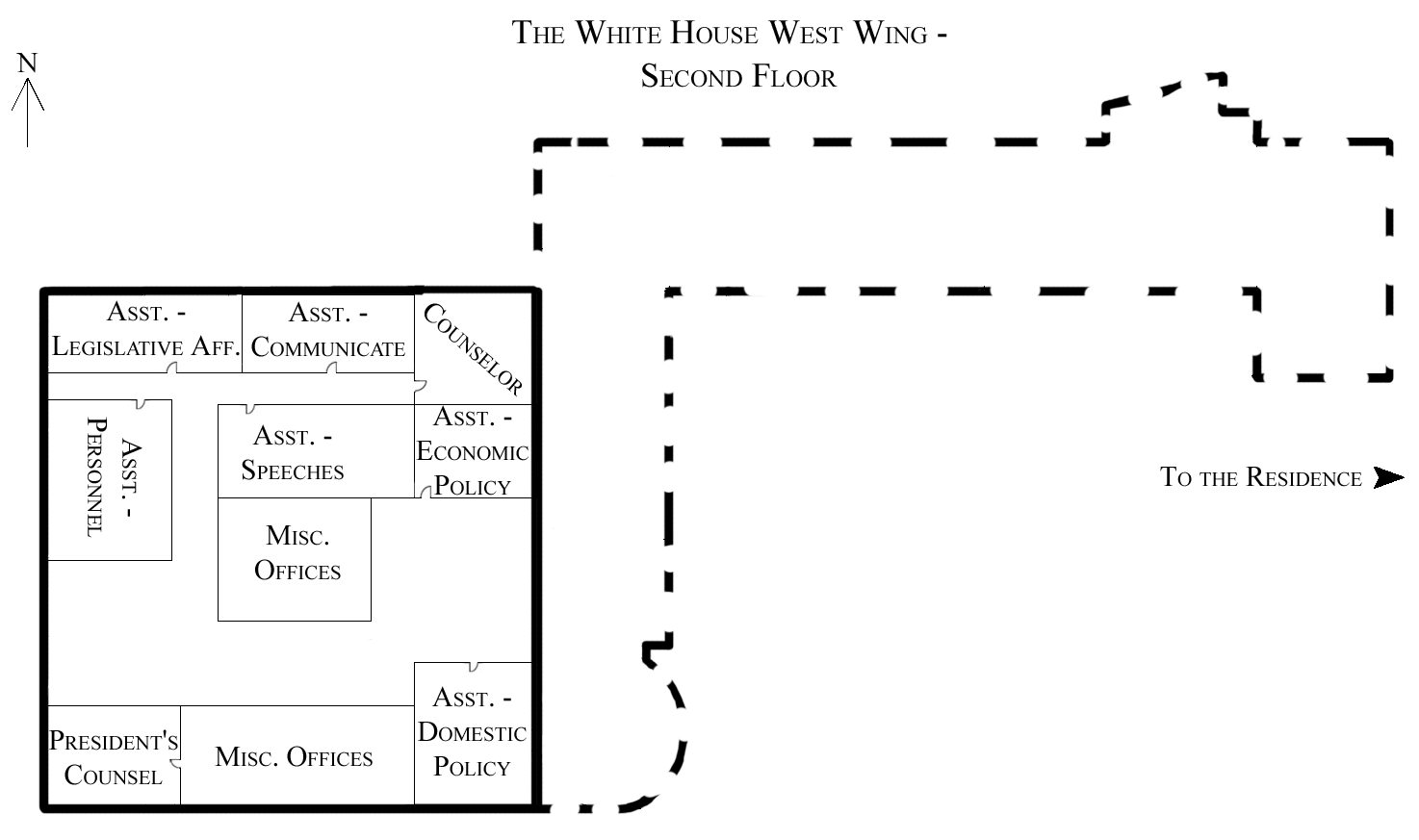
Second Floor plan

== Depiction on The West Wing TV series ==
In 1999, The West Wing television series brought greater public attention to the workings of the presidential staff, as well as to the location of those working in the West Wing. The show followed the working lives of a fictional Democratic U.S. president, Josiah Bartlet, and his senior staff. When asked whether the show accurately captured the working environment in 2003, Press Secretary Scott McClellan commented that the show portrayed more foot traffic and larger rooms than in the real West Wing.
