= Mark Hampton =

American interior designer (1940–1998)

- Born: Mark Iredell Hampton Jr. 1 June 1940; Indianapolis, Indiana, U.S.
- Died: 23 July 1998 (age 58); New York City, U.S.
- Resting place: Sag Harbor, New York, U.S.
- Education: BA, MFA, DFA
- Alma mater: DePauw University, London School of Economics, University of Michigan, New York University Institute of Fine Arts
- Known for: Interior design
- Notable work: White House (Oval Office), Camp David, Blair House
- Spouse: Duane Hampton

Mark Hampton (born Mark Iredell Hampton Jr., June 1, 1940 – July 23, 1998) was an American interior designer, writer, and illustrator, known primarily for his residential interior design work for clients such as Brooke Astor, Estee Lauder, Mike Wallace, Saul Steinberg, H. John Heinz III, and Lincoln Kirstein, as well as for three U.S. presidents. In 1986, he was inducted into the Interior Design Hall of Fame, and in 2010, Architectural Digest named him one of the world's top 20 designers of all time.

== Early life and education ==
Mark Hampton was born on June 1, 1940, in Indianapolis, to Mark Hampton Sr. and Alice Hampton (née Burkert). He was raised in Plainfield, Indiana. As a child, he spent time with Paul Hadley, a former instructor at the Herron School of Art and Design, and the designer of the Indiana State Flag. Hampton showed early inclinations toward an artistic life, and by the time he was twelve years old, considered himself to be a designer. He credited his success to making an early career choice. His early influences were interior designer Billy Baldwin, and architects Le Corbusier, Frank Lloyd Wright, and Phillip Johnson.

Hampton graduated from DePauw University (BA 1962), and while there, he studied at the London School of Economics as an exchange student for one semester. He studied law at the University of Michigan but left after one year to study at the University of Michigan's School of Fine Arts (BA 1964). He then moved to New York to attend the New York University Institute of Fine Arts (MFA 1967). After completing his studies at NYU, Hampton was awarded a Ford Foundation fellowship, funding travel abroad. In July 1964, he married Duane Flegel with whom he had two daughters, actress Kate Hampton and interior designer Alexa Hampton.

== Career ==
While in England in 1961, Hampton met interior designer David Hicks, who became a mentor and longtime friend. Hampton worked part-time, while at NYU, for the interior designer Sister Parish, and then for several years managed Hicks's New York office. From 1969 to 1975, he worked for the interior design firm McMillen, Inc., headed at the time by Eleanor Brown. He opened his own firm, Mark Hampton LLC, in 1976, and during the course of his career, designed the interiors of numerous residences, offices, hotels, private clubs, railroad cars, airplanes, and boats.

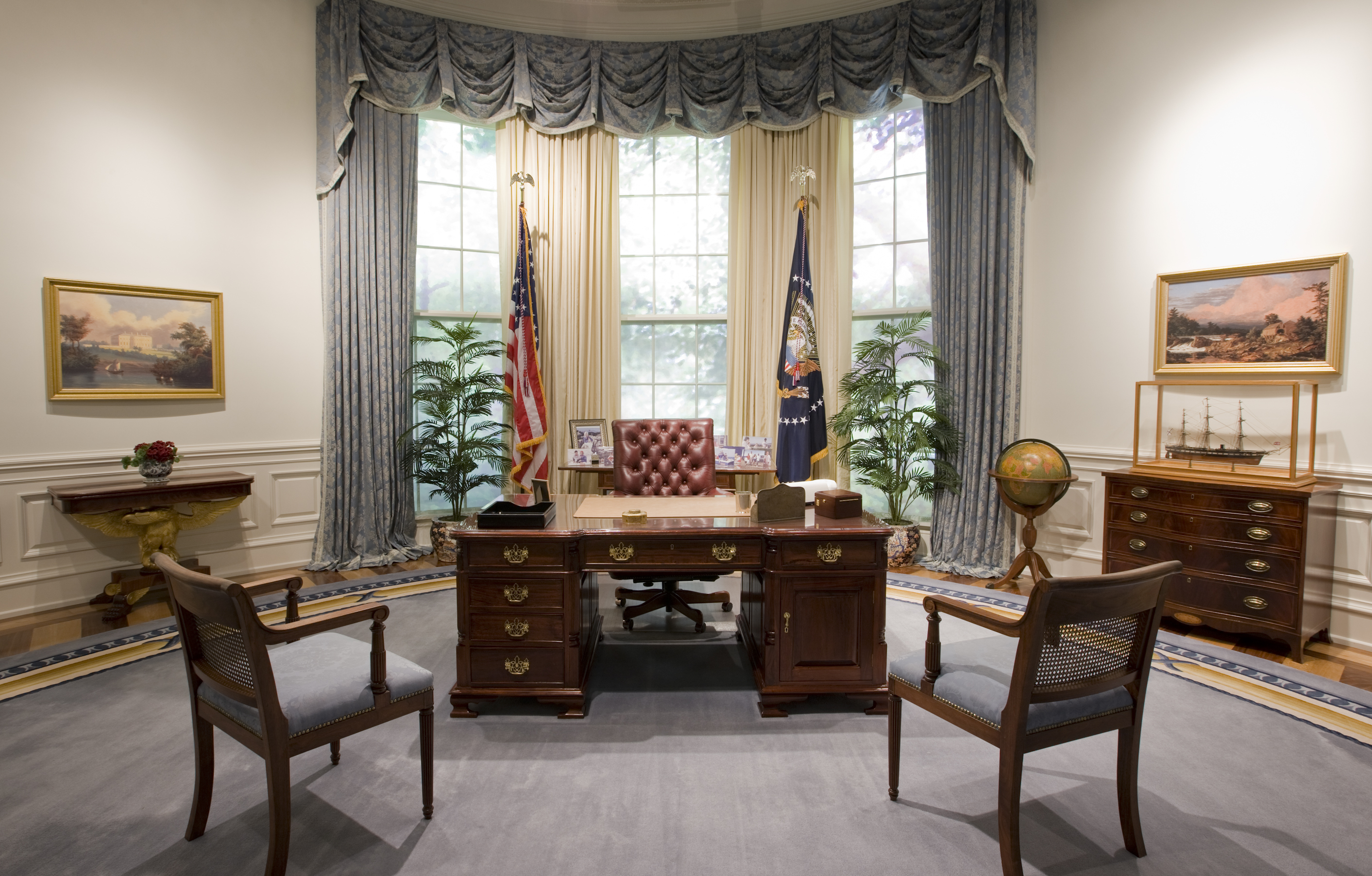
Replica of the Oval Office as decorated by Mark Hampton for George H. W. Bush

Hampton did interior design work for Jacqueline Kennedy Onassis, and designed the White House Christmas decorations in 1977 for President Jimmy Carter. He worked for President George H. W. Bush and First Lady Barbara Bush, providing interior design services at the White House (in the Oval Office and executive residence); at Camp David; at the family's vacation home in Kennebunkport, Maine; at their retirement home in Houston, Texas; and at the George Bush Presidential Library and Museum in Texas. In 1988, Hampton and Mario Buatta (with Buatta assisted by Scott Salvator) redecorated Blair House, which serves as the president's guest house. In 1989, Hampton completed a renovation of the American Academy in Rome's historic Villa Aurelia, including the installation of "elaborate silk draperies" and the restoration of over 300 pieces of antique furniture. In 1998, Hampton and Kaki Hockersmith renovated the State Dining Room at the White House for First Lady Hillary Clinton.

In addition to interior design commissions, Hampton licensed his designs in fabrics, trimmings, and furniture. He produced fabric designs for Kravet and a line of fabric trimmings for Scalamandre. In 1988, Hampton began designing a line of furniture for the Hickory Chair company, which produced 250 reproduction furniture styles designed by Hampton at the time of his death. The brand continued its partnership with Mark Hampton, LLC until 2018.

His monthly columns for House & Garden were later compiled in the book Mark Hampton on Decorating. He was a member and trustee of the American Academy in Rome. The Academy awards a prize in his honor every year. He was a member of the American Society of Interior Designers and a member of the Committee for the Preservation of the White House.

== Design philosophy ==
Hampton was uninterested in being known for a personal style, however his style has been described as "tailored and classical." As his career progressed, his style evolved from modern and minimalist to a more traditional aesthetic. Hampton considered himself an Anglophile, and was best known for British decor at the height of his career, with an affinity for "English country house colors, Oriental rugs, floral chintzes, eighteenth- and nineteenth-century antiques, both English and American, and botanical and architectural prints."

Hampton has been called "the Cary Grant of design...an urbane and articulate man, and impeccably dressed." In 1991 he was listed on the International Best Dressed List. Hampton was socially gifted and a thoughtful friend who created watercolor sketches for those he cared about. His watercolor of the White House Green Room was featured on President Reagan's and the First Lady's holiday greeting card in 1983.

Hampton believed that "interior decoration is not just about buying things, but helping people with how to use things of beauty." He preferred to work with clients who had their own collections and personal tastes, bringing them into the design, rather than imposing his specific designs on a space. Hampton said that "a room should look great and reflect the owner at the same time. An ideal room walks off with the people."

== Bibliography ==
=== By Mark Hampton ===
- Mark Hampton. Mark Hampton on decorating (New York: Random House, 1989).
- Mark Hampton. Legendary decorators of the twentieth century (New York: Doubleday, 1992).
- Albert Hadley, Mark Hampton (contributor). Albert Hadley: drawings and the drawing process (New York: New York School of Interior Design, 2004).

=== Mark Hampton ===
- Duane Hampton. Mark Hampton: the art of friendship (New York: Cliff Street Books, 2001).
- Duane Hampton. Mark Hampton: an American decorator (New York: Rizzoli, 2010).
