= 19 East 54th Street =

Building in Manhattan, New York

Minnie E. Young House
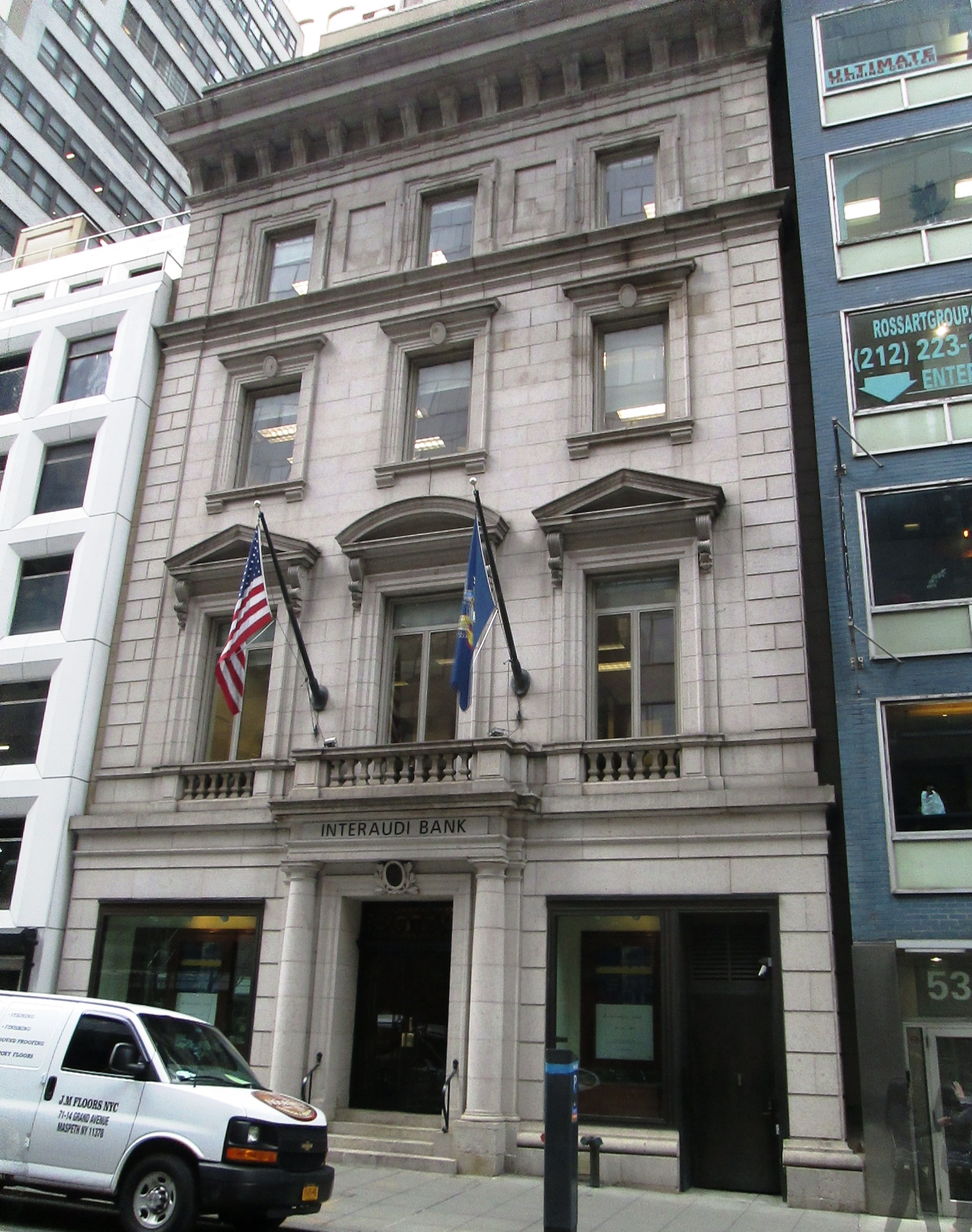
- Seen from the south
- Interactive map of the Minnie E. Young House area

General information
- Location: 19 East 54th Street, Manhattan, New York, US
- Coordinates: 40°45′39″N 73°58′27″W
- Current tenants: Interaudi Bank
- Construction started: 1899
- Completed: 1900
- Client: Minnie E. Young

Technical details
- Floor count: 6

Design and construction
- Architect: Hiss and Weekes

New York City Landmark
- Designated: November 22, 2016
- Reference no.: 2577

19 East 54th Street, originally the Minnie E. Young House, is a commercial building in the Midtown Manhattan neighborhood of New York City. It is along 54th Street's northern sidewalk between Madison Avenue and Fifth Avenue. The building was designed by Philip Hiss and H. Hobart Weekes of the firm Hiss and Weekes. It was constructed between 1899 and 1900 as a private residence for Minnie Edith Arents Young.

The house was designed as a palazzo in the Italian Renaissance Revival style. The 54th Street facade was designed as a four-story structure with a rusticated first story and decorated windows on the upper stories. Because 19 East 54th Street was wider than other houses in the area, the architectural details were designed to be more imposing. The penthouse at the fifth and sixth stories is recessed from the street. The interior was ornately outfitted with a coffered ceiling, a stained-glass conservatory, and staircases with oak paneling.

Young commissioned the house after her uncle Lewis Ginter, the founder of the American Tobacco Company, died in 1897 and left her a large bequest. Young leased the home to "Lucille" Lady Duff Gordon in 1920. The house was subsequently occupied by antiques trader Arthur S. Vernay from 1925 to 1943, then by the English-Speaking Union until 1956. Hairdresser Mr. Kenneth operated a salon in the building from 1963 until 1990, when the house's interior was severely damaged by fire. The building was then renovated and has served as Bank Audi's U.S. headquarters since 1993. The New York City Landmarks Preservation Commission designated 19 East 54th Street as an official landmark in 2016.

== Site ==
The Minnie E. Young House is at 19 East 54th Street in the Midtown Manhattan neighborhood of New York City. It is on the north side of 54th Street between Madison Avenue to the east and Fifth Avenue to the west. The land lot covers 4,201 square feet (390.3 m^{2}) with a frontage of 41.67 feet (12.70 m) on 54th Street and a depth of 100.42 feet (30.61 m). Nearby sites include the William H. Moore House at 4 East 54th Street and the Aeolian Building to the west; the St. Regis New York hotel to the northwest; 550 Madison Avenue one block north; the DuMont Building to the southeast; and Paley Park one block south.

Fifth Avenue between 42nd Street and Central Park South (59th Street) was relatively undeveloped through the late 19th century. The surrounding area was once part of the common lands of the city of New York. The Commissioners' Plan of 1811 established Manhattan's street grid with lots measuring 100 feet (30 m) deep and 25 feet (7.6 m) wide. Upscale residences were constructed around Fifth Avenue following the American Civil War. The block of East 54th Street from Fifth to Madison Avenues was only sporadically developed until the late 1870s, and it had brownstone residences by 1886. Residents of the block included developer William Earl Dodge Stokes at 4 East 54th and merchant John R. Platt at 7 East 54th. On the next block west were the residences of John D. Rockefeller at 4 West 54th, John D. Rockefeller Jr. at 10 West 54th, and Philip Lehman at 7 West 54th.

== Architecture ==
19 East 54th Street is designed in the Italian Renaissance Revival style by Philip Hiss and H. Hobart Weekes of the firm Hiss and Weekes. It is six stories tall, although only four stories are directly visible on the street. With a width of 40 feet (12 m), the house is wider than other townhouses in the area, which typically measured 25 by 100 feet (7.6 by 30.5 m). Russell Sturgis, writing for Architectural Record in 1900, described 19 East 54th Street as being well proportioned because its increased width allowed more imposing design features. According to Sturgis, "if one were to wish for a fairly good idea embodied in solid construction of those villini which the Florentines have been building diligently during the last twenty years, he would find it in this front."

=== Facade ===
The main facade on 54th Street is four stories tall with three bays of vertical openings. Below the ground story is a granite water table with bead molding. The first story is faced with rusticated stone blocks, and it contains bronze-framed display windows on the left and right bays. The main entrance is through a portico in the center bay, with engaged columns flanking a slightly recessed doorway. The doorway itself is set within a carved-stone frame and is topped by a cartouche. A balustrade runs across the bottom of the second story. The windows on that story are topped by pediments that are supported by scrolled brackets. The second-story and third-story windows are flanked by rusticated piers that support a cornice above the third story. The fourth story has recessed panels between the windows and is topped by a large stone cornice with brackets.

The fifth and sixth stories, added in 1960 and 1993 respectively, are hidden behind the fourth-floor cornice. These stories form a penthouse that is clad with parged brick and concrete. The house's west and east facades are not visible from the street.

=== Interior ===
According to the New York City Department of City Planning, the house has a gross floor area of 25,971 square feet (2,412.8 m^{2}). It is one of several "American basement plan" residences on 54th Street, where the entrance is placed at ground level, rather than on a stoop slightly above ground as in other rowhouses. This type of design enabled the ground-floor reception area to have a central staircase, rather than on one side. Inside the house, a broad staircase connects the first and second stories. The interior was originally designed like Renaissance Revival palazzos. Inside the second floor was a parlor that was a common space for guests. The third and fourth floors served as the private rooms. The interior was ornately decorated with a coffered ceiling, a stained-glass conservatory, and rooms with oak paneling. The rooms also had modillioned cornices.

When the house was turned into the salon of hairdresser Mr. Kenneth, the interior was richly decorated throughout with flowered carpet and red-and-yellow paisley pattern fabrics. The original salon interior was a rare commercial project undertaken by the interior decorator Billy Baldwin. Mr. Kenneth's salon was redesigned in 1985 with red walls, painted clouds on the ceiling, Parts of the original interior design persisted through at least 1990, when the salon was severely damaged by fire.

== History ==
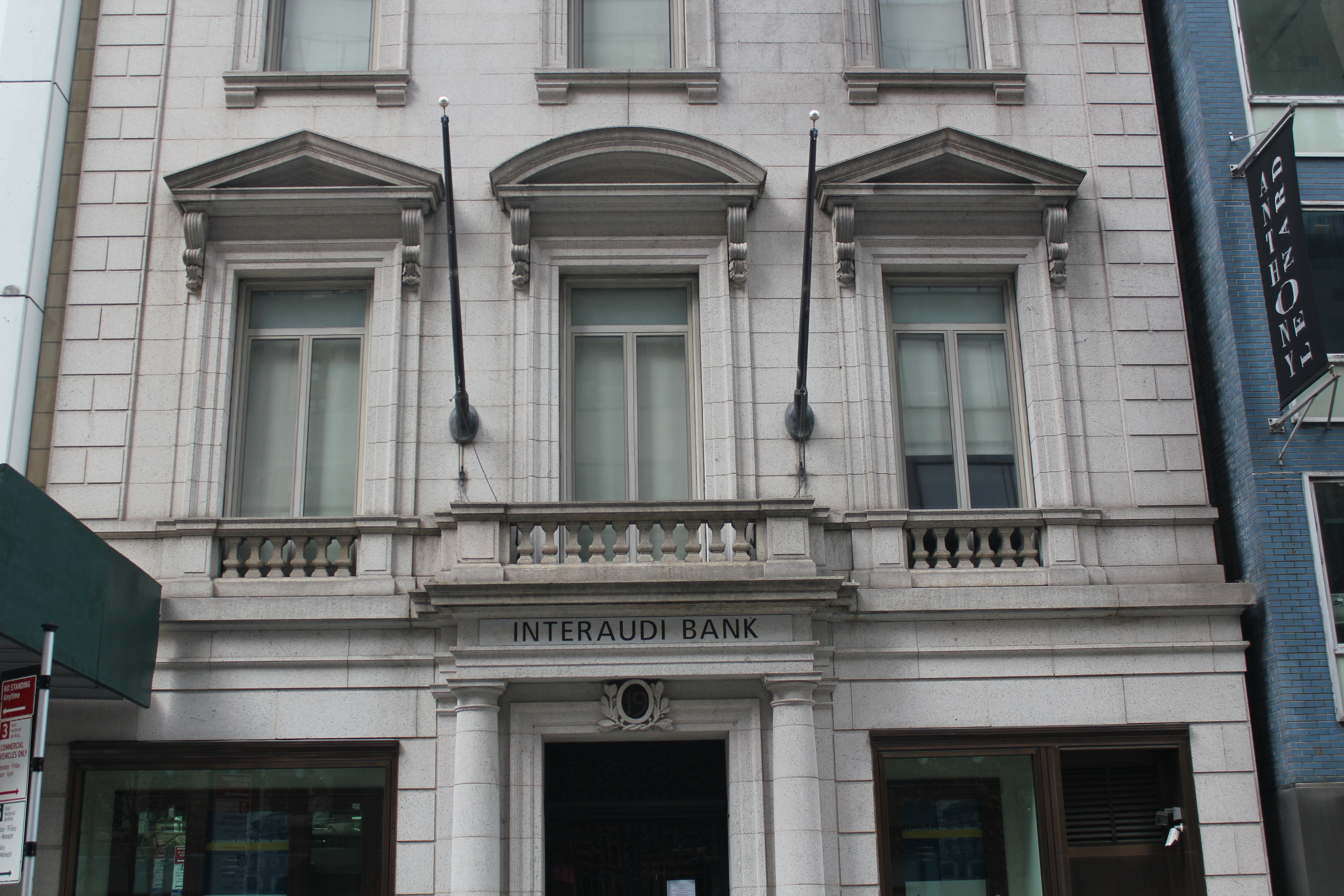
Second-story detail

The residence was commissioned for Minnie Edith Young (née Arents), born in 1855 and married to stockbroker Albert Young. The Youngs had three children: Albert, Lewis, and Edna. Minnie Young was a scion of the prominent Arents family in Richmond, Virginia; her uncle Lewis Ginter was the founder of the American Tobacco Company, while her sister Grace Arents was a Richmond philanthropist. Minnie was widowed when Albert died in 1895. When Minnie's uncle Lewis died two years later, he left her a substantial bequest.

=== Residence ===
In 1899, John and Elizabeth Kearny sold two lots at 17 and 19 East 54th Street to Minnie Young. That March, Young commissioned Hiss and Weekes to design an upscale residence. The architects selected the Italian Renaissance Revival style for its classical design attributes. The house was officially completed in the next year, but it went relatively unnoticed afterward. According to a 1990 article in The New York Times, the building was last mentioned in a print publication in 1900, when the American Architect and Building News ran a picture with a caption that denoted its client as a "Mr. Young".

Minnie Young initially lived in the house with her son Lewis and sister Johanna Arents, as well as a variety of servants. Minnie and Johanna's brother George Arents also lived in the house for a short time. The New York Times wrote that the servants included a "butler, cook, laundress, kitchen maid, [and] parlor maid", as well as Pleasant Read, a "hallman". The house hosted events such as the wedding of Edna Young to Alfred E. Dieterich in April 1900, as well as a fundraiser of the Junior Auxiliary to the New York Diet Kitchen Association in 1913. The surrounding neighborhood rapidly became a commercial zone after World War I, and Minnie Young moved to 420 Park Avenue in 1920, though she retained ownership of the house until her death in 1933.

=== Mid-20th century ===
In November 1920, Young leased the house to Lucille Ltd. for twenty-one years. The firm, headed by dressmaker Lady Duff Gordon, catered to upper-class clients. The next month, Mott B. Schmidt filed plans to remove partitions, add rooms, and rearrange spaces in the building for $20,000. Schmidt turned the house into a showroom. By March 1921, the renovations were complete and Lucille was paying $50,000 annually in rent. A little more than one year after the lease was signed, in March 1922, Lucille's creditors forced the company into receivership. Lucille's attorney characterized the "embarrassment of the company" (as it was described in The New York Times) as being partially caused by the relocation to 19 East 54th Street.

Starting in 1925, the house was leased for a long term to a client represented by Augustus H. Skillin. The client in question was English antiques collector Arthur S. Vernay, whose company sold antiques and decorative artworks. Vernay bought the house outright from the estate of Minnie Young in 1933; at the time, the building was valued at about $450,000 for taxation purposes. The purchase reportedly was made for $312,500, but this value was not confirmed. During the 1930s, the Vernay gallery was used for multiple events, such as a show of English antique furniture, a needle-art show with work by artists such as former U.S. first lady Edith Roosevelt, a Tibetan-artifact exhibition to benefit a children's school, and an exhibition of English clockmakers' art. The house was sold in September 1937 to Frederick Brown, who resold it to Charles F. Noyes. Though Vernay retired in 1941, the business continued to operate at 19 East 54th Street. The house was acquired by the Bank for Savings in May 1941.

The building was sold in 1943 to the English-Speaking Union (ESU) for use as that organization's United States headquarters. The purchase, conducted entirely in cash, was funded partly by a gift of $60,000 toward the organization. The purchase was intended to provide adequate space for the ESU, whose American operation was then headquartered at nearby 30 Rockefeller Plaza. The Lawyers Title Corporation of New York insured the property title in the purchase. The ESU's new headquarters opened in May 1944. The building had enough space for the ESU's offices, including those of the United Nations Officers Club, Committee for Overseas Children, and War Relief Workroom. In addition, the building was used for events, such as exhibits of British veterans' products, early-20th century English art, and a needlework tapestry in memory of the Battle of Britain.

The ESU ultimately sold the building in 1956 to Henry Payson and relocated the next year to a new home on 69th Street. The sale was not finalized until 1958 because of a lawsuit over delays in the sale. Payson had initially refused to take the title because of these delays, saying that the building's entrance portico and underground vaults projected slightly into the street. The New York Supreme Court ruled that the ESU was entitled to demand specific performance; namely, Payson was obligated to take the title.

=== Late 20th century to present ===
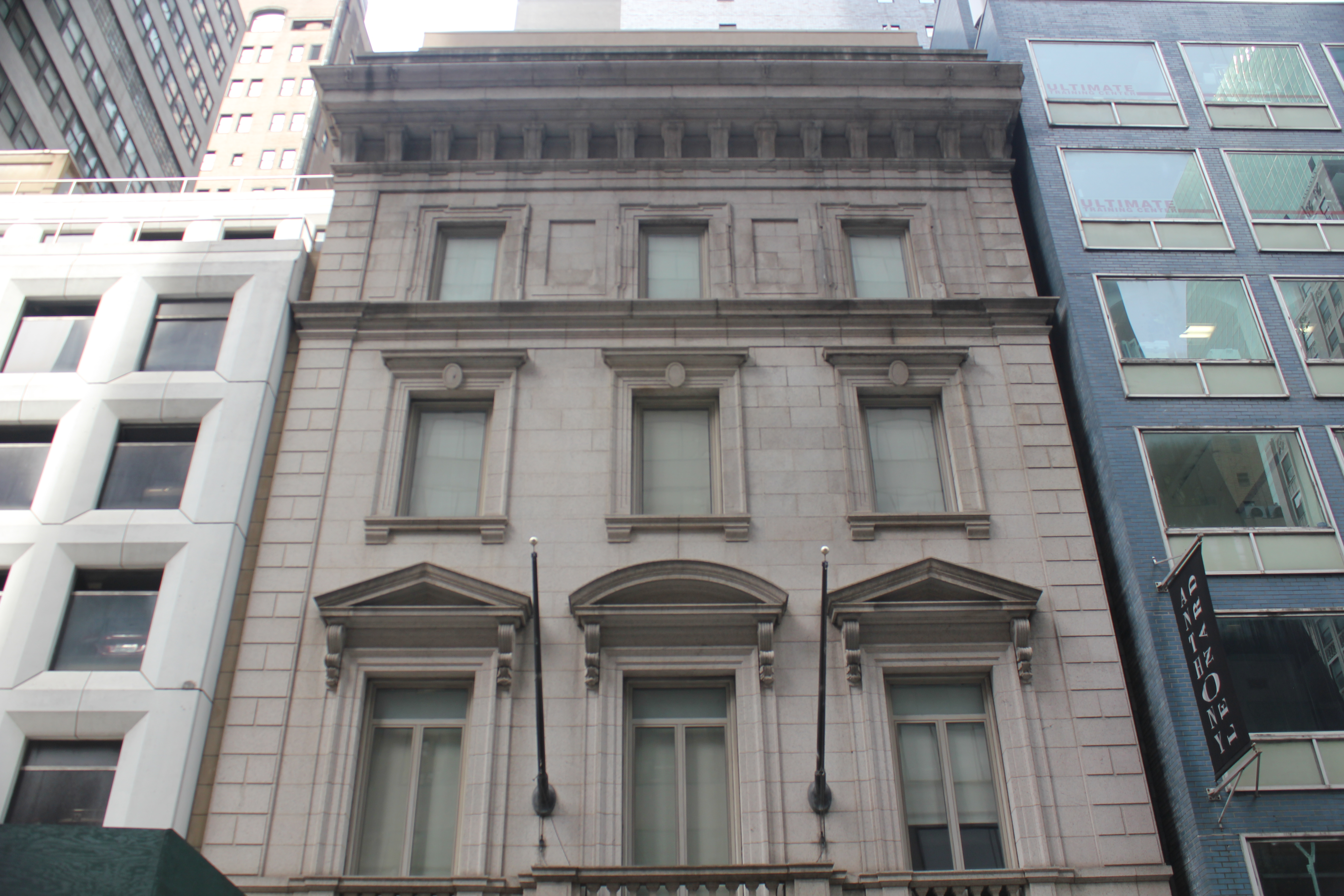
Upper story detail

Mr. Kenneth signed a 50-year lease in the building in 1962, backed by salon-and-beauty-supply firm Glemby Company. After Billy Baldwin renovated the interior, the salon officially opened on March 4, 1963. It had a wig boutique and special cold storage for fur coats on the first floor; drying rooms on the second floor; washing and styling rooms on the third floor; and massage rooms, steam baths, waxing chambers, whirlpool spas, and a Pilates studio on the fourth floor. Clients could have manicures and pedicures while being served lunch or tea, and a Mercedes car was on call to bring clients to the salon or take them home afterward. Some women would drop in simply for lunch, or to sit and leaf through magazines while enjoying the relaxed, club-like atmosphere.

By 1985, the salon was starting to become aged. That year, it was closed for one month and the house was renovated for $1.3 million. The main room's furniture was redesigned and a pedicure room was added. Part of the main floor was subdivided for a men's division, with specially designed chairs. A New York Times article describing the 1985 renovation referred to Mr. Kenneth as an "institution". The salon burned down on May 16, 1989, when a fire arose on the third floor and ultimately destroyed the rear of the second and third floors. The fire was extinguished after four hours with the help of 125 firefighters. The damage was extensive enough to uncover large portions of the original decoration work. As a result of the fire, Kenneth Salon relocated to the Palace Hotel. Kenneth said later, "There had never been anything like [the 54th Street salon] before, and nothing like it will ever exist again."

For over a year, the house sat empty and no restoration work was performed. The owner of 19 East 54th Street, Donald J. Gordon, was planning to rebuild the house, and Kenneth Salon's lease was effectively terminated. While Kenneth Salon's lease ran until 2010, a "fire or earthquake" clause allowed the owner of a severely damaged building to end a lease if they wished to demolish or rebuild it. Gordon spent $1.2 million to refurbish the interior, adding an elevator and mechanical areas to designs by Emery Roth & Sons. The existing stories were extended to the rear and a sixth story was added. Gordon then sought a tenant who could sign a net lease, thereby assuming the maintenance and upkeep costs.

Bank Audi leased the house by 1993; it had initially wanted to buy the house, but the owner did not want to sell it. The wide facade enabled Bank Audi to add offices and a conference room lit by large windows. In addition, the bank installed its name over the entrance portico. The bank became the InterAudi Bank in 2003. When the New York City Landmarks Preservation Commission (LPC) started considering buildings in Midtown for city landmark status in 2013, including the Minnie Young House, a group of development organizations wrote a report advising against a landmark designation for the house, saying it was "now isolated and lacks the context that would enhance its value". In mid-2016, the LPC proposed protecting twelve buildings in East Midtown, including 19 East 54th Street, in advance of proposed changes to the area's zoning. On November 22, 2016, the LPC designated 19 East 54th Street and ten other nearby buildings as city landmarks.

== See also ==
- List of New York City Designated Landmarks in Manhattan from 14th to 59th Streets
