= Romeo Gigli =

Italian fashion designer (born 1949)

- Born: 1949 (age 76–77); Castel Bolognese, Italy
- Occupation: Fashion designer

Romeo Gigli (born 1949) is an Italian fashion designer who was described in the late 1980s as singlehandedly changing the course of fashion by the Los Angeles Times.

== Early life ==
Gigli was born in Castel Bolognese. Orphaned at the age of 18, he went travelling for the next decade, eventually finding his way to New York City in 1977, where he frequented the nightclub Studio 54 and met Bianca Jagger. His style in New York was admired and he was asked to consult on fashion for the designer Piero Dimitri.

== Career ==
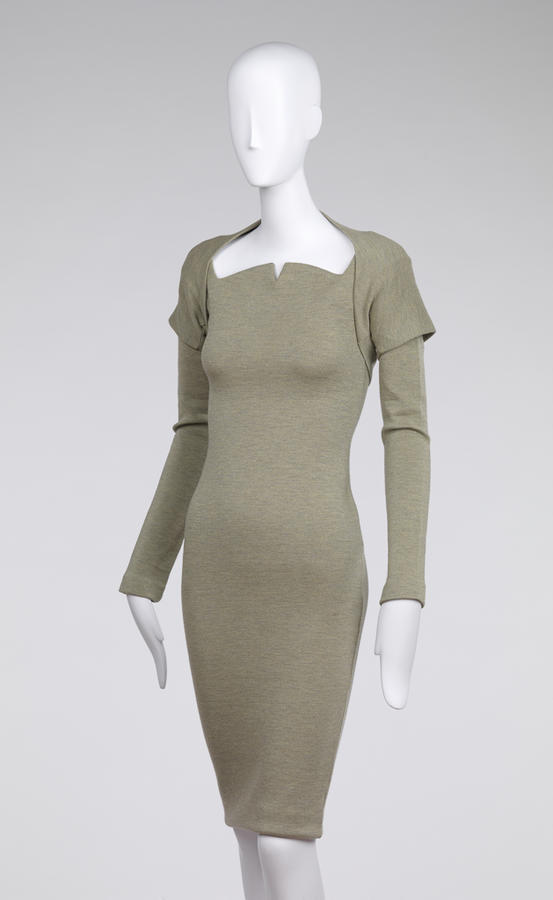
Romeo Gigli knit dress and shrug, 1990s

Returning to Italy, Gigli studied fashion before establishing his first label in 1981. This failed three years later, at which point he established a partnership with Carla Sozzani.

In 1985, a 25-piece collection was shown in Milan. This was bought by the high end fashion retailers Browns in South Molton Street, London and Joyce in Hong Kong. By 1986, Gigli was gaining a strong international reputation and influenced other designers with what the Los Angeles Times described as "soft look, body-hugging dresses with draped bubble skirts".

Gigli's original base on Corso Como, Milan was joined by stores in Manhattan and the Marais area of Paris. His collections also moved from Milan to Paris. Shortly before his Paris debut in 1989, Vogue had declared that Gigli was the: “leading force in a new generation of designers proclaiming a different fashion sensibility".

=== Brand hallmarks ===
His understated design romanticism, featuring shawl collars, dropped shoulders and narrow fitted trousers or tulip-shaped skirts worn with flat shoes were seen as the antithesis of the 1980s power dressing trend and some predicted he would become the Armani of the 1990s. His designs were replicated on the high street and he developed a lucrative perfume range. Alexander McQueen was among his fashion assistants, joining the designer in 1989.

== 1990s on ==
A dispute with his business partners in 1991 meant Gigli lost control of parts of the Gigli brand. He continued to collaborate with other designers and retail brands, including Barneys New York, Callaghan, Donghia and Louis Vuitton, also teaching fashion in Milan. In 2012, a Romeo Gigli collaboration with Joyce was made available online and at Calle de Ridotto, Venice. Gigli served as artistic director for CP Company in Italy with a strong Japan market until 1997. He now lives in Marrakech Morocco, where he is collaborating with El Fenn, according to luxury travel magazine.
