= Kalkin House (Shelburne Museum) =

- Former names: Collector's House

General information
- Type: Museum exhibition building
- Completed: 2000

Technical details
- Structural system: Shipping container architecture
- Floor count: 2
- Floor area: 2000 sq. ft.

Design and construction
- Architect: Adam Kalkin

The Kalkin House was an exhibition building at Shelburne Museum, Shelburne, Vermont. Designed by New Jersey–based architect and artist Adam Kalkin, it opened on June 1, 2001. The prefabricated building was made of three trans-oceanic shipping containers housed within a commercially produced metal shell, supplied by Cameron Construction Company, Ferrisburgh, Vermont. The two-story structure also included two glass garage doors and a pair of metal grid balconies. The balcony on the north side of the house projects from the wall, and is thus described by Kalkin as the "male" side of the house.

== History ==
Though the building never served as a home, it was appointed like one, having two bedrooms each with an associated bathroom, and a central kitchen in the main living space with a sink and refrigerator in the island near the western door. One bedroom was to the south of the main living area on the first floor. The other bedroom was on the second floor on the north end of the house. The south end second floor consisted of a sitting room/office with a half-bath.

When it was first opened to the public in 2001, Kalkin House was named the Collector's House, envisioned as a 21st-century historic house museum. In order to tie the contemporary architecture to the rest of Shelburne Museum, interior designer Albert Hadley was commissioned to outfit the building with folk art from the museum's collection and furniture. That interior remained intact until 2006 when the structure was renamed Kalkin House and converted into a space for temporary exhibitions highlighting contemporary design, without removing the kitchen or bathroom fixtures from the structure. The 2006 Kalkin House exhibition Homey and Hip consisted of twenty pieces of household furniture on loan from Knoll with the stipulation that visitors could sit on the pieces. The interior was not portrayed as a domestic interior again until 2009 when Queens-based textile artist Richard Saja re-imagined the space with his installation The Bright and Shining Light of Irreverence: Richard Saja and the Historically Inaccurate School.

The structure was removed from the museum grounds in June 2012 by Engineers Construction (a Vermont-based civil contractor) that intends to reuse the building.

== Architect ==
Adam Kalkin (American, born 1963) graduated from Vassar College in 1984 and later studied at the Architectural Association School of Architecture in London. He was awarded a Young Architects Design Award from Progressive Architecture magazine in 1990. In 2005, his Push Button House was shown at Art Basel Miami Beach, and was re-configured as the Illy Café at the Venice Biennale in 2007.

== See also ==
- Deitch Projects
- Naked Heart Foundation
