= Angelo Donghia =

American interior designer (1935–1985)

Angelo Donghia

Angelo Donghia (March 7, 1935 – April 10, 1985) was an American interior designer known for his minimalist yet luxurious interiors, his entrepreneurial expansion into furniture, textiles, and licensing, and his influence on late 20th-century residential and corporate design.

== Early life and education ==
Donghia was born in Vandergrift, Pennsylvania, on March 7, 1935. He developed an early appreciation for design while spending time in his father’s tailoring shop, where at age 11 he completed his first decoration project. At 18, he moved to New York City to study interior design at the Parsons School of Design.

== Career ==
After graduating from Parsons, Donghia joined Yale R. Burge Interiors, where he quickly advanced and became Burge’s protégé. In 1966 he was commissioned, on the recommendation of Billy Baldwin, to design the Metropolitan Opera Club at Lincoln Center. The silver-foil ceilings, blue-glass chandeliers, and black upholstery of the project received widespread acclaim, and later that year Donghia became a partner at the firm, which was renamed Burge-Donghia.

In 1968 he co-founded &Vice Versa, a to-the-trade showroom of fabrics and wallcoverings inspired by designer Seymour Avigdor. After Burge’s death in 1972, the firm was renamed Donghia Associates. It expanded its work into residential, hospitality, and corporate interiors, and became one of the most prominent American design firms of the 1970s and 1980s.

=== Expansion ===
By the mid-1970s, Donghia launched several business ventures under his name, including showrooms (beginning in Los Angeles in 1976), Donghia Furniture (1978), and Donghia Textiles. He also licensed his designs for mass-market distribution, including successful sheet and towel collections for J.P. Stevens and affordable furniture for Kroehler.

=== Clients and projects ===
Donghia’s clients included Ralph Lauren, Halston, Diana Ross, Mary Tyler Moore, Barbara Walters, Donald Trump, Neil Simon, and Liza Minnelli, among others. Notable projects included the cruise ship SS Norway, Omni International Hotels in Miami and Atlanta, and corporate spaces such as PepsiCo headquarters.

== Design philosophy ==
Donghia’s aesthetic drew on the restrained modernism of Jean-Michel Frank. He favored comfort, simplicity, and “total environments,” creating cohesive spaces defined by gray flannel upholstery, overstuffed “fat” furniture, lacquered surfaces, and foil ceilings. His interiors were described as both minimal and elegant, with a strong sense of livability.

== Later years and death ==
At the time of his death in New York City on April 10, 1985, the Donghia Companies included five branches: Donghia Associates, Donghia Furniture, Donghia Textiles, Donghia Showrooms, and Donghia Licensing. He died at age 50 of complications related to AIDS.

== Legacy ==
After Donghia’s death, the company continued to operate, and in 2005 it was acquired by the Italian Rubelli Group. In 2020, Donghia filed for Chapter 7 bankruptcy and closed its showrooms. Later that year, Kravet Inc. acquired the brand and archives, and in 2021 relaunched Donghia collections. In 2023, Kravet introduced "Donghia II," a collection inspired by the archives but reinterpreted for modern interiors.

Donghia’s legacy also continues through the Angelo Donghia Foundation, which supports interior design education via scholarships and institutional donations, including facilities at Parsons School of Design and the Rhode Island School of Design.

== Awards and recognition ==
Donghia received numerous honors during his career, including the Tommy Award for Fabric Design, the Euster Merchandise Mart Award for Outstanding Leadership, and honorary doctorates from Parsons and The New School. He was posthumously inducted into the Interior Design Hall of Fame.

== Documentary ==
In 2016, the publication Editor at Large released a documentary on Donghia’s life and work, directed by Julia Noran Johnston. It featured interviews with Paige Rense, Joel Schumacher, Melvin Dwork, Mario Buatta, and other contemporaries.
