= Mr. Kenneth =

American hairdresser

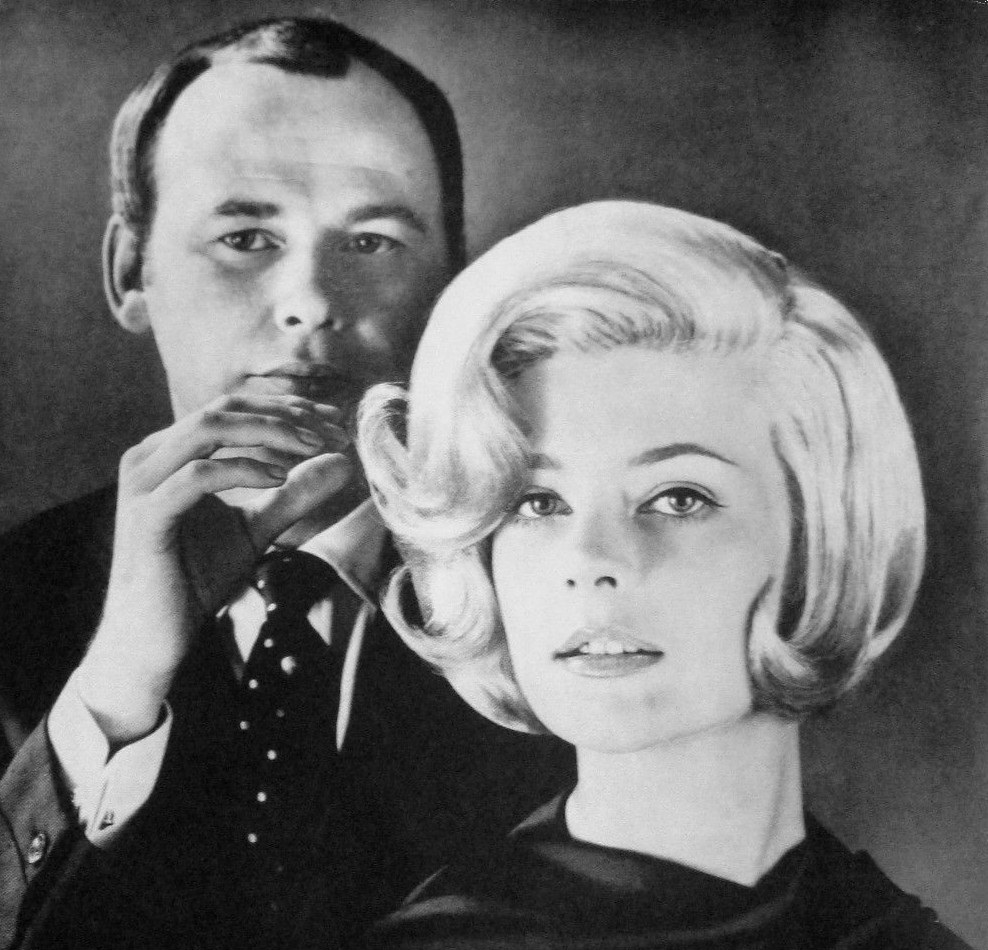
- Kenneth at work in 1962
- Born: Kenneth Everette Battelle; April 19, 1927; Syracuse, New York
- Died: May 12, 2013 (aged 86); Wappingers Falls, New York
- Occupation: Hairdresser

Kenneth Everette Battelle (April 19, 1927 – May 12, 2013), more usually known as Mr. Kenneth, was an American hairdresser from the 1950s until his death. Sometimes described as the world's first celebrity hairdresser, Kenneth achieved international fame for creating Jacqueline Kennedy's bouffant in 1961. He counted Marilyn Monroe, Audrey Hepburn, and many of America's most high-profile socialites such as Brooke Astor and Happy Rockefeller among his clients. In 1961 he became the first, and only, hairdresser to win a Coty Award.

== Early life and education ==
Kenneth Everette Battelle was born in Syracuse, New York, the eldest son with four younger sisters. His father was a shoe salesman, who divorced his mother when Kenneth was 12, leaving their son to support his family through cooking and washing dishes, selling beer and working as an elevator operator. Aged 17, he joined the navy for eighteen months, after which he studied liberal arts at Syracuse University for six months (which was all his G.I. Bill funding allowed for) before dropping out when the funds ran out. After seeing an advertisement for the Wanamaker Academy of Beauty in New York that promised graduates $100-a-week jobs, he studied there for 6 months, supporting himself by working for a restaurant and playing the piano in a local bar. After this, he studied further at the Marinello Academy of Beauty Culture in Syracuse, before finding a job at the Starlet Beauty Bar salon opposite the Greyhound bus station.

== Hairdressing career up to 1963 ==
Kenneth was at the Starlet Beauty Bar for four years, where he developed a well-received 1930s-inspired variation on the bob cut called the 'club cut'. After this, in October 1949, he went to Miami to work in a hotel salon. On July 1, 1950, Kenneth moved to Manhattan, New York, where he was offered a job by Elizabeth Arden in Lexington, Kentucky. Rather than move out of New York so soon after moving there, he went to Helena Rubinstein at 52nd and Fifth instead, for whom he worked for the next five years.

=== Helena Rubinstein ===
While at Rubinstein, Kenneth styled the hair of models and individuals from the media, who Rubinstein insisted be coiffed for free in exchange for publicity and magazine credits. He first met Jacqueline Kennedy through Rubinstein in 1954, when the newly-wed Mrs. Kennedy dropped in to see her usual hairdresser, Lawrence, and found he was off work sick. Kenneth stepped in, and by suggesting his unknown-to-him client grow out her unflattering short, layered and curly "Italian cut" hairstyle, he and Kennedy embarked upon a successful client-and-stylist partnership. For Kennedy he had extra-large Lucite hair rollers specially made in order to stretch out her hair and lengthen it, and give her a softer hairstyle, in stark contrast to the more typical heavily permed, lacklustre hairstyles many women were receiving, which Kenneth called "washed-and-ironed". Rather than imitate these immobile coiffures, Kenneth wanted to give Kennedy and his other clients soft-looking, lustrous, full heads of hair that resembled fabric and reflected light, and that moved with the client's head yet fell back into shape. It was important to him that his clients should be able to wash their own hair and be able to maintain their appearance themselves.

After Helena Rubinstein, where Kenneth worked for five years, he went on to Lilly Daché's nine-story hatmaking emporium on 56th Street.

=== Lilly Daché ===
One of the leading milliners of New York, Daché had realised that hats were going out of fashion, and had added an extravagant pink-and-white salon to her building in order to attract a different type of customer. Kenneth was employed to head up the salon, which became the most important hairdressing venue in New York. Among the clients who came to Lilly Daché for hairdos were Lucille Ball, who called Kenneth "God", and the actress Kay Kendall, who in 1957, was steered towards Kenneth by Lilly Daché's house model, Gillis McGil. Kenneth rescued her overdyed red hair, which Kendall said made her "look like Danny Kaye in drag", cutting it short and tinting it back to the original color, creating a coiffure that became an international sensation, with many women queueing outside the salon to have their hair done the same way.

The next year, in 1958, the couturier Norman Norell sent Marilyn Monroe along to see Kenneth after she complained that excessive bleaching and perming was making her hair fall out. Kenneth softened, smoothed and straightened Monroe's hair, and became her hairdresser of choice while she lived in New York, and traveled with her to Chicago for the Some Like It Hot premiere in March 1959. He became a close friend of Monroe's.

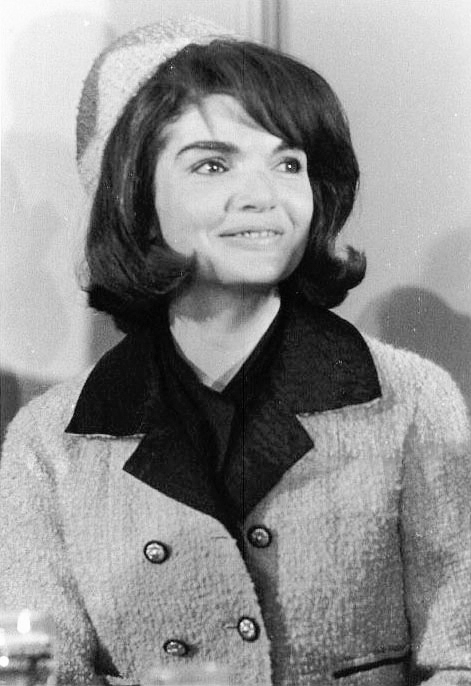
Jacqueline Kennedy, November 1963

==== "Secretary of Grooming" to the Kennedy administration ====
Among Kenneth's regular clients was Karlys Daly Brown, the beauty editor for Glamour, who in 1961 commissioned Kenneth to write articles on how women could care for their own hair, and, uniquely for a hairdresser, featured him on Glamour's front cover. The idea that a hairdresser would write how-to articles was quite controversial at the time, with his colleagues saying he would destroy their business. In addition, since the inauguration of John F. Kennedy on January 20, 1961, Kenneth had been "Secretary of Grooming" to the Kennedy administration. This made him a household name, and a recognizable celebrity whose name on magazine covers ensured a boost in sales. His hairstyles were a key part of Jacqueline Kennedy's look, with judicious use of hairspray to ensure that her hair did not readily blow out of position, but just enough loose tendrils to avoid a wholly immobile look. Jacqueline's hairstyle was described as a "grown-up exaggeration of little girls' hair", and cited as evidence for Kenneth having "killed off the hat". It was Kenneth who cut and styled Kennedy's hair just before the assassination of John F. Kennedy on November 22, 1963.

In 1963 Kenneth left Lilly Daché and opened his own salon at 19 East 54th Street.

== 1963-1990 ==
In 1962 Kenneth found his ideal backer in the form of the Glemby Company, who were a salon-and-beauty-supply firm, and took out the lease on 19 East 54th Street. The salon, simply known as Kenneth, officially opened on March 4, 1963.

The interior, which was richly decorated throughout with flowered carpet and red-and-yellow paisley pattern fabrics, was a rare commercial project undertaken by the interior decorator Billy Baldwin, who was told to create a circus atmosphere with patterns upon patterns. Designed for maximum pampering, clients (who might have waited up to three months for an appointment) would find a wig boutique, special cold storage for fur coats, massage rooms, steam baths and waxing chambers, whirlpool spas and a Pilates studio, in addition to special rooms for washing, drying, and styling hair. In addition to these amenities, clients could have manicures and pedicures while being served lunch or tea, and a Mercedes car was on call to bring clients to the salon or take them home afterwards. Some women would drop in simply for lunch, or to sit and leaf through magazines while enjoying the relaxed, club-like atmosphere.

For a while Kenneth enjoyed the celebrity lifestyle, being considered equivalent to an A-list celebrity, although he was always discreet about his many celebrity clients and any revelations they may have made. In an interview with Vanity Fair in 2003, Kenneth stated that although he used to enjoy attending social events, a headline in a mid-1960s issue of the New York Journal-American reading "Pickle Queen goes to Yacht Party With Hairdresser" upset him and led to his decision to avoid going out with his clients again.

In 1974 he opened a second salon in Atlanta which was patronised by Rosalynn Carter, among others.

In 1986, Thomas Morrissey, Kenneth's colorist, opened his own salon, taking with him many members of Kenneth's staff as well as some of his clients, including Jacqueline Kennedy Onassis. Despite this, clients such as Grace Mirabella and Kitty D'Alessio, the President of Chanel, remained loyal to Kenneth.

Kenneth's New York salon was destroyed by fire on May 16, 1990.

== After 1990 ==
Following the fire, despite hoping to rebuild the business, Kenneth was evicted from his old salon due to a fire-or-earthquake clause held by his landlords. In addition to this, it emerged that the company was not an S corporation, meaning he would have had to pay both personal and corporate tax on any insurance money, effectively cancelling out any reimbursement.

Kenneth rented six chairs in a beauty parlor in the Helmsley Palace Hotel for two years, followed by one third of his staff, and after two years, relocated to the Waldorf-Astoria hotel. Although on a much smaller scale than the original salon, the Waldorf-Astoria establishment retained many of the pampering touches such as finger sandwiches for clients and free bottles of nail polish to accompany manicures.

In 2002 Kenneth chose Kevin Lee, employed as a stylist since 1987, to be his creative director and regenerate the salon to attract a younger clientele. Lee maintains the Kenneth tradition of offering hairstyles that clients can maintain themselves. While Lee manages the salon, Kenneth was still doing haircuts in 2008.

Kenneth died on May 12, 2013, at his home in Wappingers Falls, New York. He was 86.
