= Eleanor Brown (interior designer) =

American interior designer (1890–1991)

- Born: Eleanor Stockstrom; February 12, 1890; St. Louis, Missouri, US
- Died: January 30, 1991 (aged 100); Manhattan, New York City, US
- Education: Parsons School of Design
- Occupations: Interior designer, businesswoman
- Years active: 1924–1991
- Spouse: Archibald Brown (m. 1934)

Eleanor Stockstrom McMillen Brown (born Eleanor Stockstrom; February 12, 1890 – January 30, 1991) was an American interior designer and businesswoman. She founded the design firm McMillen's and was described as a "pioneer in her field" by The New York Times.

== Biography ==
Brown was born on February 12, 1890, in St. Louis, the daughter of Louis Stockstrom, the founder of Magic Chef. She studied interior design at the New York School of Fine and Applied Art – now Parsons School of Design – after encouragement from a friend, as well as at secretarial schools. After graduating in 1920, William M. Odom, her teacher, suggested she start an interior design firm. In 1924, she founded McMillen's using $13,000 or $15,000 of funds, either her own or borrowed from her father, which she repaid within three years. Writer Erica Brown (no relation) credited McMillen's as ''the first professional full-service interior decorating firm in America".

Odom remained a mentor and business partner throughout Brown's career. She remained active with Parsons, hiring many its graduates. She frequently lectured and awarded scholarships to students. A member of its advisory board, she became a trustee in 1940, serving on its board of trustees from 1942 to 1948. In 1956, she received a medal from them.

An early interior design project of Brown was redecorating the house of Edwin Vernon Morgan, the United States ambassador to Brazil. She was awarded the Legion of Honour in 1951 or 1952. In 1963, she redecorated the Blair House at the request of First Lady Jacqueline Kennedy Onassis, then did the same for the Executive Residence during the presidency of Lyndon B. Johnson. She also designed the residences of Winthrop W. Aldrich, C. Douglas Dillon, Charles W. Engelhard Jr., Marshall Field, Henry Ford II, Arthur A. Houghton Jr., Henry Cabot Lodge Jr., William S. Paley, Marjorie Merriweather Post, and Henry Huttleston Rogers, among others. In 1976, she retired as president and became chair of his board; Betty Sherrill succeeded her as president. She traveled to her office daily until age 85.

Before Brown, woman interior designers decorated "without much direction or point of view", as put by Albert Hadley, who worked under her. In her obituary in The New York Times, she was described as having "a talent for creating a look that was at once restrained and elegant". She was described as having a "clear, strong-minded vision" by Mark Hampton, who worked under her. He was known for her attention to detail, which in her obituary, was attributed to Grace Fakes, a Parsons secretary who was named a source of Brown's reputation for detail by The New York Times.

Brown married engineer Drury McMillen in 1911, and they traveled a lot, primarily to South America. They divorced in 1932, and in 1934, she married architect Archibald Brown. She had one son. From 1928, she lived in a duplex in Manhattan, the interior of which she barely changed from the 1920s. She died on January 20, 1991, aged 100, in Manhattan. Since January 2023, a biographical collection has been held by The New School.
