= Ruby Ross Wood =

American interior decorator

Ruby Ross Wood (26 October 1881 – 18 February 1950) was a prominent New York interior decorator and the owner of Ruby Ross Wood, Inc., a decorating company launched in the 1920s.

== Background ==
She was born Ruby Ross Pope in Monticello, Georgia, the eldest daughter of a cotton broker and a descendant of several families prominent in America since Colonial times, including the Washingtons of Virginia and the Carrolls of Maryland.

Her first husband was Wallace Field Goodnow, an engineer from a well-known Cape Cod, Massachusetts family; by him, she had one son, Philip, who died as an infant. Her second husband was Chalmers Wood, a socially well-connected stockbroker and fox hunter. They lived at Little Ipswich, an estate in Syosset, New York, which had been designed for them by the architect William Adams Delano. The house and outbuildings of the 29-acre (120,000 m^{2}) property were leveled in the early 1990s and replaced by a 21-home housing development now known as Pironi Estates.

== Career as journalist and interior decorator ==
Wood began her professional life as a journalist. After moving to New York City and later Boston in the early 1900s and using the byline Ruby Ross Goodnow (her first married name), she wrote fiction, poetry, and articles about interior design for The Delineator, a popular women's magazine, where her editor was Theodore Dreiser. She also wrote a well-regarded series of articles about architecture that became the basis of an equally popular book, The Honest House. Her Delineator articles under the byline of the interior decorator Elsie de Wolfe formed the basis of de Wolfe's decorating manual The House in Good Taste, for which Goodnow also was the ghostwriter. She also ghostwrote de Wolfe's Ladies Home Journal articles, which later were adapted for The House in Good Taste and continued to contribute articles to leading shelter publications until her death.

Around 1914, Goodnow founded a design company called the Modernist Studios. Unfortunately, the undertaking failed due to New York City homeowners not being enamored of interiors inspired by the cutting-edge Wiener Werkstätte. However, she had found her calling. She soon joined the decorating staff of the John Wanamaker store in New York City, where she ran Belmaison, a decorating division within the company, and worked with Nancy McClelland, who ran the Au Quatrième antiques department of the store. She established her own decorating firm in the 1920s. Among her clients were Alfred Vanderbilt, Rodman Wanamaker, and Brooke Astor. Her best-known employee was Billy Baldwin, whom she hired in the 1930s and who eventually became known as "the dean of American decorating". According to Baldwin, Wood's professional credo was: "The final judgement in decorating is not the logic of the mind, but the logic of the eye."

Ruby Ross Wood was seen as somewhat a new breed of female designer. She was not a wealthy socialite like Dorothy Draper or as glamorous as Rose Cumming. She was often said to be a chain-smoker, sharp tongued, impatient, and a "working" girl. Although she spent much of her life writing articles for design magazines, she was just as much of a designer as any of the others she is compared to.

In her own work Ruby Ross Wood ranged widely in terms of period, espousing 18th-century French furniture, Italian Directoire, English Regency, and English Georgian, as well the work of Jean-Michel Frank and other modern designers, though sparingly. "She was a designer that chose the comforts of the past rather than the relative austerity of modernism." (Interior Design and Decoration, 5th ed. by Sherrill Whiton and Stanley Abercrombie; Upper Saddle River, NJ. Pearson Education, Inc.: 2002. p. 575).

Ruby Ross Wood was also one of the first designers to use the Etruscan style furniture that was designed by a seldom heard, French designer Marc du Nicolas du Plantier. She also loved brown and white geometric Moroccan rugs, and one of, if not the first to import cotton print designs by Paule Marrot. Although her popularity in the design world seems small, she has had quite an impact in the New York City design scene.

Ruby Ross Wood died of lung cancer on 18 February 1950.

== See also ==
- The Great Lady Decorators: The Women Who Defined Interior Design, 1870-1955 by Adam Lewis (2010), Rizzoli, New York. ISBN 978-0-8478-3336-8
