= Alexa Hampton =

American interior designer

- Education: Brown University and New York University
- Occupations: Interior Designer and Author
- Spouse: Pavlos Papageorgiou (m. 2000)
- Relatives: Mark Hampton (father); Duane Hampton (mother)

Alexa Hampton is an American interior designer based in New York City, principal of the interior design firm Mark Hampton LLC. She also designs home furnishings through her company Alexa Hampton Inc., and acts as the creative director, strategic partner and brand ambassador for The Mine, formerly known as ATGStores.com

== Career ==
Alexa Hampton graduated from Brown University in 1993, after which she studied at New York University’s Institute of Fine Arts in Florence, Italy and in New York City. She worked with her father, the interior designer Mark Hampton, first as an apprentice and then as a senior designer. After her father’s death in 1998, she assumed ownership of his firm, Mark Hampton LLC.

In 2000, Hampton launched her first licensed product collection with a fabric line by Kravet. She also designs home furnishings for Hickory Chair, Visual Comfort, and Stark Carpet. In 2016, Hampton became the spokesperson, advisor and strategic partner for ATGStores.com

== Notable accomplishments ==
Hampton has received many accolades, including: inclusion from 2002 to the present on Architectural Digest’s list of the world’s top 100 interior designers and architects, and House Beautiful’s list of “America’s 100 Best Designers.” In 2002, Hampton was named one of New York’s “100 Best Architects and Designers” by New York Magazine. Interiors Magazine named Hampton one of eight female leaders in the design industry, and she was named one of twelve “Fun, Fearless Females” by Cosmopolitan Magazine. In 2005, Hampton was awarded the “American Spirit Award” by the American Folk Art Museum for her work as the interior designer of the Trowbridge House, the official guest house for past presidents of the United States in Washington, DC. She received an honorary doctorate in 2008 from Moore College of Art & Design and regularly lectures about design throughout the country.

== Television ==
Hampton has served as senior design consultant for PBS TV’s This Old House. She was the show’s first and only regularly appearing female cast member. She was also a co-host on Find!, a PBS series, and she worked on a special magazine edition of Find! and contributed to their website. She continues to make various television appearances.

== Publications ==
- Hampton, Alexa (2010). Alexa Hampton: The Language of Interior Design. New York: Clarkson Potter. ISBN 9780307460530.
- Hampton, Alexa (2013). Decorating in Detail. New York: Potter Style. ISBN 9780307956859.
