= Donghia =

American home furnishings company

Donghia, Inc.
- Company type: Private
- Industry: Luxury Home Furnishings
- Founded: 1968; 58 years ago
- Headquarters: New York, New York
- Products: Textiles, upholstery, wallcoverings, case pieces, lighting, accessories
- Owner: Kravet Inc.
- Website: www.kravet.com/donghia

Donghia is an American brand of decoration for furniture, textiles, lighting, and accessories. Italian-American interior designer Angelo Donghia founded Donghia in 1968. It is currently owned by Kravet Inc.

Donghia collections include textiles, furniture, wallcoverings, case pieces, accessories and upholstery. Manufactured in the United States, Donghia furniture consist of desks, buffets cabinets, étagères, side/end tables, cocktail tables, dining tables, sofas, chaises, chairs, and beds. Accessories range from lamps and chandeliers to vessels and mirrors, all handmade in Murano, Italy.

== History ==
In 1972, Angelo Donghia formed Donghia Associates which focused in the areas of residential, hospitality and contract interior design. Previously, Donghia had turned his attention to fabrics and wallcoverings and established & Vice Versa, a to-the-trade collection and showroom of fabrics and wallcoverings, which later became Donghia Textiles in 1980. After the first Donghia Showroom opened in Los Angeles, CA in 1976, its success led to the opening of Donghia Furniture which was established two years later. Producing upholstery and case pieces, Mr. Donghia continued with the growth of his companies, expanding his network of showrooms and products across the United States. Since his passing in 1985, Donghia was owned and operated as a private company. In the spring of 2005, the company was purchased by the Rubelli Group of Venice, Italy, a family business and designer and manufacturer of textiles.

On April 1, 2020, Donghia filed for Chapter 7 bankruptcy after the company announced that it was closing its showrooms.

On August 10, 2020, Kravet acquired the Donghia brand name, the company's intellectual and digital property, its designs, archives and inventory.

Donghia products have been sold to the trade in select Kravet showrooms throughout North America since the spring of 2021. Donghia will also be distributed throughout the Kravet Inc. network of overseas agent showrooms and distributors. With the Kravet ownership, Donghia will continue to maintain the essence of the brand's iconic designs and luxury aesthetic.
