= Archibald Brown (architect) =

American architect (c.1881–1956)

- Born: Archibald Manning Brown c. 1881; New York City, US
- Died: November 29, 1956 (aged 75); New York City, US
- Education: Harvard College
- Occupation: Architect
- Spouse: Eleanor Brown (m. 1934)
- Family: Lathrop Brown (brother)

Archibald Manning Brown (c. 1881 – November 29, 1956) was an American architect. His work was part of the architecture event in the art competition at the 1936 Summer Olympics.

== Biography ==
Brown was born c. 1881, in New York City. His brother was politician Lathrop Brown. He attended Groton School, graduating from Harvard College in 1903 with a Bachelor of Arts. He then graduated from École des Beaux-Arts in 1910. During World War I, he served in the United States Navy as an ensign.

Brown entered architecture in 1911, working for Peabody, Wilson & Brown (erroneously called Peabody, Wolfson & Brown by The New York Times). He worked for the firm until 1935, then worked for Brown, Lawford & Forbes from 1946 until his death. He primarily designed private homes, transitioning to public housing in his later career. For three terms, he was a member of the Municipal Art Commission of New York City. He also served as president of the Architectural League of New York. He was a member of the American Institute of Architects and the National Academy of Design, as well as a board member of the Parsons School of Fine and Applied Arts, the latter two being elected to in 1935 and 1942, respectively.

Brown was previously married to Helen Parrish, having five children together. In 1934, he married interior designer Eleanor Brown, with whom he had no children with. He was an amateur golfer, playing at thr National Golf Links of America and the Shinnecock Hills Golf Club. He died on November 29, 1956, aged 75, in his home in Manhattan, of illness.

== Works ==
Listed alphabetically. Sourced from Brown's New York Times obituary, unless otherwise noted.

- Brooklyn Children's Museum building
- Dartmouth College president's house
- Elliott-Chelsea Houses
- Harlem River Houses
