= Scott Salvator =

American interior designer

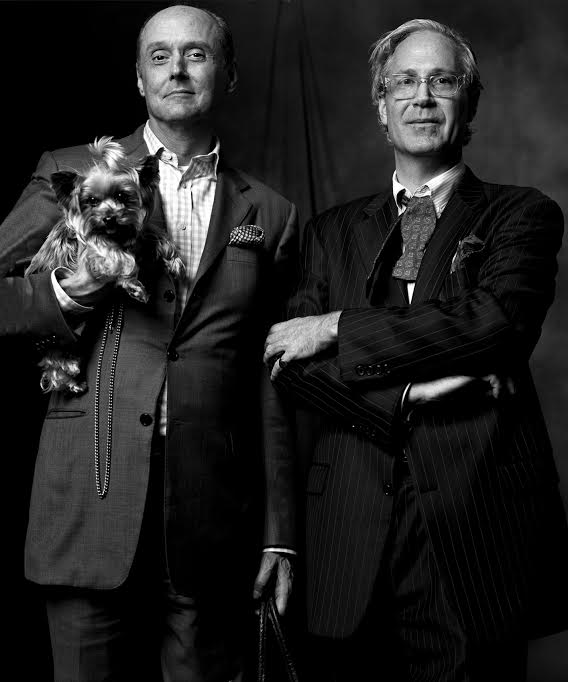
- Salvator, pictured with Michael Zabriskie
- Born: Rome, New York
- Website: www.scottsalvator.com

Scott Salvator is an American interior designer.

== Early life ==
Salvator was born in Rome, New York and raised in Lawrenceville, NJ. He began his education in building and design by joining his grandfather's businesses in construction and historic preservation in Princeton, N.J. He was responsible for the first total renovation of the Café Carlyle in New York's Carlyle Hotel, The Ardsley Building's art deco lobby, as well as the Ritz Tower. As a design associate to Mario Buatta, Salvator and Mark Hampton worked on the restoration of Blair House, the President's Guest House.

Salvator was named one of America's Top 100 Designers by House Beautiful magazine for eight consecutive years and was admitted to the New York Design Center Hall of Fame in 2004. He is a lecturer and panelist at New York's National Academy of Design. He has worked on numerous charity show houses, including several for New York City's Kips Bay Show House. and has been featured in Architectural Digest, House Beautiful and Elle Decor.

He began his education in building and design by joining his grandfather's businesses in construction and historic preservation in Princeton, N.J. He holds degrees in accounting and law, is a member of the Bar in three jurisdictions. He also attended the Fashion Institute of Technology and Parsons School of Design for interior design.
