= Betty Sherrill =

American interior designer (1923–2014)

- Born: Betty Lewis Stevens; April 18, 1923; New Orleans, Louisiana, US
- Died: May 12, 2014 (aged 91); Manhattan, New York City, US
- Occupation: Interior designer

Betty Lewis Sherrill (née Stevens; April 18, 1923 – May 12, 2014) was an American interior designer. She was the president of the firm McMillen's, succeeding Eleanor Brown.

== Biography ==
Sherrill was born on April 18, 1923, in New Orleans, to architect William Lewis Stevens and Sybil Wilkinson Stevens. She is a descendant of politician Fielding Lewis. She attended the McGehee School, then graduated from H. Sophie Newcomb Memorial College. She married Howard Virgil Sherrill (died 2010), an investment banker, and they moved to New York City in 1949.

After attending some classes at the Parsons School of Design, Sherrill founded the independent firm Elizabeth Sherrill Interiors, gaining her experience by designing the residences of her socialite friends, such as Laurence and Mary French Rockefeller, among others. In an interview, she expressed desires to have become an architect but chose not to, given a lack of women in architecture. Her firm later closed, and in 1952, she was hired to McMillen's. Stylistically, she was known for her furniture arrangements and pastel palettes. Her quiet luxury style is typical of McMillen's. After Eleanor Brown's retirement as president in 1976, Sherrill, her husband, and some investors, purchased the company, after which she became president. She retired as president in 2002 and remained chairwoman. Curbed described her as "one of the most influential American designers of the last half-century". She was an inducted into the Interior Design Hall of Fame in 1989, then received the Second Parsons Centurion Award for Design Excellence in 2006 and The Decorator's Club Inc. Medal of Honor in 2008.

From 1972 to 1999, Sherrill was president of One Sutton Place South. She died on May 12, 2014, aged 91, in Manhattan, from pancreatic cancer. Her daughter, Ann Pyne, succeeded her as president of McMillen's.
