= Kips Bay Show House =

Fundraising event in Manhattan

The Kips Bay Show House is an annual fundraising event run by the Kips Bay Boys & Girls Club in which celebrated interior designers are invited to redecorate a luxury Manhattan home.

== History ==
The Show House was first staged in 1973 to raise funds for after school and enrichment programs for New York City children. The program has grown in popularity over the years to the point that it presently draws over 20,000 guests each year. Since its inception, the Show House has raised over $17,000,000.

== Format ==
Each year, interior designers from around the country apply and are chosen to decorate a room within the Show House. A new house is chosen each year for the event. In 2010, the event was postponed because the house had been sold. Designers who have participated in past Show House makeovers include: Robert Brown, Mariette Gomez Hines, Beverly Ellsley, Mario Buatta, Alex Papachristidis, James Rixner, Jamie Drake, Juan Montoya, Larry Laslo, Christopher Peacock, Charles Pavarini III, Scott Salvator, Elaine Griffin, Bunny Williams, Nathan Egan, Keith Irvine, Groves & Co., Tom Britt, and David Barrett.

The annual Show House is considered a major social event in New York and receives significant press coverage, including The New York Times, House Beautiful, The Washington Post, and respected blogs such as Habitually Chic, Curbed. and "According to Mr. Brown.
