= Albert Hadley =

American interior designer (1920–2012)

- Hadley in 2005
- Born: Albert Livingston Hadley Jr. November 18, 1920; Springfield, Tennessee, U.S.
- Died: March 29, 2012 (aged 91); Nashville, Tennessee, U.S.
- Education: Peabody College; Parsons School of Design
- Occupations: Interior designer, decorator

Albert Livingston Hadley Jr. (November 18, 1920 – March 29, 2012) was an American interior designer and decorator.

== Biography ==
Hadley was born on November 18, 1920, in Springfield, Tennessee. He attended Peabody College in Nashville for two years, after which he worked as an assistant to one of the South's best-known decorators, A. Herbert Rodgers.

After serving overseas in World War II, Hadley moved to New York. Beginning in 1947, he studied at the Parsons School of Design, and after graduating in 1949, joined the school's faculty. He formed his own design studio, worked from 1956 until 1962 at the interior design firm McMillen's, and then cofounded Parish-Hadley, Associates with the interior decorator Sister Parish.

Hadley's clients included Al and Tipper Gore; Babe Paley and William S. Paley; Oscar de la Renta and Annette de la Renta; Jacqueline Kennedy Onassis; G. Patrick Maxwell; Mike Nichols and Diane Sawyer; Brooke Astor; and various members of the Astor and Getty families. Hadley worked in a variety of styles, including modern, Victorian, and Georgian. He was lauded with numerous international design awards for his creative output. He was inducted into the Interior Design Hall of Fame in 1986.
