= Suzanne Rheinstein =

American interior designer (1945 – 2023)

Suzanne Rheinstein (April 1, 1945 – March 20, 2023) was an American interior designer known for her classical designs with elements of Southern style.

== Early life and education ==
Rheinstein was born Suzanne Maria Stamps in New Orleans to Mimi (Patron) Stamps, a decorator and antiques store partner, and Joseph Stamps, a businessman in the exotic hardwoods and veneers industry.

Rheinstein earned a bachelor's degree in English literature from Tulane University in New Orleans, where she served as the managing editor of the school newspaper.

== Career ==
Rheinstein began her career in journalism, working for notable journalists such as Hodding Carter and Eric Sevareid of CBS News. In 1977, she married Frederic Rheinstein, a special effects and post-production company founder in Los Angeles.

During her career, Rheinstein authored three books. Her design projects included residential properties, such as a 1940s Georgian house in Northern California, a 1920s house in Bel Air, and her own weekend home in Montecito, California.

In 1988, Rheinstein founded Hollyhock, an antiques and decorative arts store in Hancock Park, Los Angeles. The store provided items like upholstered furniture, William Yeoward glasses, 18th-century prints, and her own textile designs produced by Lee Jofa.
