= International Contemporary Furniture Fair =

Annual interior design event in New York, US

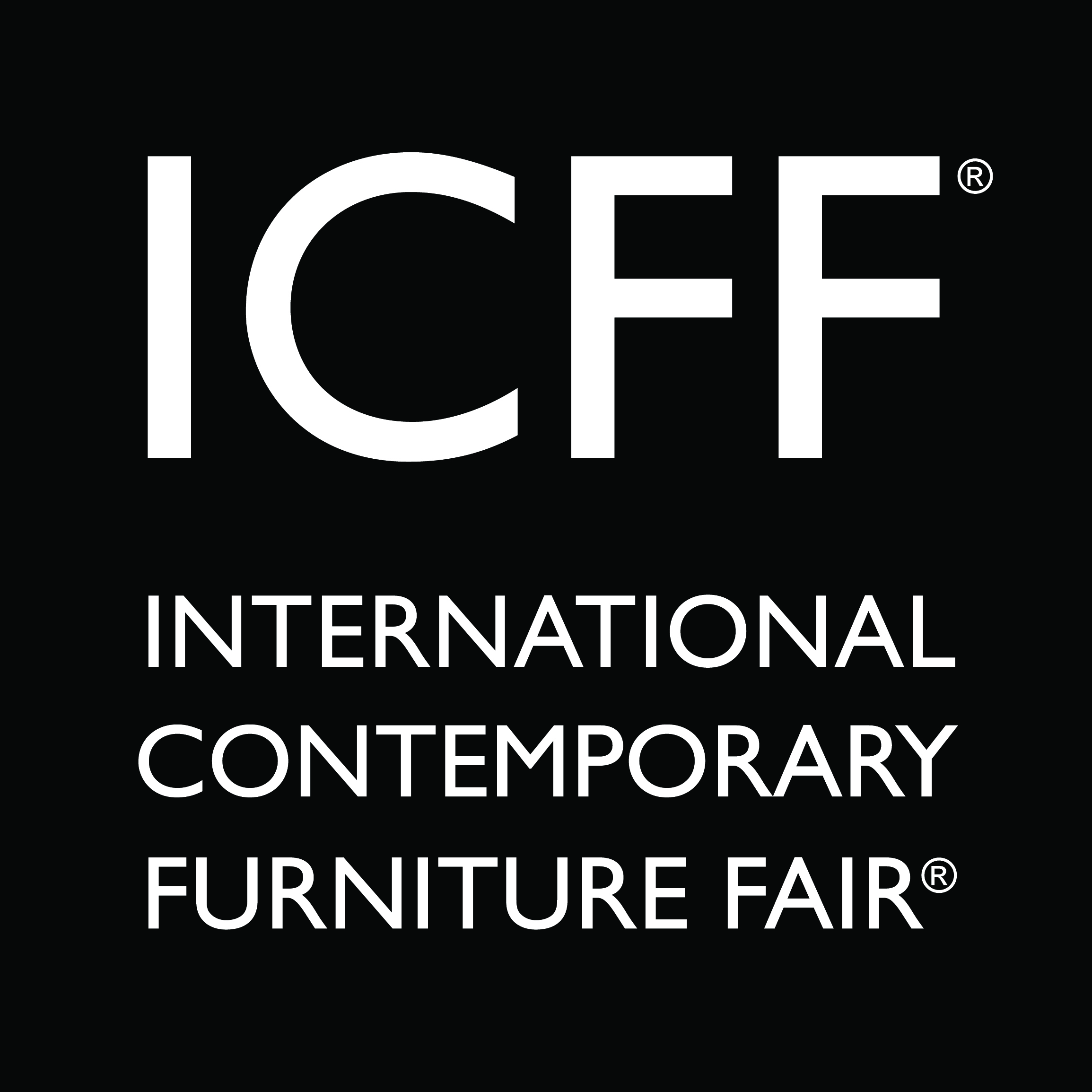

ICFF, the International Contemporary Furniture Fair, is an annual design show in New York City that showcases trending furniture and industrial design. Each year since its founding in 1989, the ICFF has hosted hundreds of international exhibitors, both established brands and emerging designers. Since 1993, it has also recognized selected exhibitors with ICFF Editors Awards. The ICFF is held at the Javits Center in New York each May.
