= Kravet =

New York City-based furniture company

Kravet Inc., is a home furnishings company established in 1918. This fifth generation family business distributes fabrics, furniture, wallcoverings, trimmings, carpets and accessories.

Kravet Inc. owns the brands of decoration Kravet, Lee Jofa, GP & J Baker, Brunschwig & Fils and Donghia. It has locations in North America and worldwide.

The Kravet Inc. design studio is based in NYC, with a warehouse in Anderson, South Carolina, and corporate offices on Long Island. The company has more than 40 showrooms in the U.S. and Canada and maintains offices and a distribution warehouse in Poole, United Kingdom.

== History ==
Shmuel Kravetsky, later Samuel Kravet, (1873-1947) emigrated from Grodno, Belarus, to the United States in 1903 with his wife and three sons. As a tailor, he began supplying tailored apparel to an upscale clientele in the New York metropolitan area. Recognizing in his clients a desire for interior design assistance as well, he began fashioning decorative trimmings such as tie-backs and tassels, which he would offer when he made house calls. With this subtle shift from the design of apparel to the design of interior design products, Samuel Kravet participated in the historical development of a then emerging interior design industry.

In 1918, Samuel Kravet opened a small trimmings store on Norfolk Street on the Lower East Side of Manhattan. In 1923, his four sons – Morris, Sam, Sol, and Hy – joined the business. They relocated to E. 21st St. and changed the company's name to S. Kravet & Sons. In 1924, they began offering decorative fabrics.

S. Kravet & Sons relocated to 38 E. 30th St. and began selling to the interior design trade exclusively. The business grew quickly. In 1952, the company relocated to 104 E. 25th St. where it would have new offices as well as a warehouse for the storage and preparation of product. In 1963, the company changed its name to Kravet Fabrics, Inc. and expanded once again, this time moving to a larger warehouse and office facility in Woodbury, Long Island, New York. The company began exporting in 1965 and establishing showrooms nationwide in 1970. Further expansions to Anderson, South Carolina and Canada followed.

The Kravet high-end licensing division began in 1993, to showcase designers and the design accents of famous locations, lifestyles and brands. The Mark Hampton Fabric and Trimmings collections were the first license to join the Kravet family. Its success has brought forth numerous other licensed collections. These include fabric, carpet and trimmings collections created by interior designers such as Alexa Hampton, Barclay Butera, Barbara Barry, Candice Olson, Michael Berman, Michael Weiss, Sarah Richardson, Vicente Wolf, David Phoenix, Andrew Martin, Kelly Wearstler, Nate Berkus, Sue Firestone, Jan Showers, Carrier and Company, Bunny Williams, Suzanne Rheinstein, Thomas O’Brien, Les Ensembliers, Barry Lantz, Malene B., Lilly Pulitzer and Windsor Smith, as well as collections inspired by fashion brands such as Oscar de la Renta, Diane von Furstenberg, kate spade new york, Echo Design, Ralph Lauren, Joseph Abboud, Calvin Klein Home, and Thom Filicia.

Kravet expanded its product offerings to include furniture in 1991, carpet in 2005, and lighting in 2007. It also acquired home furnishing manufacturer Lee Jofa in 1995 and fabric and upholstery maker GP & J Baker in 2001. To encompass this broader offering of products, in 2002, the company changed its name to Kravet Inc. In 2011, Kravet acquired prestigious fabric and upholstery maker Brunschwig & Fils in a bankruptcy auction for $9.655 million. Kravet Inc. has supplied textiles for many historic properties. Brunschwig & Fils subsequently provided the upholstery for the 2015 Obama chairs, used in the 2015 renovation of the State Dining Room at the White House in Washington, D.C. In 2015, Kravet expanded to include finished goods, launching the first-ever trade only e-commerce site, CuratedKravet.

In August 2020, Kravet Inc. acquired all assets from Donghia. Those assets include all of the intellectual property, designs, patents, copyrights, inventory, website, social media sites, artwork, archives and sampling.

== Bethpage Archive ==
In 2011, Kravet constructed an archive at their headquarters on Long Island with the acquisition of Brunschwig & Fils who collected a majority of the textiles in the collection. This massive collection of items including textile fragments, pieces of clothing and documents come from all over the world and all throughout history. Kravet Inc.’s diverse archive rivals many museums and features a variety or relics, such as eighteenth-century copperplate printed fabrics and lush floral nineteenth-century block printed furnishing fabrics. Other documents found in the archive include intricate toiles, ancient artisan-skilled woven textiles, hand-embroidered paisleys and an extensive collection of rare hand-block tiles. Kravet Inc. made parts of the archive available to the public through an exhibit featured at the New York School of Interior Design in the Fall of 2019. This extensive archival collection is continuously in acquisition mode.
