= Billy Baldwin (decorator) =

American interior designer (1903–1983)

- Born: William Baldwin Jr. May 30, 1903; Roland Park, Maryland, U.S.
- Died: November 25, 1983 (aged 80); Nantucket, Massachusetts, U.S.
- Occupation: Interior designer

William Baldwin Jr. (May 30, 1903 – November 25, 1983), known as Billy Baldwin and nicknamed Billy B, was an American interior designer, characterized in an obituary as the "dean of interior decorators". He was named to the International Best Dressed List Hall of Fame in 1974.

== Personal life ==
Baldwin was born on May 30, 1903, in Roland Park, Maryland and studied architecture at Princeton, dropping out after two years. He attended Truman Capote's Black and White Ball at the Plaza in 1966. Baldwin died of a heart ailment on November 25, 1983, at Nantucket Cottage Hospital on Nantucket Island, Massachusetts. He was openly gay.

== Career ==
Starting in 1935, Baldwin was employed by Ruby Ross Wood, and when she died in 1950, he took over the firm. In 1952, he formed his own firm, Baldwin and Martin, with Edward Martin. They decorated the White House of John F. Kennedy, and designed the houses and apartments of many well-known people, such as Cole Porter, Mary Wells Lawrence, Billy Rose, Rachel Lambert Mellon and Paul Mellon, Jacqueline Kennedy Onassis, Mike Nichols, Harvey Ladew, Babe Paley and William S. Paley, Pauline de Rothschild, Greta Garbo, Barbara Hutton, and Diana Vreeland. Baldwin's commercial clients included the Round Hill Club in Greenwich, CT, the Kenneth hair salon in New York City, and La Florentina in the South of France. In 1972, Baldwin designed a line of furniture (including his famous Slipper Chair), which continues to be manufactured by the Billy Baldwin Studio. He retired in 1973.

Baldwin wrote several books over his career, including Billy Baldwin Decorates (1972), Billy Baldwin Remembers (1974), and Billy Baldwin: An Autobiography (1985, posthumously). He was also featured in books by others, such as Legendary Decorators (1992), written by Mark Hampton, The New York Times Book of Interior Design and Decoration, and Scavullo on Men (1977) written by Scavullo. Adam Lewis published the biography Billy Baldwin: The Great American Decorator in 2010.

== Bibliography ==
- Billy Baldwin, Billy Baldwin Decorates, 1973.
- Adam Lewis, Billy Baldwin: The Great American Decorator, Rizzoli 2010, ISBN 0847833674.
- M.L. Aronson, "Billy Baldwin: A fresh approach to color and form reshapes the American aesthetic", Architectural Digest, January 2000 full text
