= Mary Jean Thompson =

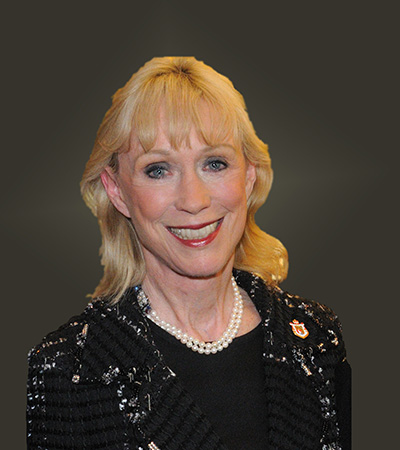

honorary consul of the Principality of Liechtenstein

Personal details
- Education: Lewis and Clark College; University of Utah
- Website: Principality of Liechtenstein Page

Mary Jean Thompson is an American honorary consul appointed by the ruling monarch and prime minister of the Principality of Liechtenstein and accredited by the Department of State of the United States of America. She serves the Pacific Northwest from the consulate in Portland, Oregon. She is the fifth consul representing Liechtenstein in the world and the only woman serving in that capacity.

== Biography ==
Thompson was born in Salem, Oregon, the daughter of L. Wayne and Bernis Nelson Schrunk. She attended North Salem High School and received the degrees of Bachelor of Music, cum laude from Lewis and Clark College and Bachelor of Fine Arts in Interior Design, summa cum laude, from the University of Utah.

Thompson founded Thompson Design Associates, Inc., in Reno, Nevada in 1970. Articles about Thompson and her work have been published by every leading national design magazine in the US including Architectural Digest, Interior Design, Contract Design and Interiors and internationally. She has been a professional member of the International Interior Design Association (IIDA) and the American Society of Interior Designers (ASID).

In 1991 Thompson founded the Healthcare Design Research Alliance, a consortium of the 10 or more of largest manufacturers of healthcare products and furnishings in the US. She led these manufacturers for 14 years in conducting research in US hospitals and producing better products integrated with one another.

Thompson has won numerous awards for Interior Design, including Best of Show, Honor Award, Merit Award and Citation Award in 2001 and two Citation Awards in 2003 by the Oregon Annual IIDA/AIA/ASID Interior Design competition.

Thompson is a lifetime Regent of the George Washington Foundation in Fredericksburg, Virginia and has served on the boards of the Oregon Symphony, Lewis and Clark College Alumni, Oregon Repertory Singers, and Reno Philharmonic Orchestra.

=== Diplomatic appointment ===
On March 24, 2010, Foreign Minister Aurelia Frick, accompanied by Liechtenstein's Ambassador to the United States, Claudia Fritsche, and Ambassador Roland Marxer, Director of the Liechtenstein Office for Foreign Affairs, installed Thompson as Honorary Consul of the Principality of Liechtenstein to Oregon and the Pacific Northwest Region of the United States of America and Head of Post.

Thompson will help Liechtenstein to widen its outreach to the Pacific Northwest and she will play a central role in increasing awareness of the Principality. She will promote academic and cultural exchanges as well as increase economic ties between the US and Liechtenstein.
