= Espinet =

Espinet is a surname. Notable people with the surname include:

- Ramabai Espinet (born 1948), Trinidad and Tobago writer, poet, and critic
- Sandra Espinet (born 1964), American interior designer and television personality
- Teresa Lostau i Espinet (1884–1923), Spanish painter and ceramist
