= Interior design =

Design of interior spaces to benefit their occupants

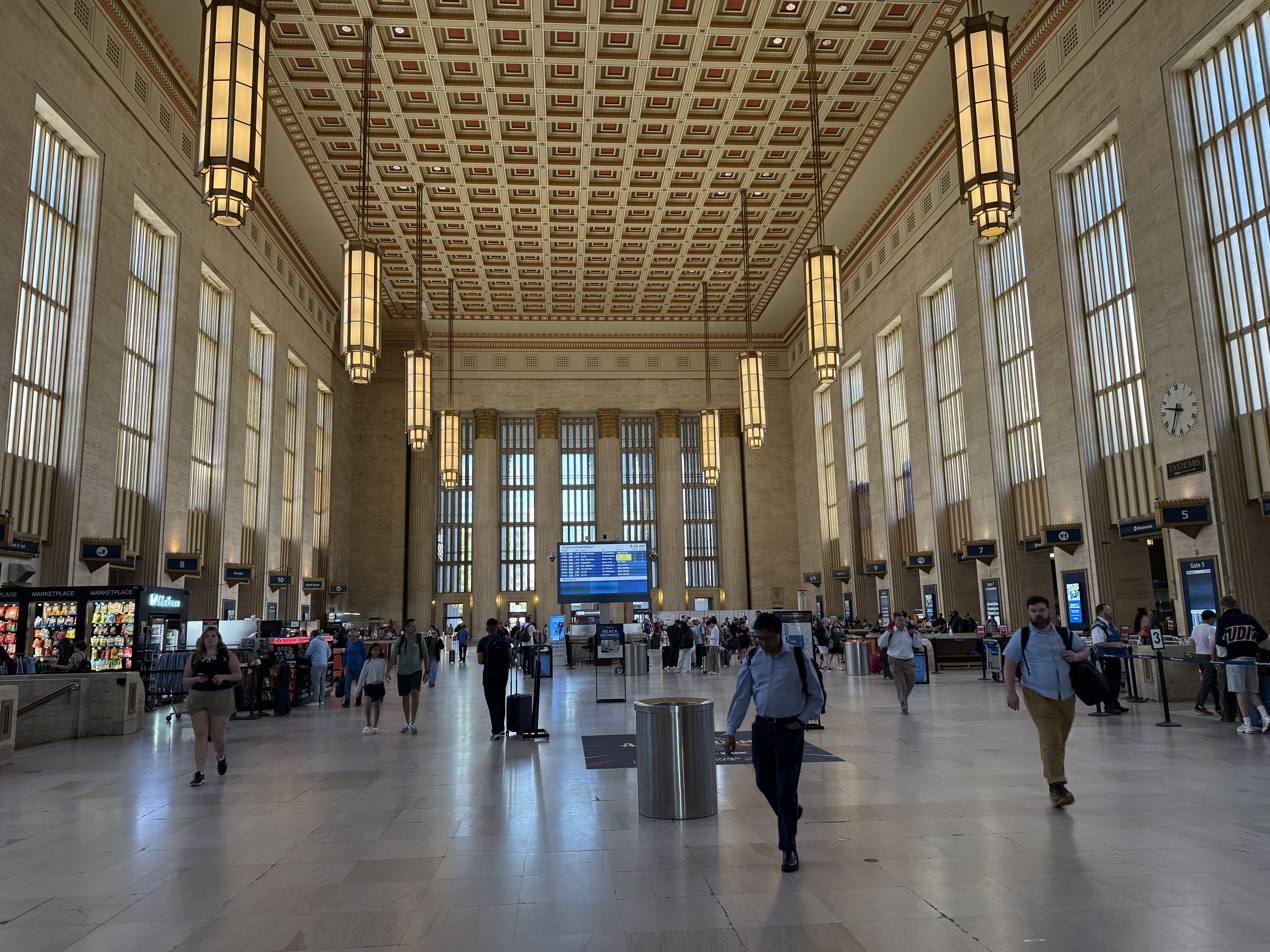
The art déco interior of the grand concourse at the 30th Street Station in Philadelphia

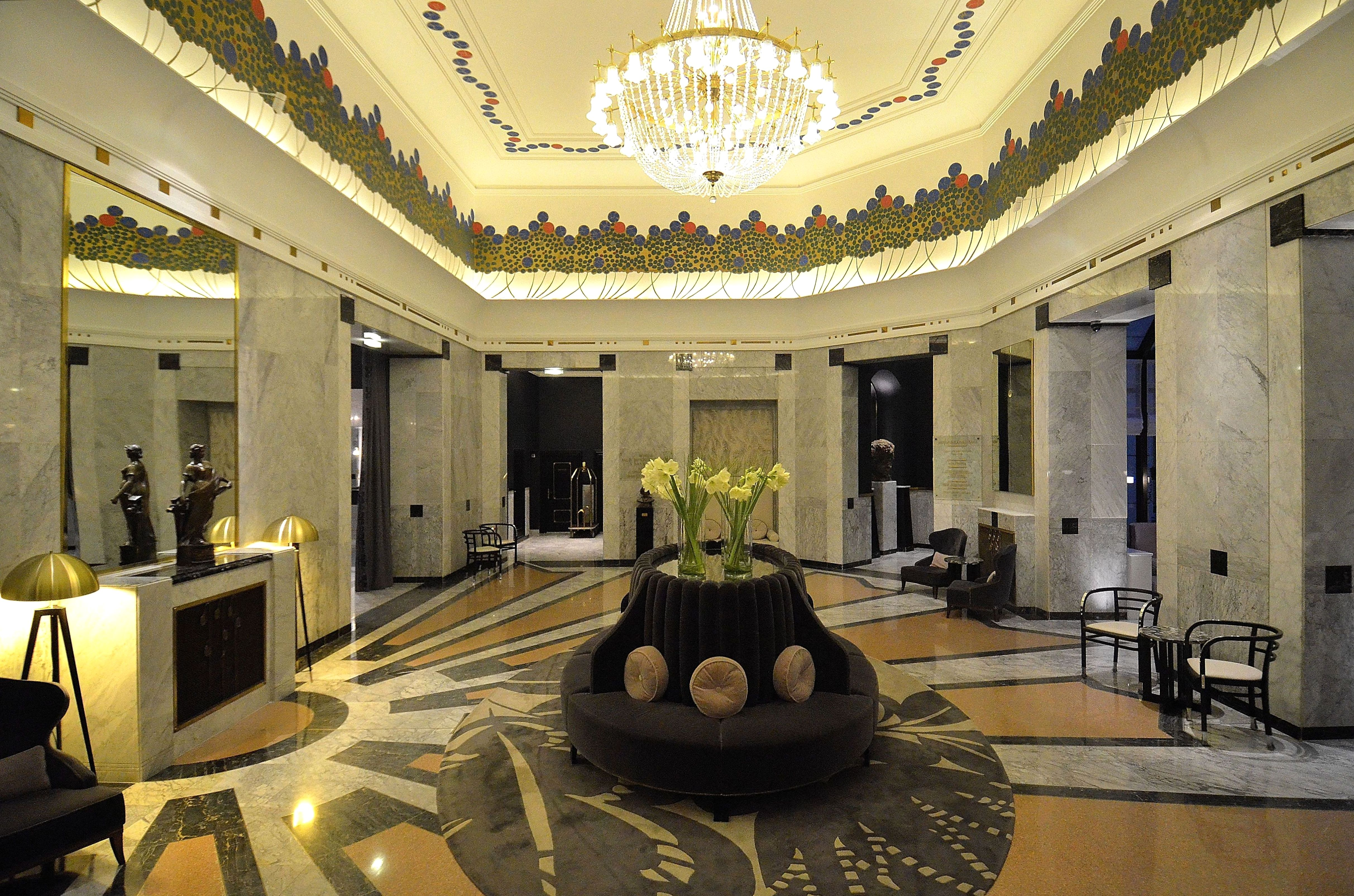
The lobby of Hotel Bristol, Warsaw

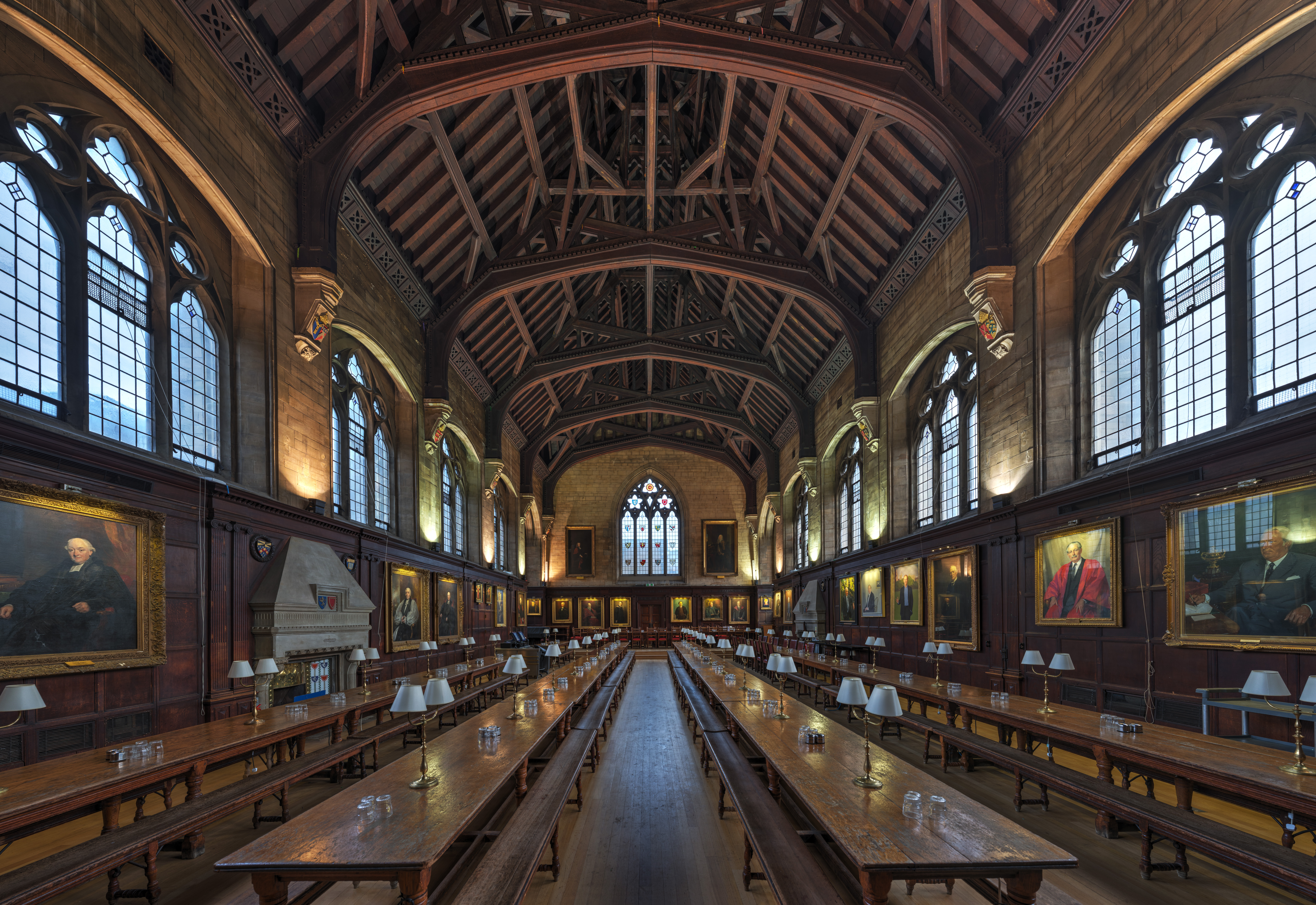
A historical example: Balliol College Dining Hall, Oxford

Interior design is the art and science of enhancing the interior of a building to achieve a healthier and more aesthetically pleasing environment for the people using the space. An interior designer is someone who plans, researches, coordinates, and manages such enhancement projects. Interior design is a multifaceted profession that includes conceptual development, space planning, site inspections, programming, research, communicating with the stakeholders of a project, construction management, and execution of the design. Interior designers make use of fundamental design principles from the visual arts used to help viewers understand a given scene.

== History and current terms ==
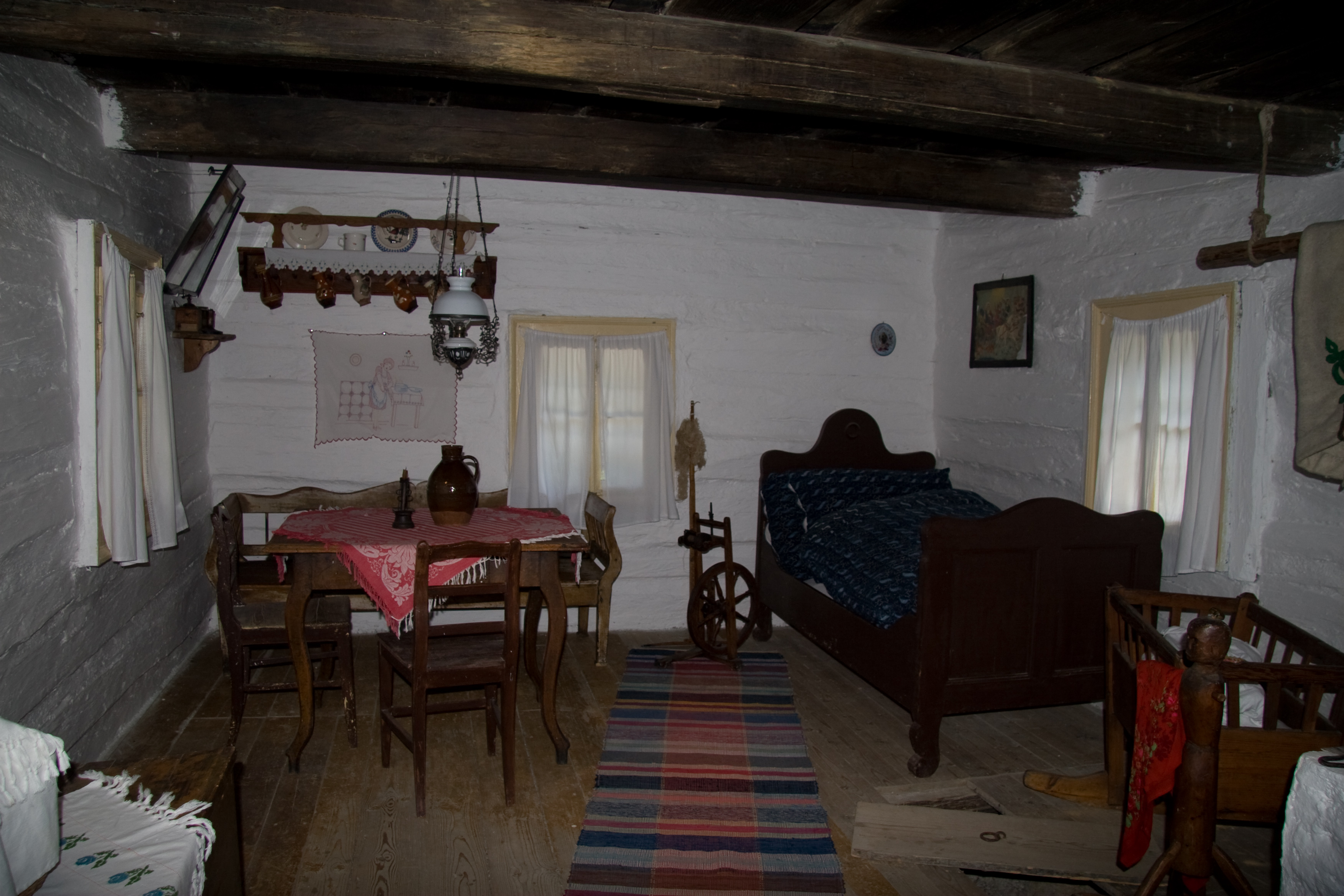
Typical interior of one of the houses in the Folk Architecture Reservation in Vlkolínec (Slovakia)

In the past, interiors were put together instinctively as a part of the process of building.

The profession of interior design has been a consequence of the development of society and the complex architecture that has resulted from the development of industrial processes.

The pursuit of effective use of space, user well-being and functional design has contributed to the development of the contemporary interior design profession. The profession of interior design is separate and distinct from the role of interior decorator, a term commonly used in the US; the term is less common in the UK, where the profession of interior design is still unregulated and therefore, strictly speaking, not yet officially a profession.

In ancient India, architects would also function as interior designers. This can be seen from the references of Vishwakarma the architect—one of the gods in Indian mythology. In these architects' design of 17th-century Indian homes, sculptures depicting ancient texts and events are seen inside the palaces, while during the medieval times wall art paintings were a common feature of palace-like mansions in India commonly known as havelis. While most traditional homes have been demolished to make way to modern buildings, there are still around 2000 havelis in the Shekhawati region of Rajasthan that display wall art paintings.

In ancient Egypt, "soul houses" (or models of houses) were placed in tombs as receptacles for food offerings. From these, it is possible to discern details about the interior design of different residences throughout the different Egyptian dynasties, such as changes in ventilation, porticoes, columns, loggias, windows, and doors.

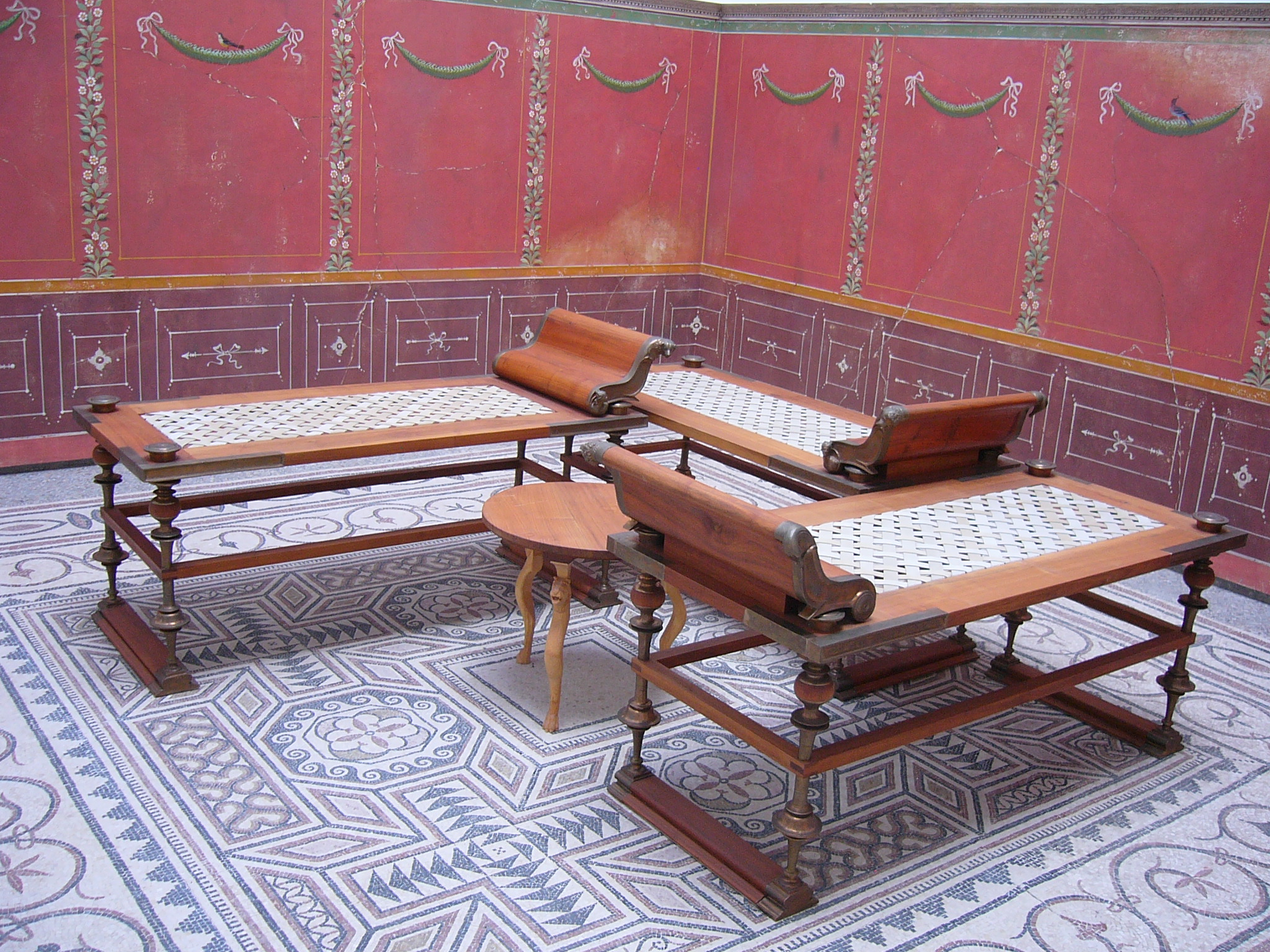
Reconstructed Roman triclinium or dining room, with three klinai or couches

Painting interior walls has existed for at least 5,000 years, with examples found as far north as the Ness of Brodgar, as have templated interiors, as seen in the associated Skara Brae settlement. It was the Greeks, and later Romans who added co-ordinated, decorative mosaics floors, and templated bath houses, shops, civil offices, Castra (forts) and temple, interiors, in the first millennia BC. With specialised guilds dedicated to producing interior decoration, and formulaic furniture, in buildings constructed to forms defined by Roman architects, such as Vitruvius: De architectura, libri decem (The Ten Books on Architecture).

Throughout the 17th and 18th century and into the early 19th century, interior decoration was the concern of the homemaker, or an employed upholsterer or craftsman who would advise on the artistic style for an interior space. Architects would also employ craftsmen or artisans to complete interior design for their buildings.

=== Commercial interior design and management ===
In the mid-to-late 19th century, interior design services expanded greatly, as the middle class in industrial countries grew in size and prosperity and began to desire the domestic trappings of wealth to cement their new status. Large furniture firms began to branch out into general interior design and management, offering full house furnishings in a variety of styles. This business model flourished from the mid-century to 1914, when this role was increasingly usurped by independent, often amateur, designers. This paved the way for the emergence of the professional interior design in the mid-20th century.

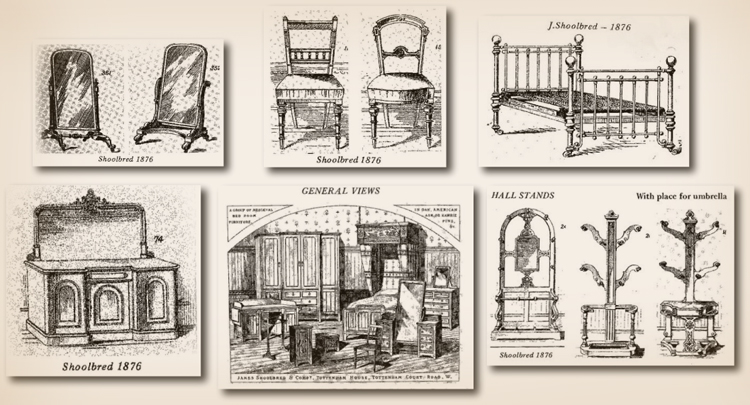
Illustrated catalog of the James Shoolbred Company, published in 1876

In the 1950s and 1960s, upholsterers began to expand their business remits. They framed their business more broadly and in artistic terms and began to advertise their furnishings to the public. To meet the growing demand for contract interior work on projects such as offices, hotels, and public buildings, these businesses became much larger and more complex, employing builders, joiners, plasterers, textile designers, artists, and furniture designers, as well as engineers and technicians to fulfil the job. Firms began to publish and circulate catalogs with prints for different lavish styles to attract the attention of expanding middle classes.

As department stores increased in number and size, retail spaces within shops were furnished in different styles as examples for customers. One particularly effective advertising tool was to set up model rooms at national and international exhibitions in showrooms for the public to see. Some of the pioneering firms in this regard were Waring & Gillow, James Shoolbred, Mintons, and Holland & Sons. These traditional high-quality furniture making firms began to play an important role as advisers to unsure middle class customers on taste and style, and began taking out contracts to design and furnish the interiors of many important buildings in Britain.

This type of firm emerged in America after the Civil War. The Herter Brothers, founded by two German émigré brothers, began as an upholstery warehouse and became one of the first firms of furniture makers and interior decorators. With their own design office and cabinet-making and upholstery workshops, Herter Brothers were prepared to accomplish every aspect of interior furnishing including decorative paneling and mantels, wall and ceiling decoration, patterned floors, and carpets and draperies.

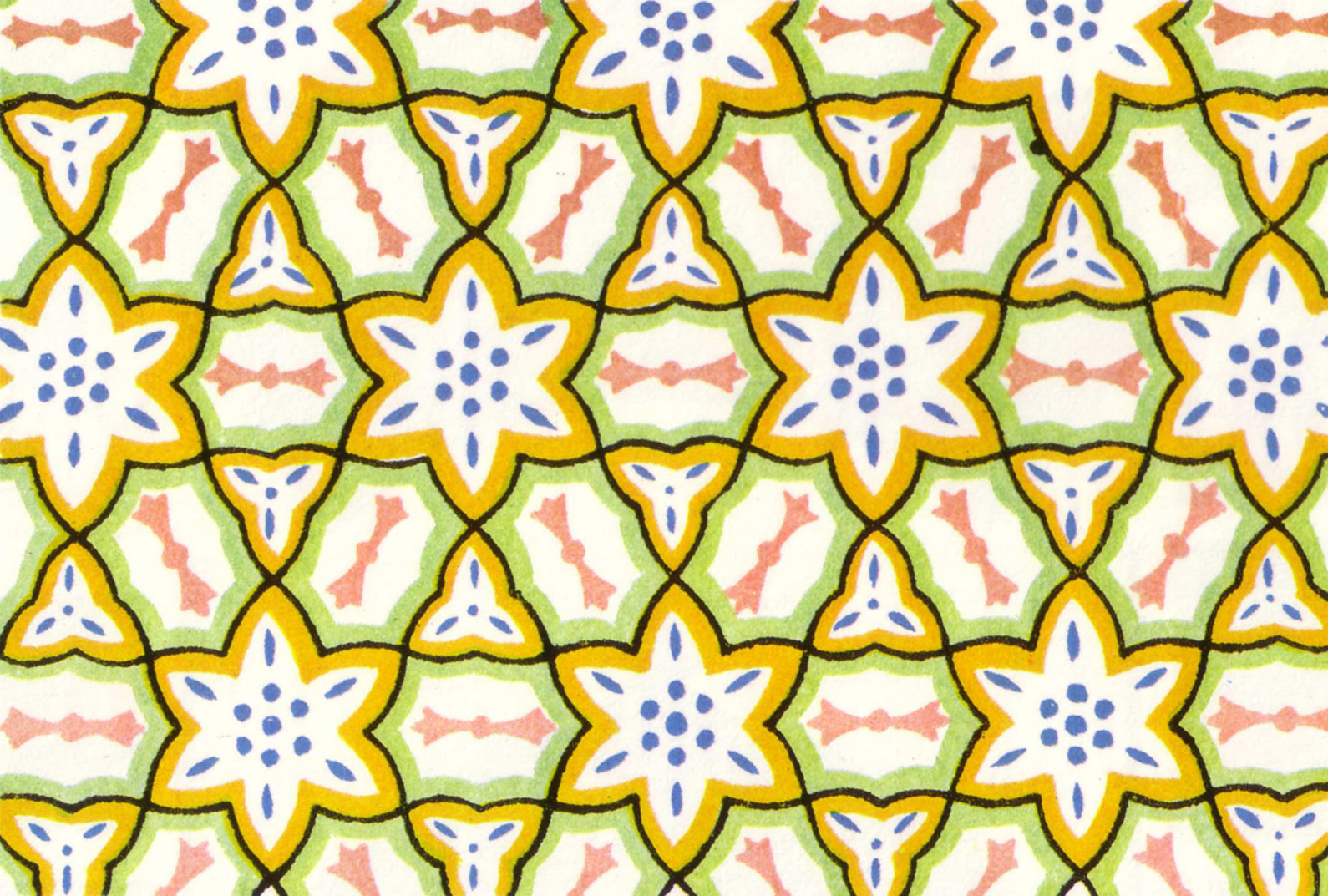
Illustration from The Grammar of Ornament (1856), by interior designer Owen Jones

A pivotal figure in popularizing theories of interior design to the middle class was the architect Owen Jones, one of the most influential design theorists of the nineteenth century. Jones' first project was his most important—in 1851, he was responsible for not only the decoration of Joseph Paxton's gigantic Crystal Palace for the Great Exhibition but also the arrangement of the exhibits within. He chose a controversial palette of red, yellow, and blue for the interior ironwork and, despite initial negative publicity in the newspapers, was eventually unveiled by Queen Victoria to much critical acclaim. His most significant publication was The Grammar of Ornament (1856), in which Jones formulated 37 key principles of interior design and decoration.

Jones was employed by some of the leading interior design firms of the day; in the 1860s, he worked in collaboration with the London firm Jackson & Graham to produce furniture and other fittings for high-profile clients including art collector Alfred Morrison as well as Ismail Pasha, Khedive of Egypt.

In 1882, the London Directory of the Post Office listed 80 interior decorators. Some of the most distinguished companies of the period were Crace, Waring & Gillowm and Holland & Sons; famous decorators employed by these firms included Thomas Edward Collcutt, Edward William Godwin, Charles Barry, Gottfried Semper, and George Edmund Street.

=== Transition to professional interior design ===
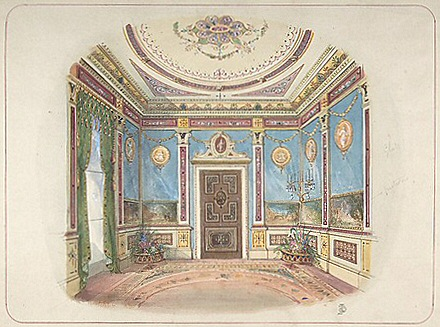
This interior was designed by John Dibblee Crace, President of the Institute of British Decorators, established in 1899.

By the turn of the 20th century, amateur advisors and publications were increasingly challenging the monopoly that the large retail companies had on interior design. English feminist author Mary Haweis wrote a series of widely read essays in the 1880s in which she derided the eagerness with which aspiring middle-class people furnished their houses according to the rigid models offered to them by the retailers. She advocated the individual adoption of a particular style, tailor-made to the individual needs and preferences of the customer:

One of my strongest convictions, and one of the first canons of good taste, is that our houses, like the fish's shell and the bird's nest, ought to represent our individual taste and habits.

The move toward decoration as a separate artistic profession, unrelated to the manufacturers and retailers, received an impetus with the 1899 formation of the Institute of British Decorators; with John Dibblee Crace as its president, it represented almost 200 decorators around the country. By 1915, the London Directory listed 127 individuals trading as interior decorators, of which 10 were women. Rhoda Garrett and Agnes Garrett were the first women to train professionally as home decorators in 1874. The importance of their work on design was regarded at the time as on a par with that of William Morris. In 1876, their work – Suggestions for House Decoration in Painting, Woodwork and Furniture – spread their ideas on artistic interior design to a wide middle-class audience.

By 1900, the situation was described by The Illustrated Carpenter and Builder:

Until recently when a man wanted to furnish he would visit all the dealers and select piece by piece of furniture ....Today he sends for a dealer in art furnishings and fittings who surveys all the rooms in the house and he brings his artistic mind to bear on the subject.

In America, Candace Wheeler was one of the first woman interior designers and helped encourage a new style of American design. She was instrumental in the development of art courses for women in a number of major American cities and was considered a national authority on home design. An important influence on the new profession was The Decoration of Houses, a manual of interior design written by Edith Wharton with architect Ogden Codman in 1897 in America. In the book, the authors denounced Victorian-style interior decoration and interior design, especially those rooms that were decorated with heavy window curtains, Victorian bric-a-brac, and overstuffed furniture. They argued that such rooms emphasized upholstery at the expense of proper space planning and architectural design and were, therefore, uncomfortable and rarely used. The book is considered a seminal work, and its success led to the emergence of professional decorators working in the manner advocated by its authors, most notably Elsie de Wolfe.

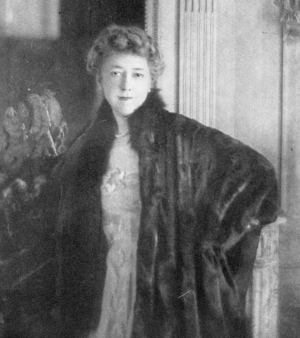
Elsie de Wolfe, taken from The House in Good Taste, 1913

Elsie De Wolfe was one of the first interior designers. Rejecting the Victorian style she grew up with, she chose a more vibrant scheme, along with more comfortable furniture in the home. Her designs were light, with fresh colors and delicate Chinoiserie furnishings, as opposed to the Victorian preference of heavy, red drapes and upholstery, dark wood and intensely patterned wallpapers. Her designs were also more practical; she eliminated the clutter that occupied the Victorian home, enabling people to entertain more guests comfortably. In 1905, de Wolfe was commissioned for the interior design of the Colony Club on Madison Avenue; its interiors garnered her recognition almost over night. She compiled her ideas into her widely read 1913 book, The House in Good Taste.

In England, Syrie Maugham became a legendary interior designer credited with designing the first all-white room. Starting her career in the early 1910s, her international reputation soon grew; she later expanded her business to New York City and Chicago. Born during the Victorian Era, a time characterized by dark colors and small spaces, she instead designed rooms filled with light and furnished in multiple shades of white and mirrored screens. In addition to mirrored screens, her trademark pieces included: books covered in white vellum, cutlery with white porcelain handles, console tables with plaster palm-frond, shell, or dolphin bases, upholstered and fringed sleigh beds, fur carpets, dining chairs covered in white leather, and lamps of graduated glass balls, and wreaths.

=== Expansion ===
The interior design profession became more established after World War II. From the 1950s onwards, spending on the home increased. Interior design courses were established, requiring the publication of textbooks and reference sources. Historical accounts of interior designers and firms distinct from the decorative arts specialists were made available. Organisations to regulate education, qualifications, standards and practices, etc. were established for the profession.

Interior design was previously seen as playing a secondary role to architecture. It also has many connections to other design disciplines, involving the work of architects, industrial designers, engineers, builders, craftsmen, etc. For these reasons, the government of interior design standards and qualifications was often incorporated into other professional organisations that involved design. Organisations such as the Chartered Society of Designers, established in the UK in 1986, and the American Designers Institute, founded in 1938, governed various areas of design.

It was not until later that specific representation for the interior design profession was developed. The US National Society of Interior Designers was established in 1957, while in the UK the Interior Decorators and Designers Association was established in 1966. Across Europe, other organisations such as The Finnish Association of Interior Architects (1949) were being established and in 1994 the International Interior Design Association was founded.

Ellen Mazur Thomson, author of Origins of Graphic Design in America (1997), determined that professional status is achieved through education, self-imposed standards and professional gate-keeping organizations. Having achieved this, interior design became an accepted profession.

== Interior decorators and interior designers ==
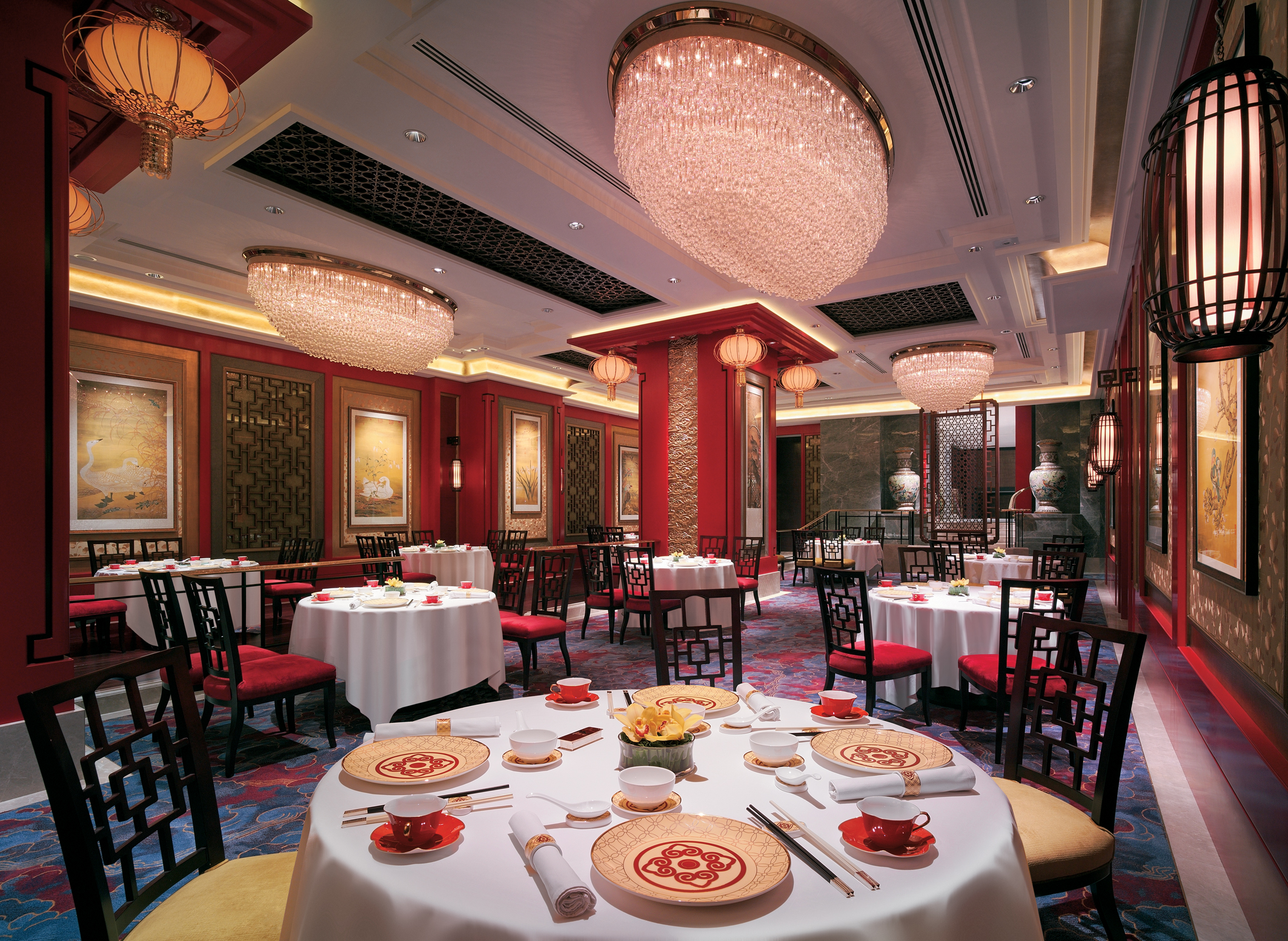
Interior design in a restaurant

Interior design is the art and science of understanding people's behavior to create functional spaces, that are aesthetically pleasing, within a building. Decoration is the furnishing or adorning of a space with decorative elements, sometimes complemented by advice and practical assistance. In short, interior designers may decorate, but decorators do not design.

=== Interior designer ===
Interior designer implies that there is more of an emphasis on planning, functional design and the effective use of space, as compared to interior decorating. An interior designer in fine line design can undertake projects that include arranging the basic layout of spaces within a building as well as projects that require an understanding of technical issues such as window and door positioning, acoustics, and lighting. Although an interior designer may create the layout of a space, they may not alter load-bearing walls without having their designs stamped for approval by a structural engineer. Interior designers often work directly with architects, engineers and contractors.

Interior designers must be highly skilled in order to create interior environments that are functional, safe, and adhere to building codes, regulations and ADA requirements. They go beyond the selection of color palettes and furnishings and apply their knowledge to the development of construction documents, occupancy loads, healthcare regulations and sustainable design principles, as well as the management and coordination of professional services including mechanical, electrical, plumbing, and life safety—all to ensure that people can live, learn or work in an innocuous environment that is also aesthetically pleasing.

Someone may wish to specialize and develop technical knowledge specific to one area or type of interior design, such as residential design, commercial design, hospitality design, healthcare design, universal design, exhibition design, furniture design, and spatial branding. Interior design is a creative profession that is relatively new, constantly evolving, and often confusing to the public. It is not always an artistic pursuit and can rely on research from many fields to provide a well-trained understanding of how people are often influenced by their environments.

=== Color in interior design ===
Color is a powerful design tool in decoration, as well as in interior design, which is the art of composing and coordinating colors together to create a stylish scheme on the interior architecture of the space.

It can be important to interior designers to acquire a deep experience with colors, understand their psychological effects, and understand the meaning of each color in different locations and situations in order to create suitable combinations for each place. Color can affect the way that humans think, feel, or look at space. Color can have a major effect on human behavior through all ages. An interior designer must understand that different colors can easily overstimulate people depending on the environment. Color can also have effects on a room. For example, if someone is claustrophobic then painting a room in darker colors could make the room feel smaller therefore the person could feel trapped.

Combining colors together could result in creating a state of mind as seen by the observer, and could eventually result in positive or negative effects on them. Colors can make the room feel either more calm, cheerful, comfortable, stressful, or dramatic. Color combinations can make a tiny room seem larger or smaller. So it is for the Interior designer to choose appropriate colors for a place towards achieving how clients would want to look at, and feel in, that space.

In 2024, red-colored home accessories were popularized on social media and in several design magazines for claiming to enhance interior design. This was coined the Unexpected Red Theory.

== Lighting ==
Lighting in a room can affect the way that a room is shown. By adding natural and artificial lighting a designer can enhance the features in space and make it more pleasing. When an interior designer places lighting in a home it is important to know what lighting to put where and how to use lighting to highlight important places in the room. Lighting can enhance the aesthetic appeal of a place, setting the mood for the room. For example, when putting lighting into an office you want to make sure there is overhead lighting, task/ desk lighting and natural lighting. Making sure there is enough lighting in a workspace is important so the person using the place does not strain their eyesight.

== Specialties ==
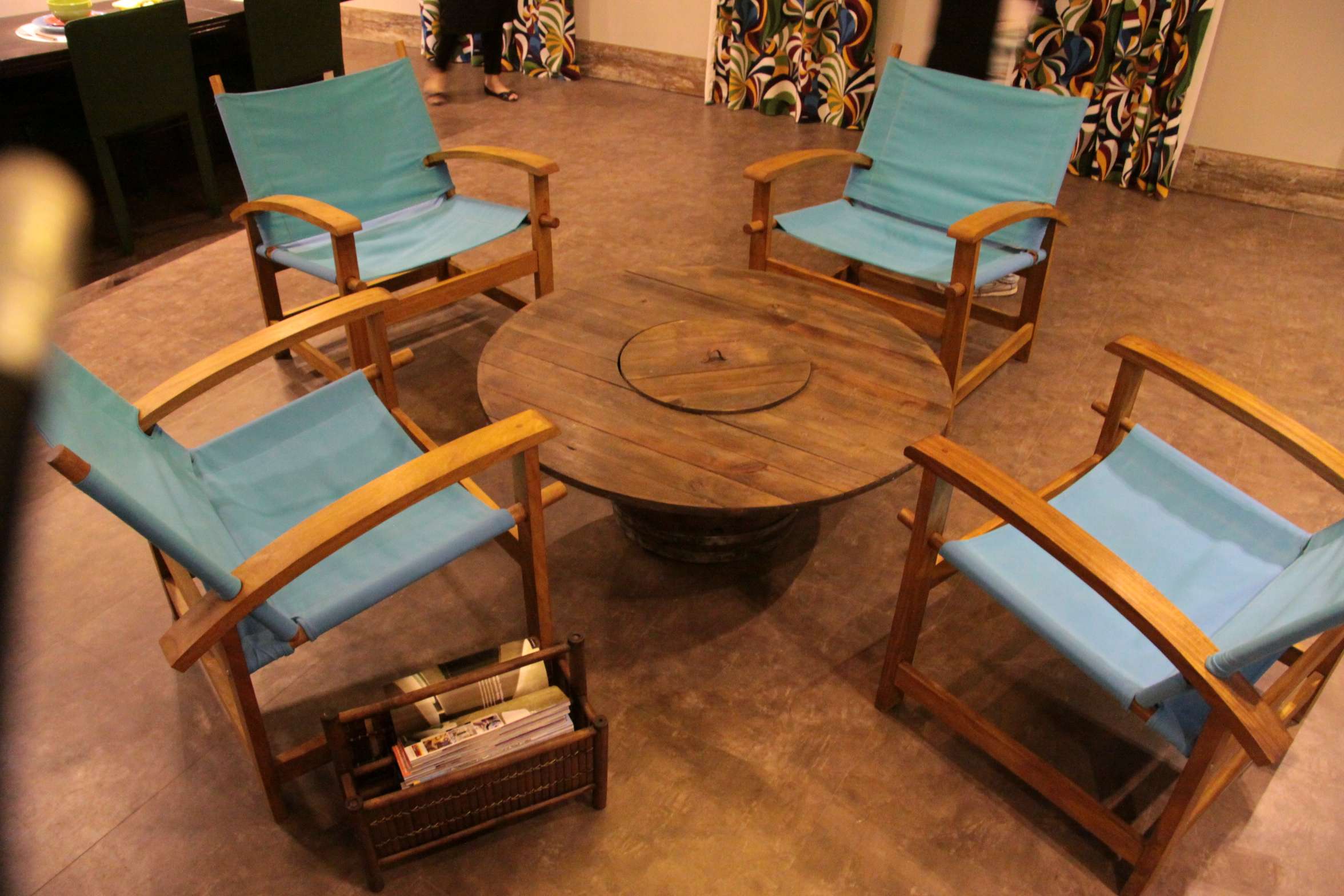
An electric wire reel reused as a center table at a Rio de Janeiro decoration fair

=== Residential ===
Residential design is the design of the interior of private residences. As this type of design is specific for individual situations, the needs and wants of the individual are paramount in this area of interior design. The interior designer may work on the project from the initial planning stage or may work on the remodeling of an existing structure. It is often a process that takes months to fine-tune and create a space with the vision of the client.

=== Commercial ===
Commercial design encompasses a wide range of subspecialties.

- Retail: includes malls and shopping centers, department stores, specialty stores, visual merchandising, and showrooms.
- Visual and spatial branding: The use of space as a medium to express a corporate brand.
- Corporate: office design for any kind of business such as banks.
- Healthcare: the design of hospitals, assisted living facilities, medical offices, dentist offices, psychiatric facilities, laboratories, medical specialist facilities.
- Hospitality and recreation: includes hotels, motels, resorts, cruise ships, cafes, bars, casinos, nightclubs, theaters, music and concert halls, opera houses, sports venues, restaurants, gyms, health clubs and spas, etc.
- Institutional: government offices, financial institutions (banks and credit unions), schools and universities, religious facilities, etc.
- Industrial facilities: manufacturing and training facilities as well as import and export facilities.
- Exhibition: includes museums, gallery, exhibition hall, specially the design for showroom and exhibition gallery.
- Traffic building: includes bus station, subway station, airports, pier, etc.
- Sports: includes gyms, stadiums, swimming rooms, basketball halls, etc.
- Teaching in a private institute that offer classes of interior design.
- Self-employment.
- Employment in private sector firms.

=== Other ===
Other areas of specialization include amusement and theme park design, museum and exhibition design, exhibit design, event design (including ceremonies, weddings, baby and bridal showers, parties, conventions, and concerts), interior and prop styling, craft styling, food styling, product styling, tablescape design, theatre and performance design, stage and set design, scenic design, and production design for film and television. Beyond those, interior designers, particularly those with graduate education, can specialize in healthcare design, gerontological design, educational facility design, and other areas that require specialized knowledge. Some university programs offer graduate studies in theses and other areas. For example, both Cornell University and the University of Florida offer interior design graduate programs in environment and behavior studies.

== Profession ==
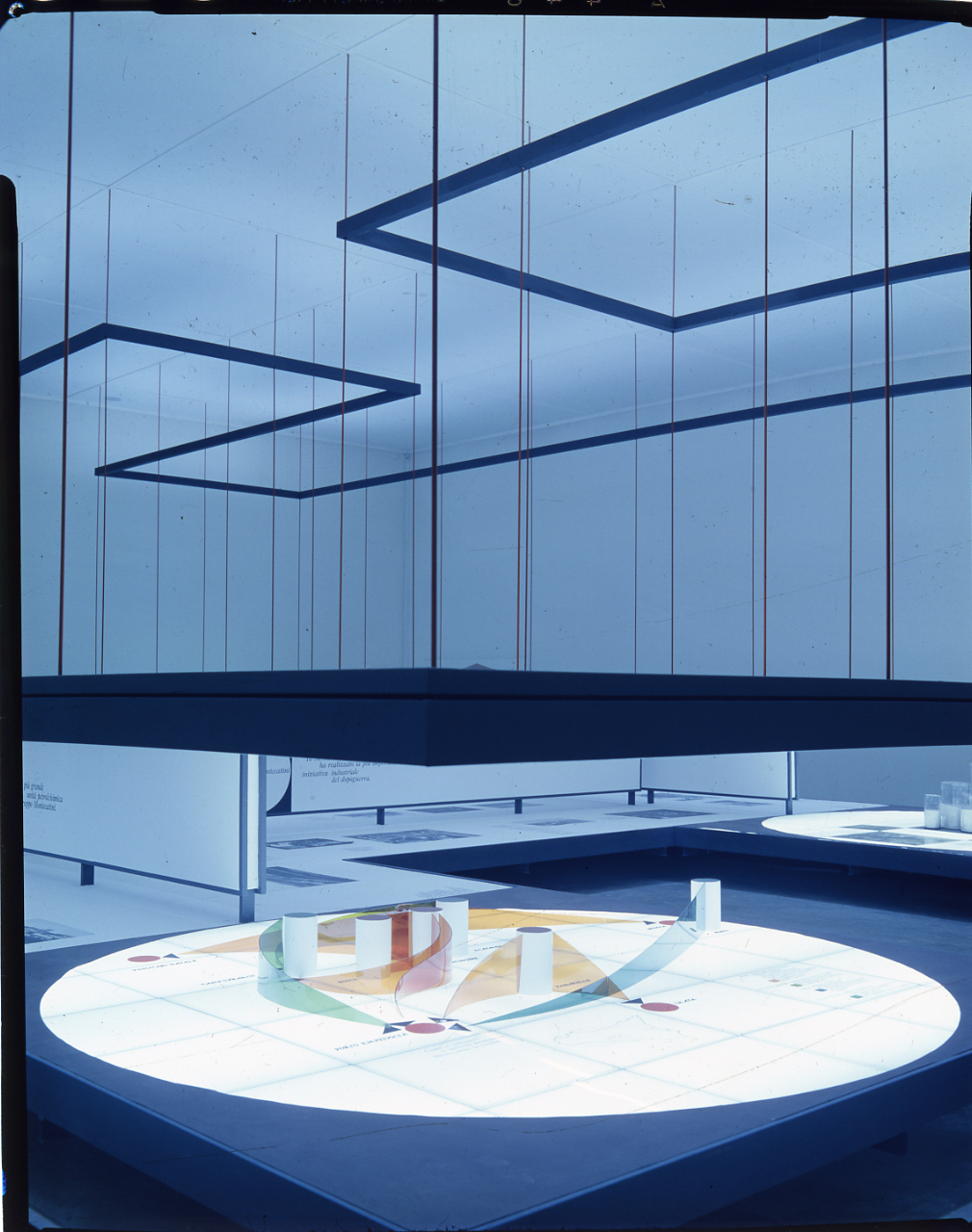
Installment by L. Gargantini for the Bolzano fair, 1957. Photo by Paolo Monti (Fondo Paolo Monti, BEIC).

=== Education ===
There are various paths that one can take to become a professional interior designer. All of these paths involve some form of training. Working with a successful professional designer is an informal method of training and has previously been the most common method of education. In many states, however, this path alone cannot lead to licensing as a professional interior designer. Training through an institution such as a college, art or design school or university is a more formal route to professional practice.

In many countries, several university degree courses are now available, including those on interior architecture, taking three or four years to complete.

A formal education program, particularly one accredited by or developed with a professional organization of interior designers, can provide training that meets a minimum standard of excellence and therefore gives a student an education of a high standard. There are also university graduate and Ph.D. programs available for those seeking further training in a specific design specialization (i.e. gerontological or healthcare design) or those wishing to teach interior design at the university level.

=== Working conditions ===
There are a wide range of working conditions and employment opportunities within interior design. Large and tiny corporations often hire interior designers as employees on regular working hours. Designers for smaller firms and online renovation platforms usually work on a contract or per-job basis. Self-employed designers, who made up 32% of interior designers in 2020, usually work the most hours. Interior designers often work under stress to meet deadlines, stay on budget, and meet clients' needs and wishes.

In some cases, licensed professionals review the work and sign it before submitting the design for approval by clients or construction permitting. The need for licensed review and signature varies by locality, relevant legislation, and scope of work. Their work can involve significant travel to visit different locations. However, with technology development, the process of contacting clients and communicating design alternatives has become easier and requires less travel.

== Styles ==
=== Art Deco ===
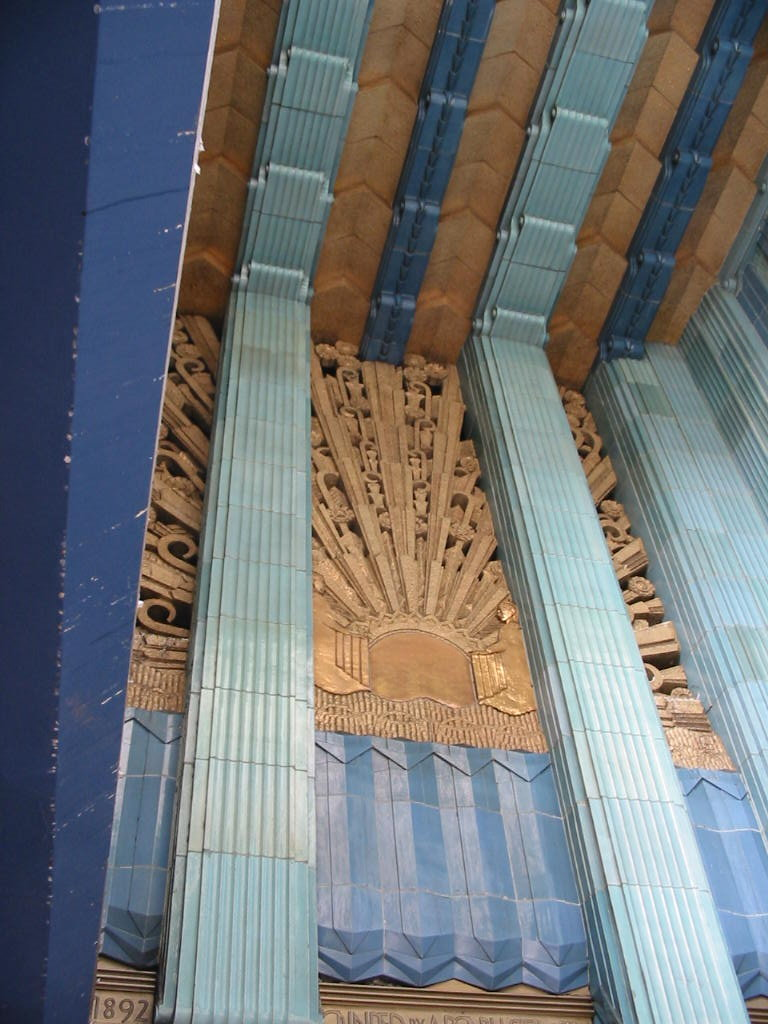
Terracotta Art Deco sunburst design above front doors of the Eastern Columbia Building in Los Angeles; built 1930

The Art Deco style began in Europe in the early years of the 20th century, with the waning of Art Nouveau. The term "Art Deco" was taken from the Exposition Internationale des Arts Decoratifs et Industriels Modernes, a world's fair held in Paris in 1925. Art Deco rejected many traditional classical influences in favour of more streamlined geometric forms and metallic color. The Art Deco style influenced all areas of design, especially interior design, because it was the first style of interior decoration to spotlight new technologies and materials.

Art Deco style is mainly based on geometric shapes, streamlining, and clean lines. The style offered a sharp, cool look of mechanized living utterly at odds with anything that came before.

Art Deco rejected traditional materials of decoration and interior design, opting instead to use more unusual materials such as chrome, glass, stainless steel, shiny fabrics, mirrors, aluminium, lacquer, inlaid wood, sharkskin, and zebra skin. The use of harder, metallic materials was chosen to celebrate the machine age. These materials reflected the dawning modern age that was ushered in after the end of the First World War. The innovative combinations of these materials created contrasts that were very popular at the time – for example the mixing together of highly polished wood and black lacquer with satin and furs. The barber shop in the Austin Reed store in London was designed by P. J. Westwood. It was soon regarded as the trendiest barber shop in Britain due to its use of metallic materials.

The color themes of Art Deco consisted of metallic color, neutral color, bright color, and black and white. In interior design, cool metallic colors including silver, gold, metallic blue, charcoal grey, and platinum tended to predominate. Serge Chermayeff, a Russian-born British designer made extensive use of cool metallic colors and luxurious surfaces in his room schemes. His 1930 showroom design for a British dressmaking firm had a silver-grey background and black mirrored-glass wall panels.

Black and white was also a very popular color scheme during the 1920s and 1930s. Black and white checkerboard tiles, floors and wallpapers were very trendy at the time. As the style developed, bright vibrant colors became popular as well.

Art Deco furnishings and lighting fixtures had a glossy, luxurious appearance with the use of inlaid wood and reflective finishes. The furniture pieces often had curved edges, geometric shapes, and clean lines. Art Deco lighting fixtures tended to make use of stacked geometric patterns.

=== Modern art ===
Modern design grew out of the decorative arts, mostly from the Art Deco, in the early 20th century. One of the first to introduce this modernist style was Frank Lloyd Wright, who had not become hugely popularized until completing the house called Fallingwater in the 1930s. Modern art reached its peak during the 1950s and '60s, which is why designers and decorators today may refer to modern design as being "mid-century". Modern art does not refer to the era or age of design and is not the same as contemporary design, a term used by interior designers for a shifting group of recent styles and trends.

=== Arab materials ===
"Majlis painting", also called nagash painting, is the decoration of the majlis, or front parlor of traditional Arabic homes, in the Asir province of Saudi Arabia and adjoining parts of Yemen. These wall paintings, an arabesque form of mural or fresco, show various geometric designs in bright colors: "Called 'nagash' in Arabic, the wall paintings were a mark of pride for a woman in her house."

The geometric designs and heavy lines seem to be adapted from the area's textile and weaving patterns. "In contrast with the sobriety of architecture and decoration in the rest of Arabia, exuberant color and ornamentation characterize those of Asir. The painting extends into the house over the walls and doors, up the staircases, and onto the furniture itself. When a house is being painted, women from the community help each other finish the job. The building then displays their shared taste and knowledge. Mothers pass these on to their daughters. This artwork is based on a geometry of straight lines and suggests the patterns common to textile weaving, with solid bands of different colors. Certain motifs reappear, such as the triangular mihrab or 'niche' and the palmette. In the past, paint was produced from mineral and vegetable pigments. Cloves and alfalfa yielded green. Blue came from the indigo plant. Red came from pomegranates and a certain mud. Paintbrushes were created from the tough hair found in a goat's tail. Today, however, women use modern manufactured paint to create new looks, which have become an indicator of social and economic change."

Women in the Asir province often complete the decoration and painting of the house interior. "You could tell a family's wealth by the paintings," Um Abdullah says: "If they didn't have much money, the wife could only paint the motholath, the basic straight, simple lines, in patterns of three to six repetitions in red, green, yellow and brown." When women did not want to paint the walls themselves, they could barter with other women who would do the work. Several Saudi women have become famous as majlis painters, such as Fatima Abou Gahas.

The interior walls of the home are brightly painted by the women, who work in defined patterns with lines, triangles, squares, diagonals and tree-like patterns. "Some of the large triangles represent mountains. Zigzag lines stand for water and also for lightning. Small triangles, especially when the widest area is at the top, are found in pre-Islamic representations of female figures. That the small triangles found in the wall paintings in 'Asir are called banat may be a cultural remnant of a long-forgotten past."

"Courtyards and upper pillared porticoes are principal features of the best Nadjdi architecture, in addition to the fine incised plaster wood (jiss) and painted window shutters, which decorate the reception rooms. Good examples of plasterwork can often be seen in the gaping ruins of torn-down buildings- the effect is light, delicate and airy. It is usually around the majlis, around the coffee hearth and along the walls above where guests sat on rugs, against cushions. Doughty wondered if this "parquetting of jis", this "gypsum fretwork... all adorning and unenclosed" originated from India. However, the Najd fretwork seems very different from that seen in the Eastern Province and Oman, which are linked to Indian traditions, and rather resembles the motifs and patterns found in ancient Mesopotamia. The rosette, the star, the triangle and the stepped pinnacle pattern of dadoes are all ancient patterns, and can be found all over the Middle East of antiquity. Al-Qassim Province seems to be the home of this art, and there it is normally worked in hard white plaster (though what you see is usually begrimed by the smoke of the coffee hearth). In Riyadh, examples can be seen in unadorned clay.

=== Sustainable Design ===
Sustainable Design is becoming more important today. This type of style includes eco-friendly, energy efficient, and sustainable design while keeping the space functional. Modern design prioritizes energy efficient design styles and eco-friendly design styles.

== Media popularization ==
Interior design has become the subject of television shows. In the United Kingdom, popular interior design and decorating programs include 60 Minute Makeover (ITV), Changing Rooms (BBC), and Selling Houses (Channel 4). Famous interior designers whose work is featured in these programs include Linda Barker and Laurence Llewelyn-Bowen. In the United States, the TLC Network aired a popular program called Trading Spaces, a show based on the UK program Changing Rooms. In addition, both HGTV and the DIY Network also televise many programs about interior design and decorating, featuring the works of a variety of interior designers, decorators, and home improvement experts in a myriad of projects.

Fictional interior decorators include the Sugarbaker sisters on Designing Women and Grace Adler on Will & Grace. There is also another show called Home MADE. There are two teams and two houses and whoever has the designed and made the worst room, according to the judges, is eliminated. Another show on the Style Network, hosted by Niecy Nash, is Clean House where they re-do messy homes into themed rooms that the clients would like. Other shows include Design on a Dime, Designed to Sell, and The Decorating Adventures of Ambrose Price. The show called Design Star has become more popular through the five seasons that have already aired. The winners of this show end up getting their own TV shows, of which are Color Splash hosted by David Bromstad, Myles of Style hosted by Kim Myles, Paint-Over! hosted by Jennifer Bertrand, The Antonio Treatment hosted by Antonio Ballatore, and finally Secrets from a Stylist hosted by Emily Henderson. Bravo also has a variety of shows that explore the lives of interior designers. These include Flipping Out, which explores the life of Jeff Lewis and his team of designers; Million Dollar Decorators explores the lives of interior designers Nathan Turner, Jeffrey Alan Marks, Mary McDonald, Kathryn Ireland, and Martyn Lawrence Bullard.

Interior design has also become the subject of radio shows. In the U.S., popular interior design & lifestyle shows include Martha Stewart Living and Living Large featuring Karen Mills. Famous interior designers whose work is featured on these programs include Bunny Williams, Barbara Barry, and Kathy Ireland, among others.

Many interior design magazines exist to offer advice regarding color palette, furniture, art, and other elements that fall under the umbrella of interior design. These magazine often focus on related subjects to draw a more specific audience. For instance, architecture as a primary aspect of Dwell, while Veranda is well known as a luxury living magazine. Lonny Magazine and the newly relaunched, Domino Magazine, cater to a young metropolitan audience, and emphasize accessibility and a do-it-yourself (DIY) approach to interior design.

== Gallery ==
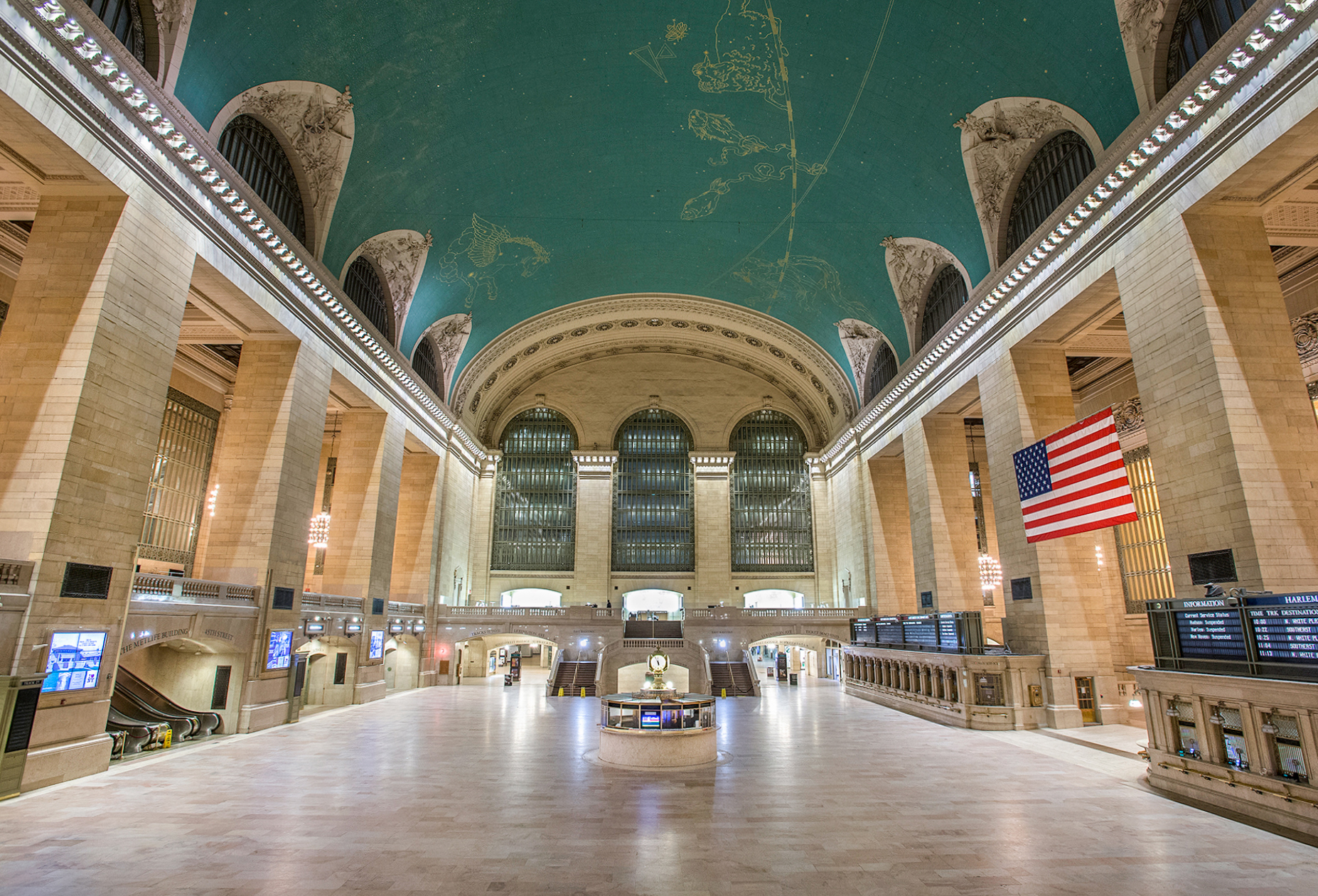
Grand Central Terminal in Midtown Manhattan

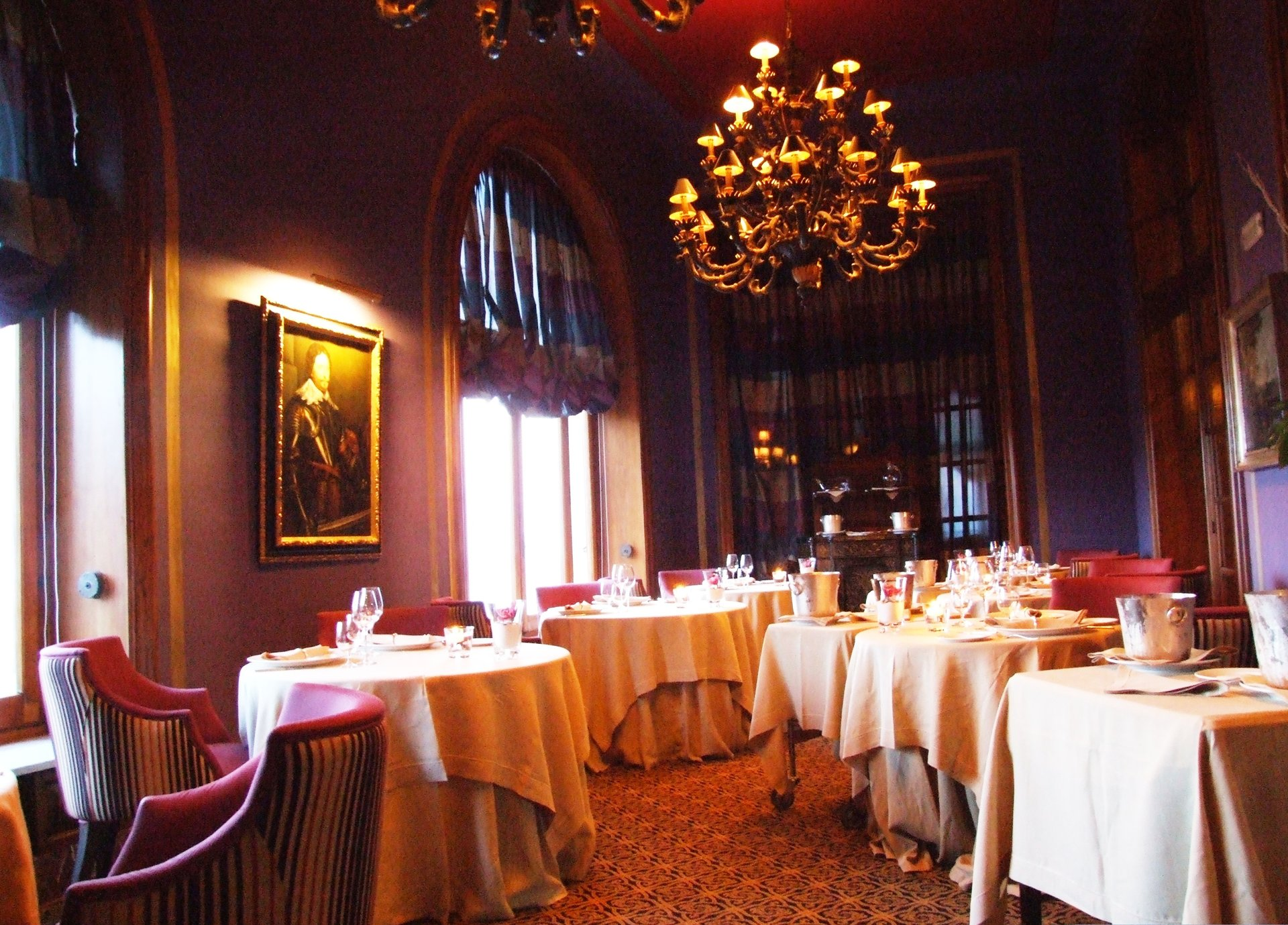
Hotel San Domenico in Taormina

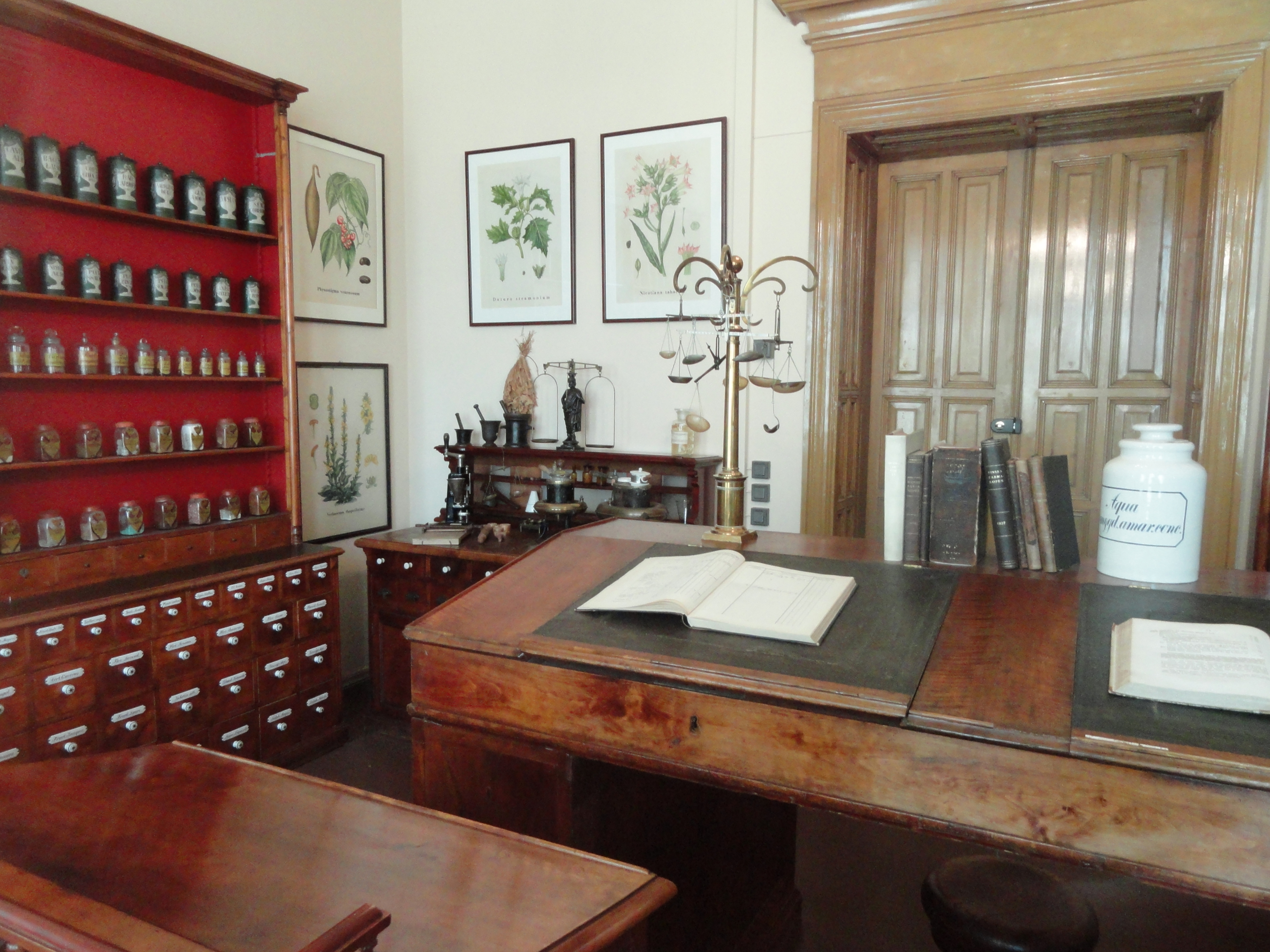
Apothecary room

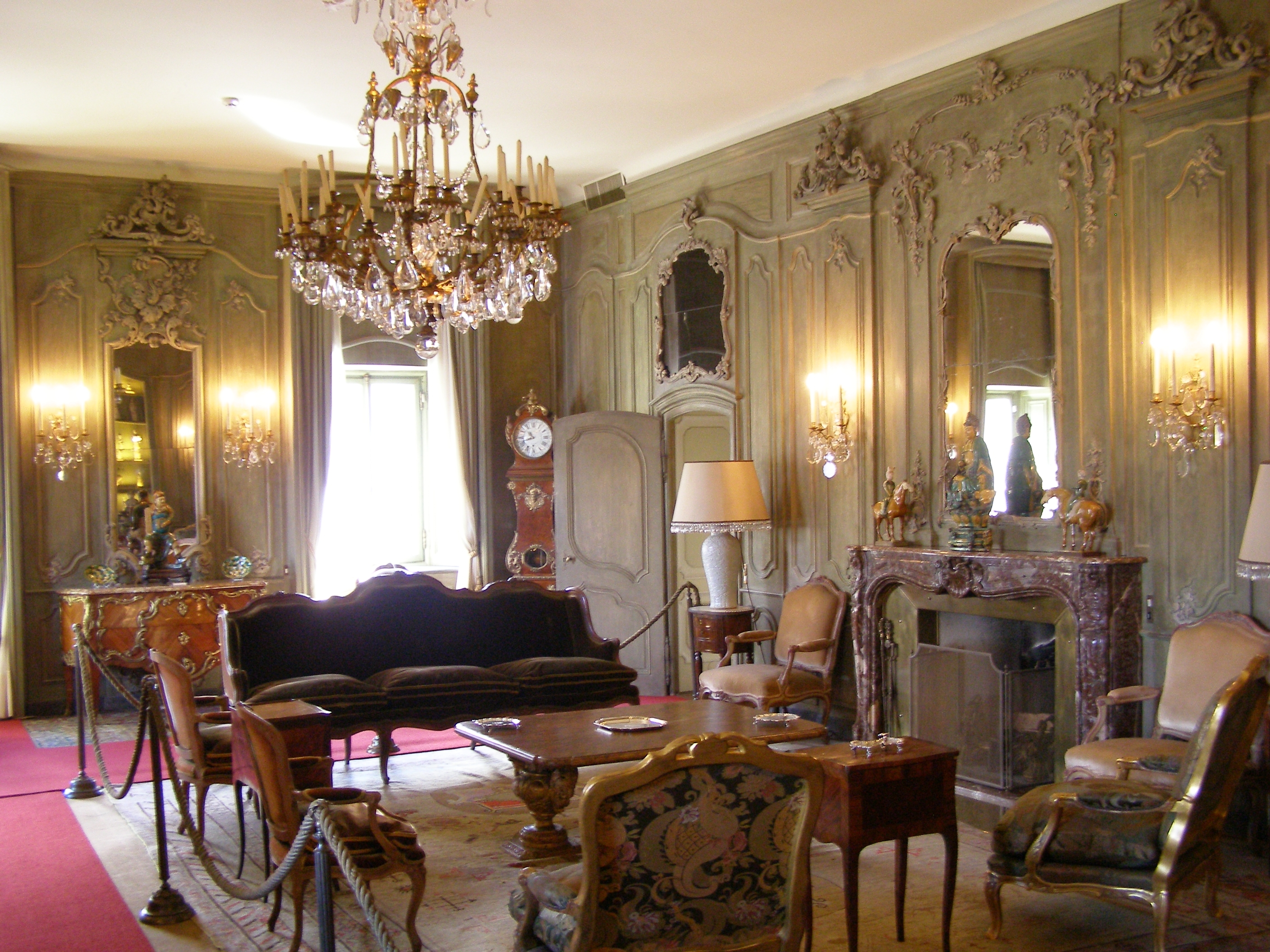
Villa del Balbianello

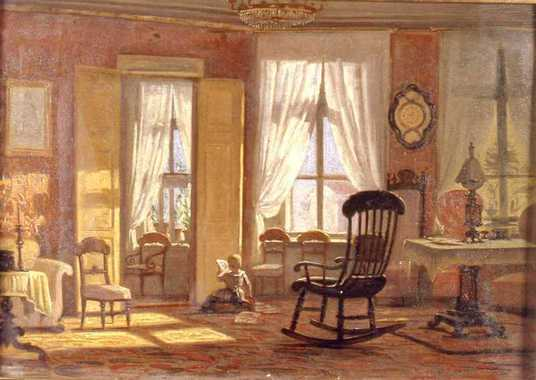
Lounge (1850)

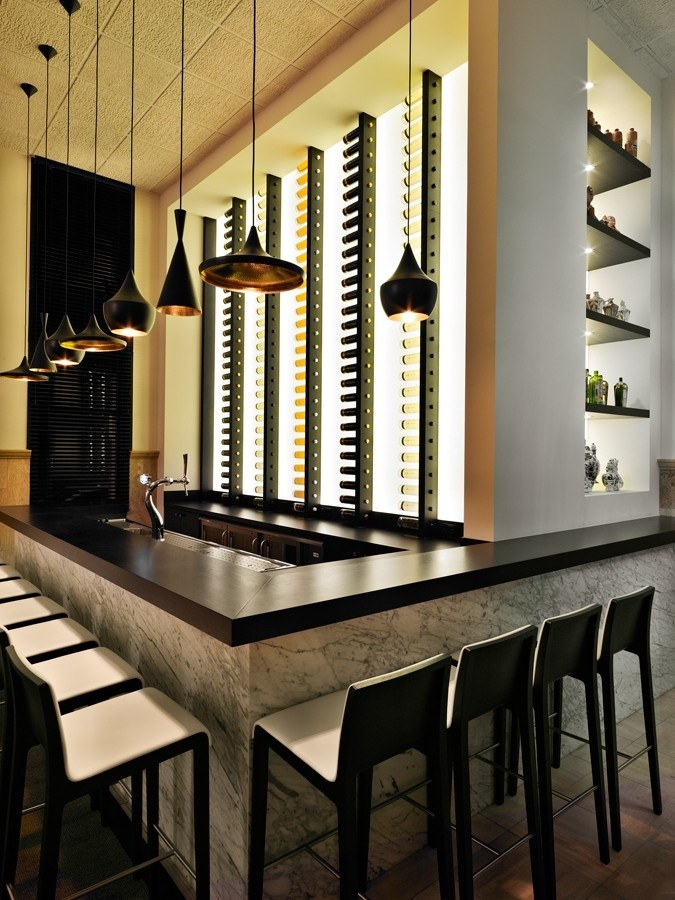
Bar in Rotterdam

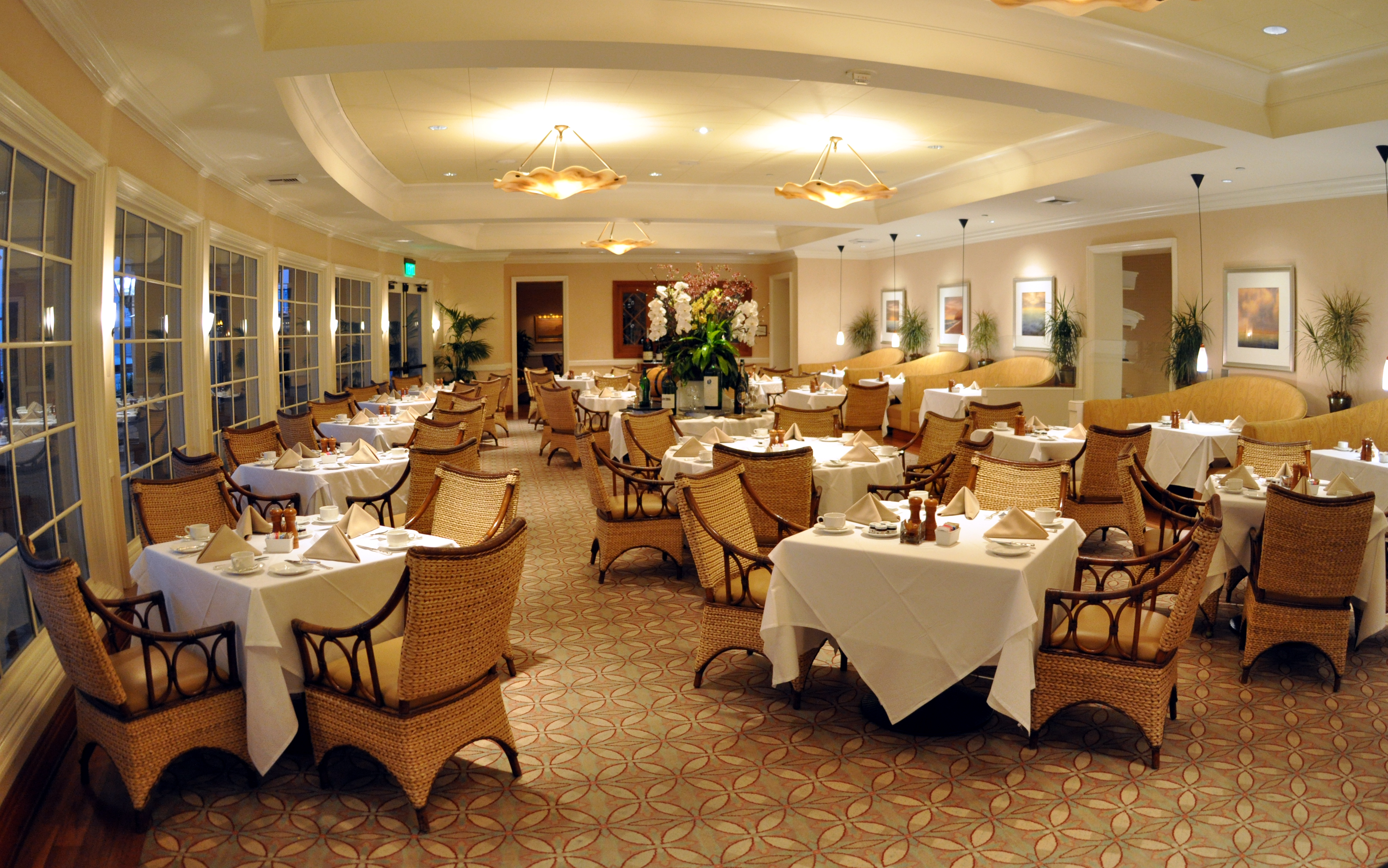
Balboa Bay Club

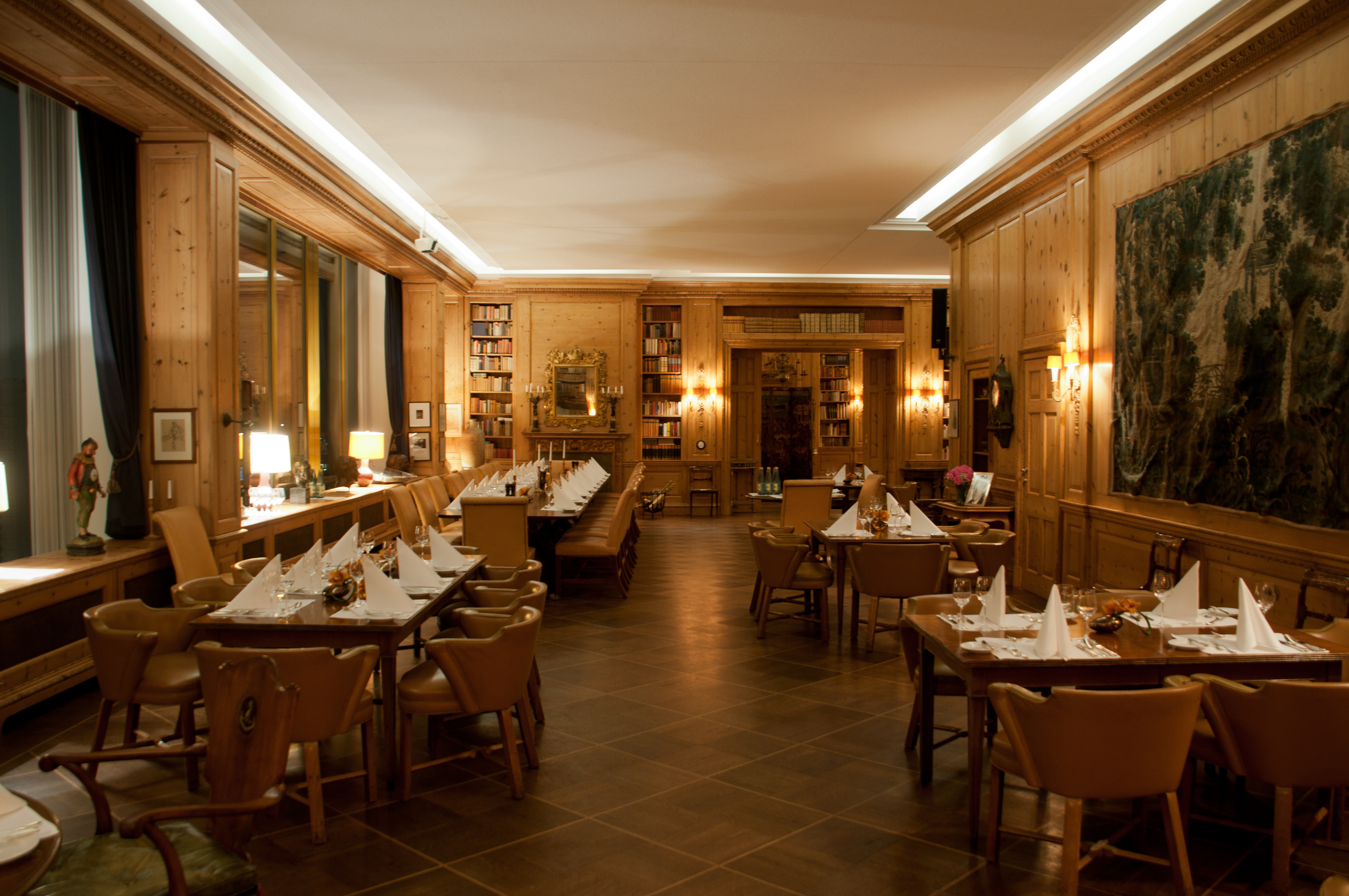
Axel Springer Tower, Berlin

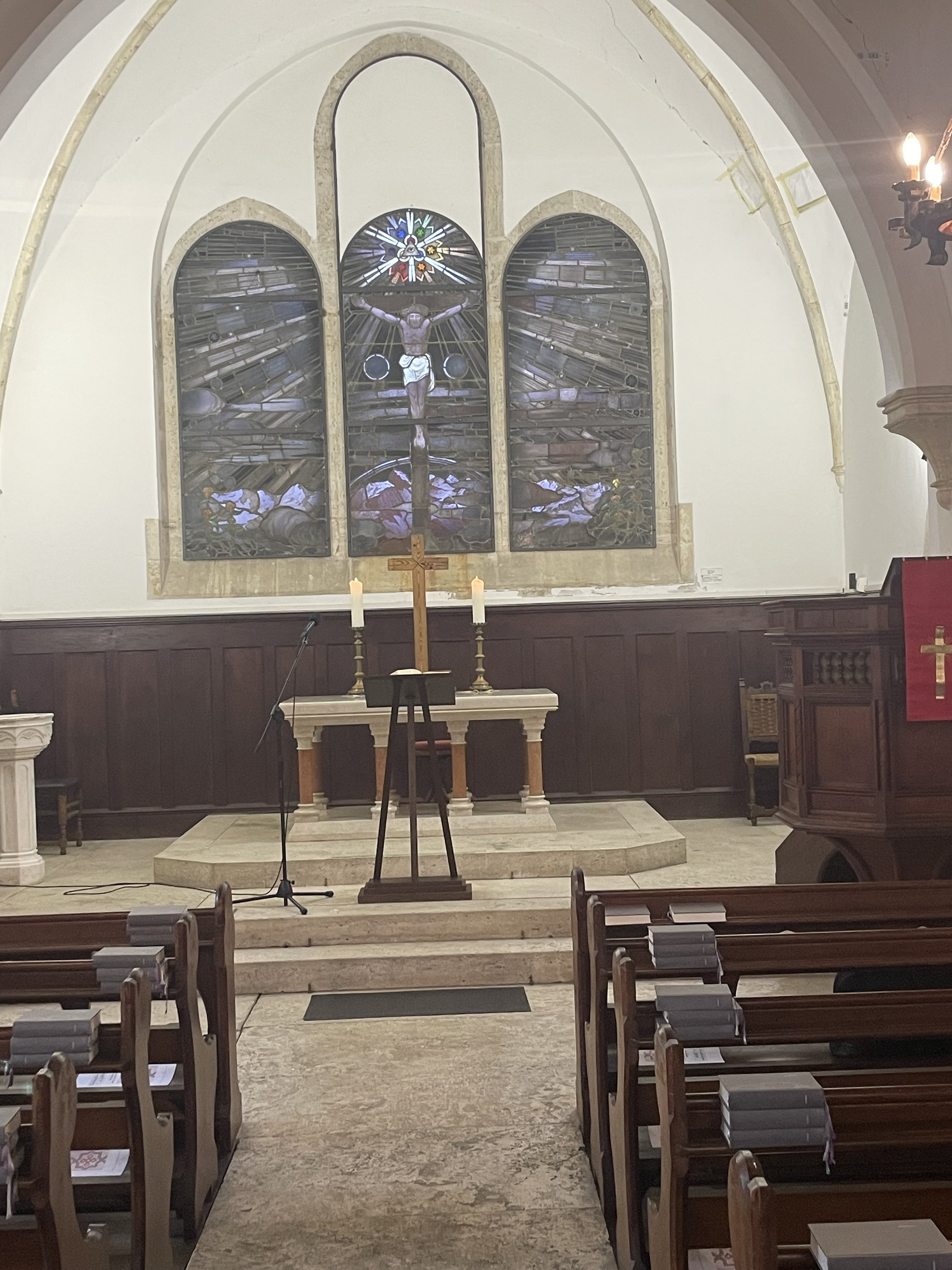
Lutheran church in Nervi

== Notable interior decorators ==
Other early interior decorators:

- Sibyl Colefax
- Dorothy Draper
- Pierre François Léonard Fontaine
- Syrie Maugham
- Margery Hoffman Smith
- Elsie de Wolfe
- Arthur Stannard Vernay
- Frank Lloyd Wright

Many of the most famous designers and decorators during the 20th century had no formal training. Some examples include Alice von Pechmann, Sister Parish, Robert Denning and Vincent Fourcade, Kerry Joyce, Kelly Wearstler, Stéphane Boudin, Georges Geffroy, Emilio Terry, Carlos de Beistegui, Nina Petronzio, Lorenzo Mongiardino, Mary Jean Thompson and David Nightingale Hicks.

Notable interior designers in the world today include Scott Salvator, Troy Adams, Jonathan Adler, Alexa Hampton, Thom Filicia, Michael S. Smith, Martin Brudnizki, Mary Douglas Drysdale, Kelly Hoppen, Kelly Wearstler, Nina Campbell, David Collins, Nate Berkus, Sandra Espinet, Jo Hamilton and Nicky Haslam.

== See also ==
- 1960s decor
- American Society of Interior Designers
- Blueprint
- British Institute of Interior Design
- Chartered Society of Designers
- Environmental psychology
- Experiential interior design
- Fuzzy architectural spatial analysis
- Interior architecture
- Interior design psychology
- Interior design regulation in the United States
- Japanese interior design
- Primitive decorating
- Wall decals
- Window treatment

== Some examples of guides ==
- Mary Gilliatt, New guide to décorating, Little, Brown and Company, 1988, 356 pages. ISBN 978-0316313858.
- Laura Ashley, Complete Guide Home Decorating, Weidenfeld & Nicolson, 1992, 208 pages. ISBN 978-0297831556.
- Stewart Walton, The Decorator's Encyclopedia, Collins & Brown Limited, 1995, 256 pages. ISBN 978-1854702166. Work distinguishing five main parts, namely the architectural styles, the different rooms, the decoration, the furnishing or upholstery fabrics and the finishes.
- Chris Grimley (with Mimi Love), The interior design : Reference & specification book, collection "Everything Architects Need to Know Every Day", Rockport Publishers Inc, 2017, 288 pages. ISBN 978-1631593802.
- Nikki Boyd, Beautifully Organized: A Guide to Function and Style in Your Home, Paige Tate & Co, 2019, 224 pages, ISBN 978-1944515683.
- Shea McGee, The Art of Home: A Designer Guide to Creating an Elevated Yet Approachable Home, Harper Horizon, 2023, 408 pages. ISBN 978-0785236832
- Caitlin Flemming, Julie Goebel, The Essentials: A Guide to Furnishing, Decorating, and Styling Your Home, Abrams, 2025, 304 pages. ISBN 978-1419778780
