= Sandra Espinet =

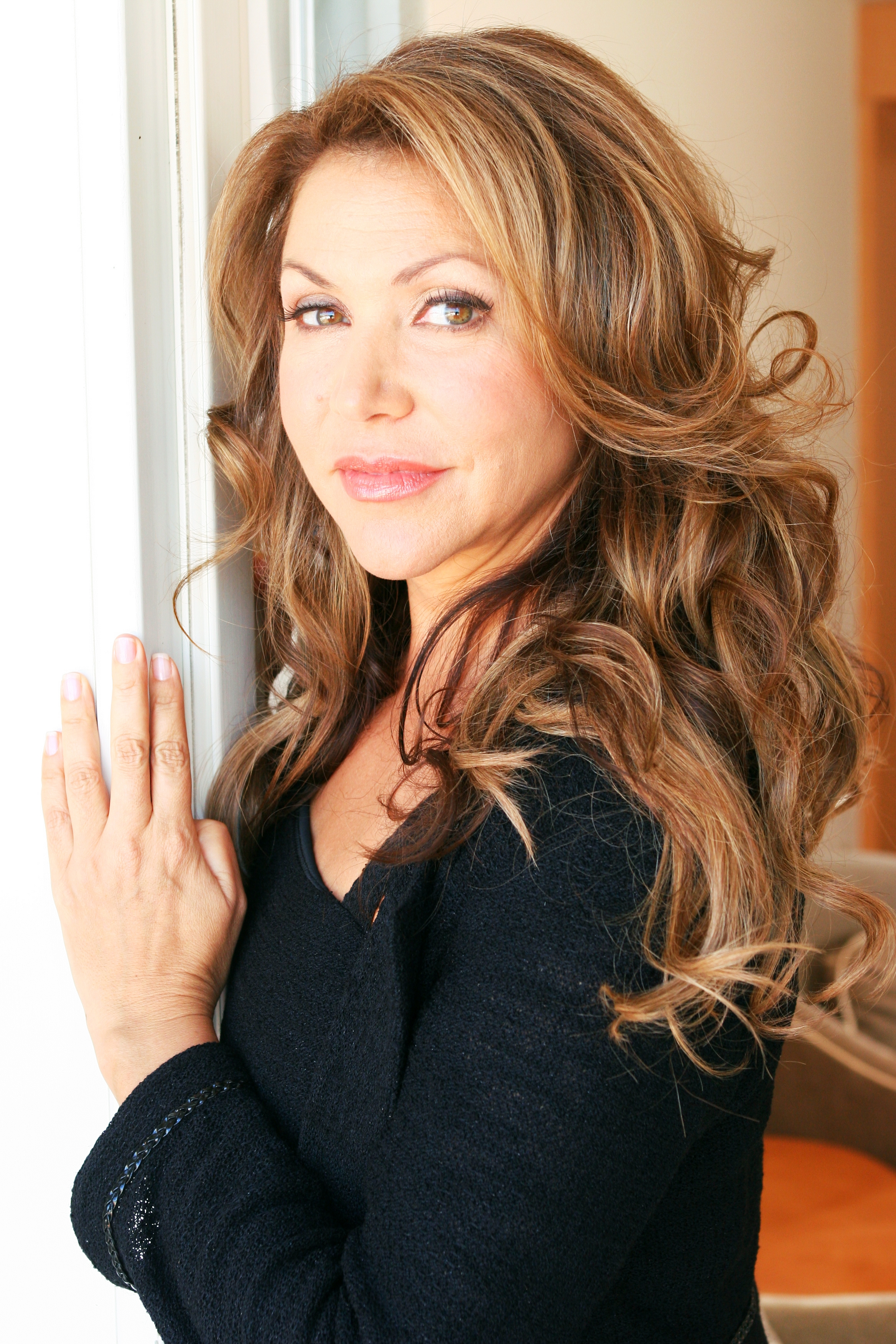
Sandra Kathleen Espinet

Sandra Espinet (born October 31, 1964, in Trinidad and Tobago) is a luxury interior designer who resides in and has offices in both San José del Cabo, Mexico and Los Angeles, California.

== Career ==
Sandra is a HGTV personality, and has appeared on episodes of Bang for Your Buck, Halloween Block Party 2010, HGTV'd' and HGTV’s Celebrity Holiday Homes on which she completed the homes of Holly Robinson Peete in 2009, Brooke Burke and David Charvet in 2010 and Eva LaRue and Alison Sweeney in 2011.

In 2010 she was voted as the “California Home and Design Designer of the Year”. Her design work has been featured in most major publications such as, Cosmopolitan, AD Mexico, IDprestige, Ellie Sojourn, Signature Kitchens and Baths, Home Accents Today, California Home + Design and KB+B. She has appeared as a regular on-air guest on Martha Stewart Living Radio with Mario Bosquez.

Sandra is an ASID member and was the first place 2011 Design Excellence award winner for a home over 35,000 sq. ft. Since 2011, Sandra has been the China style ambassador for Anderson Wood Floor ( a Berkshire Hathaway Company),

Espinet's first book The Well-Traveled Home was published on August 1, 2013. and she is currently working on her second book with publisher Gibbs-Smith.

Sandra was also named one of the top 100 Interior Designers in Mexico by Ambientes Magazine. In 2014, Sandra was a style ambassador for California Faucets. From then to the present, she is on the K+BB editorial advisory board. That year, she designed and launched a line of Tibetan rugs with the “Aga John Rug Company” in Los Angeles.

In December 2016, she was nominated as one of the "top 10 interior designers in Latin America" by Architectural Digest Mexico, December 2016.

== Education ==
Sandra received her Associate in Arts at the New England School of Design in Boston MA, her Bachelor of Arts in interior design from the American College of Art in Atlanta, and has a master's degree in production design from the American Film Institute in Los Angeles.

== See also ==
- Interior designer
- List of interior designers
