= Interior design regulation in the United States =

The objective to enact interior design regulation in the United States began in the 1970s as a way to protect the rights of interior designers to practice and to allow designers to practice to the fullest extent of their abilities. The first title act was established in Alabama in 1982, and since then a total of 22 states have enacted some type of government-sanctioned interior design regulation.

Originally, nearly all states attempting licensure proposed title acts, and a few, to preserve their insure practice rights, have passed practice acts that are also more readily enforced by state agencies, and more.

== Practice regulation ==
A practice statute regulates certain aspects of the practice of interior design to those individuals who have established their credentials with the regulating body. Most interior design practice statutes contain exemptions which allow individuals or businesses to continue practicing in areas not subject to regulation such as residential design. Practice laws include a protective title provision as well. Three states currently restrict the practice of interior design – Louisiana, Nevada, and Florida and two other jurisdictions, District of Columbia and Puerto Rico. A fourth state, Alabama, passed a practice law in 2001 but in 2007 it was struck down by the Alabama Supreme Court.

The State of Florida's interior design practice regulations were the subject of a lawsuit by the Institute for Justice, a non-profit libertarian public interest law firm in the United States. The judge in the case struck down the reservation of the title "interior designer" for registrants in the state on First Amendment grounds and the reserved title for registrants has been changed to "registered interior designer." The practice regulations for commercial interior design were left in place. The judge acknowledged that the existing law already protected the ability for any individual to practice commercial interior decoration

== Title regulation ==
A title restricts the use of the title as defined by that jurisdiction, with titles varying by jurisdictions and precedence in that jurisdiction. The titles currently in use are, “certified interior designer,” “registered interior designer,” and “licensed interior designer”. The titles are restricted to be used only by those who have satisfied minimum competency requirements and accept the accountability required by the government in a regulated profession.

Currently, 19 states have regulation which allows the practice of interior design, but restricts some form of the title to those licensed and regulated persons.

On February 4, 2010, judge Robert Hinkle ruled in that in the state of Florida it is unconstitutional to prohibit the use of the title, "interior designer," "registered interior designer," or "words to that effect" to those not registered.

== See also ==
- Interior design
- Professional licensing
- Rent-seeking
