= James Shoolbred =

Former draper and department store in London

Coordinates: 51.52347°N 0.13701°W

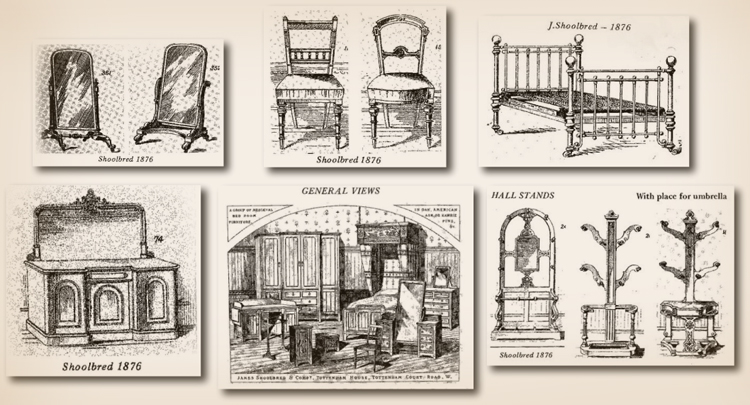
Illustrations from the James Shoolbred & Company's 1876 catalogue

James Shoolbred and Company was a draper and later a department store, located on Tottenham Court Road, London.

James Shoolbred and Co. (a.k.a. Jas Shoolbred) were established in the 1820s at 155 Tottenham Court Road. It was originally a drapers supplying the furniture trade. In the late 1860s/early 1870s the company began designing, manufacturing and selling high quality furniture, of their own design. Their sophisticated designs referenced Regency aesthetics which were informed by antiquity (Greek/Roman styles).

The company's sales catalogue features guides to Victorian home owners about how to put room sets together to achieve a desirable aesthetic, 'a guide to good taste'.

In the 1880s, Shoolbred had opened the city's first large department store on Tottenham Court Road, London. In the mid-1880s Schoolbred was granted a Royal Warrant, testament to the quality of their furniture.

The company ceased trading in 1931.
