= American Society of Interior Designers =

The American Society of Interior Designers (ASID) is a nonprofit organization based in the United States that promotes the profession of interior design. It has chapters throughout the United States and Canada. Throughout all of the associations of ASID within the United States and Canada there are many sections within the American Society of Interior Designers, typically in all different states or areas. Each area typically has a certain number of members who work together on making Interior Design a better place and to help other Interior Designers within the organization. All of these sections are incorporated in typical and beneficial ways to make the organization a better environment for everyone. In ASID, interior designers will all come together and work together as a team. Some of the most important parts of ASID and being involved are the extended History, being a member and what kind of benefits a person shall get as being part of this organization, learning the policies, some issues that can be come across, and what the foundation is all about. To be a member is it good to be qualified as a professional or student interior designer.

== History ==
In 1931, the first national professional organization for decorators, the American Institute of Interior Decorators (AIID), was founded. The organization changed its name to the American Institute of Decorators (AID) in 1936, and to the American Institute of Interior Designers (also known as AID) in 1961. Meanwhile, in 1957, the New York Chapter of the AID changed its name to the National Society for Interior Designers (NSID), emphasizing the title of Interior Designer rather than Decorator. By 1975, there were many clubs and organizations for decorators and interior designers around the country. AID and NSID were the two largest, and they merged to form the American Society of Interior Designers (ASID).

ASID is the largest professional organization for interior designers. ASID members include approximately 13,500 practicing interior designers in both commercial and residential sectors, 5,500 student members, and 6,000 representatives of ASID Industry Partner firms. ASID has Student chapters at colleges, universities and design schools with 2-year and 4-year programs throughout the U.S.

Members are qualified by education, experience and examination, and adhere to a strict code of ethics and professional conduct. Through educational programs, research, seminars and conferences, ASID members receive the most current information on developments in design, as well as appropriate materials, technology, building codes, government regulations, flammability standards, sustainable and green design, product performance, design psychology, occupant populations, and more. ASID also supports legislative and advocacy efforts to protect interior designers' right to practice.

ASID designers practice in all areas of interior design, including:

- Home/Model Homes
- Office/Corporate
- Health Care
- Hospitality/Entertainment
- Government/Institutional
- Retail/Store Planning
- Facilities Management

== Membership ==
ASID has six membership categories

Professional Membership: the highest level of ASID membership. They have completed a course of accredited education and equivalent work experience in interior design and have successfully passed the National Council for Interior Design Qualification (NCIDQ) examination.

Allied Membership: Eligible individuals are practicing interior designers who have completed 40 semester or 60 quarter credit hours in interior design education from an accredited institution (university, college or technical school). Continuing education coursework/hours do not count toward meeting the education requirement for membership.

Educator Membership: This level is for educators who are actively engaged as department chairs or full-time instructors in a post-secondary program of interior design education at any university or accredited school of interior design that requires completion of 40 semester credit hours in interior design-related courses. Eligible educators receive a discounted dues rate as allied or professional members, depending on their qualifications.

Student Advancement Membership:

Student Members: Student members prepare for their career by joining the ASID network. Membership is available to students currently enrolled in an interior design program of at least 40 credit hours or 60 quarter credit hours of interior design coursework to graduate.

Industry Partner Membership: Industry Partners join ASID to gain access to the designer and student community. Members include interior design industry manufacturers and their representatives, related trade associations and market centers.

All ASID members have the opportunity to be involved with a local chapter.

== Member benefits and events ==
=== Research and publications ===
- ASID ICON, the Society's magazine, the publication for interior design professionals. Published six times a year, ASID ICON includes design research and business trends, along with information on key Society and chapter issues and events.
- ASID NewsFlash delivers design and Society news biweekly via e-mail.
- ASID is a key nonprofit provider of information, knowledge and research for the interior design industry. Each year, ASID distributes more than 200,000 research and business publications through mail orders, online and at design conferences.
- Eye on Design, a weekly industry newsletter exclusively for members, sent via e-mail, which provides research on current, newsworthy items within the industry.
- The ASID Web site features information, news, publications, marketing materials and other resources for professional designers, design students and the public. The site includes the Sustainable Design Resource Center and the Universal Design Resource Center, as well as the ASID Referral Service.

=== Events ===
- ASID features educational programs at major national meetings such as NeoCon, Hospitality Design Expo and Greenbuild that can be used for continuing education units (CEU) for Society and state CEU requirements. All of ASID's CEUs are accredited by the Interior Design Continuing Education Council.
- The event that is planned for the year 2023, will be held in Los Angeles California, a conference held by ASID called GATHER 2023 starting on the date August 13, 2023.
- The most recent event being held was on October 19, 2022 which will be online.

== Legislative Policy ==
ASID revised its legislative policy in January 2009 to better reflect the organization's goals and its members' interests. The policy states:

1. ASID supports the pursuit of legal recognition of the profession of interior design. In doing so, ASID believes accomplishing legal recognition is best achieved through the enactment of legislation that:

a. Does not limit, restrict or prevent the practice of interior design;
b. Does not limit, restrict or prevent anyone from using the title "interior design" or "interior designer;"
c. Allows state-qualified designers to:
- Use the titles "registered," "certified," or "licensed interior designer," and
- Perform additional services related to interior design when governing jurisdictions find it appropriate. (amended 1/09)

2. ASID supports the National Council for Interior Design Qualifications (NCIDQ) as the body whose professional exam tests minimum competency for state qualified interior designers.

ASID's multiyear effort to expand registered interior designers' practice rights across the U.S. has been successful in North Carolina, Oklahoma, Wisconsin, and Illinois. These bills extend interior design capabilities and allow practitioners to actively engage in fostering safe environments with their understanding of safety codes.

== Platform Issues ==
ASID has embraced two platform issues: sustainable design and designing for an aging population.

== ASID Foundation ==
Created in 1975, the nonprofit organization now known as the ASID Foundation is the affiliated 501(c)(3) charitable organization of the American Society of Interior Designers (ASID). The foundation supports activities related to the development and dissemination of knowledge in interior design, including research, scholarship, and education. Its stated areas of focus include promoting innovation and addressing the health, safety, and welfare of the public through interior design.

== See also ==
- Interior Design
- Interior design regulation in the United States
