= Open Road Integrated Media =

American digital media company

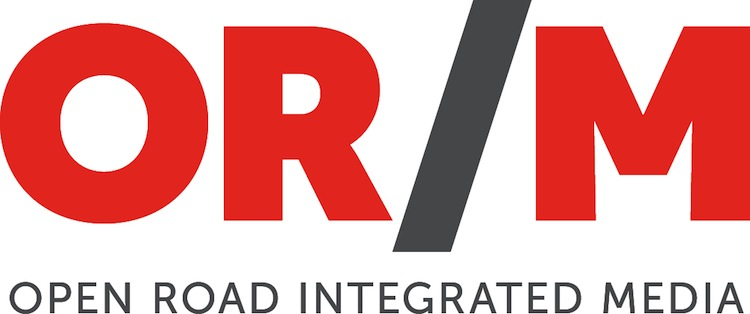
- Founded: 2009; 17 years ago
- Founder: Jane Friedman and Jeffrey Sharp
- Country of origin: United States
- Headquarters location: New York City
- Key people: David Steinberger (CEO)
- Publication types: Books, ebooks, websites
- Imprints: Re-Discovery Lit, Open Road Media, Open Road Media Young Readers, Bloodhound Books
- Official website: openroadmedia.com

Open Road Integrated Media or ORIM (stylized as OR/M and also called Open Road) is a digital media company in New York City that was created by Jane Friedman and Jeffrey Sharp in 2009 with a focus on publishing ebook editions of older works of literature and nonfiction. In addition to its ebook publishing business, Open Road Integrated Media is the parent company of book publisher Open Road Media and content brands Early Bird Books, The Lineup, The Archive, Murder & Mayhem, A Love So True, and The Portalist.

Publishing veteran David Steinberger and an investment group including Abry Partners, MEP Capital, and Grove Atlantic acquired the company in 2021, and Steinberger was named CEO in 2022.

== History ==
Former HarperCollins CEO Jane Friedman and film producer Jeffrey Sharp launched Open Road Integrated Media with the goal of bringing backlist books back to life in digital formats and partnering with writers of contemporary and classic works. The Open Road Media catalog includes authors such as William Styron, Pat Conroy, Joan Didion, Samuel R. Delany, Alice Walker, John Ashbery, Robin McKinley, Michael Chabon, Sherman Alexie, Pearl S. Buck, Elizabeth Lynn and Dee Brown.

In 2011, HarperCollins filed a copyright infringement suit against Open Road over the ebook edition of children's novel Julie of the Wolves by Jean Craighead George. The suit disputed whether book contracts written before the existence of ebooks granted publishers digital rights or whether they were retained by the author. In March 2014, the New York district court judge ruled in favor of HarperCollins, stating that the contract language included digital rights.

After acquiring the content of independent publishers E-Reads and Premier Digital in 2014, and signing deals with other publishers and authors, the Open Road Media catalog expanded to 10,000 titles by 2015.

Media veteran Paul Slavin joined the company as president in 2015 and was named CEO in 2016.

In 2016, Open Road partnered with OverDrive, Inc. to provide browser-based ebooks to elementary school libraries.

In July 2021, the company acquired the independent Cambridge, UK ebook publisher Bloodhound Books.

David Steinberger, formerly CEO of Perseus Books Group and Arcadia Publishing, led an investment group that acquired Open Road Integrated Media in 2021. The sale was reported to be between $60 and $80 million. Steinberger became CEO in January 2022.

In May 2023, Open Road launched Re-Discovery Lit, an imprint to publish books that had gone out of print or otherwise been reverted by publishers back to authors. According to The New York Times, Re-Discovery Lit utilizes Open Road's "machine learning technology" to find readers for these republished works, which include books by authors such as Barbara Delinsky and Roger Angell.

== Imprints ==
- Re-Discovery Lit
- Open Road Media
- Open Road Media Young Readers
- Bloodhound Books
