= Deborah Needleman =

American editor and writer

- Born: November 23
- Education: George Washington University
- Occupation: Editor
- Spouse: Jacob Weisberg
- Children: 2

Deborah Needleman is an American editor and writer. She was editor-in-chief of T: The New York Times Style Magazine and WSJ Magazine. She was also the creator of the paper's weekend lifestyle section and the founding editor-in-chief of Domino magazine.

== Early life ==
Needleman grew up in Cherry Hill, New Jersey, and graduated from George Washington University where she studied philosophy and art history.

== Career ==
Needleman worked as a photographer's assistant before becoming the photo editor at The Washington Post Sunday magazine. She wrote about gardens and design for The New York Times, Slate, and House & Garden, where she was an editor.

== T Magazine ==
In 2012, Needleman was named editor of T: The New York Times Style Magazine.

The first issue of T under her editorship featured Lee Radziwill on the cover, for which she and Sofia Coppola produced a short film.

In October 2015, Needleman was sharply criticized by T Magazine readers and then-New York Times public editor Margaret Sullivan for conflicts of interest created by her assignment of Laura Arrillaga-Andreessen—wife of billionaire Marc Andreessen—to a feature that appeared in the October 12, 2015, issue titled "Five Visionary Tech Entrepreneurs Who Are Changing the World". The criticism centered around the lack of disclosure that Arrillaga-Andreessen was "not only married to a major player in the tech world, but one who is a major investor in one of the companies she featured". When Sullivan asked Needleman to respond to the controversy, she admitted the error.

Washington Post media critic Erik Wemple criticized Needleman and T Magazine for having "disappeared tech entrepreneur Elizabeth Holmes" from the October 12, 2015, feature on tech visionaries after The Wall Street Journal reported that Holmes and Theranos—the blood testing company Holmes founded and was then chief executive of—appeared to be misleading consumers and investors. Holmes was subsequently charged with perpetrating "massive fraud" by the Securities and Exchange Commission and resigned in disgrace.

One of Needleman's last issues, in October 2016, was themed "The Greats" and had seven different covers featuring Michelle Obama, Zadie Smith, William Eggleston, Kerry James Marshall, Junya Watanabe, Lady Gaga, and Massimo Bottura.

== WSJ ==
The newspaper section Needleman created was called "Off Duty". It published on Saturdays, covering fashion, tech, design, and food. The name was suggested by her husband. While launching the section for the paper in 2010, Needleman agreed to become the editor in chief of WSJ. magazine.

== domino magazine ==
Launched by Condé Nast Publications in 2005, Domino was a decorating style magazine centered on the home. In its first year, domino was honored with The Hot List Startup of the Year by Adweek, Top Launch of the Year by Media Industry Newsletter and The A-List 10 under 50 by Advertising Age. In its third year, the magazine grew to a rate base of 800K. By the time it closed, it had a circulation of 1 million. The magazine received two 2008 National Magazine Award nominations from the American Society of Magazine Editors (ASME).

== Personal ==
Needleman lives in Manhattan with her husband, Jacob Weisberg, the co-founder with Malcolm Gladwell of Pushkin Industries, a podcasting and audio production company, and their two children. She is the author of The Perfectly Imperfect Home, an illustrated treatise on home decorating; and co-author of Domino: The Book of Decorating. She is on the board of the National Book Foundation and the Modernism Advisory Council of the World Monument Fund.
