= Anne Trubek =

American author and publisher

- Born: June 30, 1966 (age 60)
- Occupation: Author
- Employer: Belt Magazine
- Children: 1

Academic background
- Education: Oberlin College; Temple University
- Thesis: Picturing time: American realism and the problem of perspective (1998)
- Website: annetrubek.com

Anne Trubek (born 1966) is an author and founder and director of Belt Magazine. She has written The History and Uncertain Future of Handwriting, and A Skeptic’s Guide to Writers’ Houses.

== Biography ==
=== Career ===
She co-edited Rust Belt Chic: The Cleveland Anthology and edited Voices from the Rust Belt. Rust Belt Chic became serialized as Belt Magazine, a web publication and the first publication from Belt Publishing. Since Trubek founded it as a membership-driven nonprofit in 2013, Belt Publishing has brought out essay collections, guidebooks, and fiction about the culture and landscapes of the Midwest, developing a reputation for combining a regional focus with political and intellectual seriousness and a sense of literary history. Trubek also publishes articles about the Midwest in other media, as for instance her 2016 essay in The Atlantic on her "low-overhead life" in the Midwest, an article that was a response to Neal Gabler's essay on his own troubled finances.

Trubek was a professor of rhetoric and composition at Oberlin College between 1997 and 2015, and then began freelance writing to earn more money. She was a literary columnist for GOOD Magazine. Trubek's works are often concerned with the social history of widespread aspects of reading and writing, including the history of handwriting—she was an early advocate of phasing out the teaching of cursive—the emergence of paperback novels, and the trend toward making popular writers’ houses into museums.

=== Personal life ===
Trubek is from Madison, Wisconsin. She attended Oberlin College. She has been divorced since 2002 and has one son.
