= Ella's law =

Proposed United Kingdom clean air legislation

Ella's Law
- Official title: Clean Air (Human Rights) Bill
- First introduced: 2018
- Named after: Ella Adoo-Kissi-Debrah
- Purpose: Establishing a legal right to breathe clean air in the United Kingdom
- Proposed by: Jenny Jones, Baroness Jones of Moulsecoomb, Caroline Lucas and Siân Berry
- Status: Proposed legislation

Ella's Law is the informal name given to a British environmental campaign seeking reform of air pollution legislation in the United Kingdom. The campaign advocates the introduction of the proposed Clean Air (Human Rights) Bill, which is intended to establish a legal right to breathe clean air in England. The proposed legislation is named after Ella Adoo-Kissi-Debrah, a nine-year-old girl whose death from asthma in 2013 was found by a coroner to have been contributed to by exposure to excessive air pollution. She became the first person in the United Kingdom to have air pollution recorded as a medical cause of death.

Versions of the Clean Air (Human Rights) Bill have been introduced in the House of Lords and House of Commons by Green parliamentarians including Jenny Jones, Baroness Jones of Moulsecoomb, Caroline Lucas and Siân Berry. The most advanced version completed its stages in the House of Lords in December 2022 but did not complete its passage through the Commons. A further version was introduced by Berry in July 2025, but made no further progress following the end of the 2024–2026 parliamentary session.

The proposals have received cross-party parliamentary support as well as backing from the London Assembly, the Mayor of London, health organisations and environmental campaign groups. The UK Government has supported the objective of reducing air pollution but has previously argued that separate clean-air human-rights legislation is unnecessary.

== Background ==
=== Death of Ella Adoo-Kissi-Debrah ===
Ella Adoo-Kissi-Debrah lived close to the South Circular Road in Lewisham, south-east London. She developed severe asthma and was admitted to hospital on numerous occasions before dying on 15 February 2013, aged nine.

An initial inquest held in 2014 concluded that Ella died from acute respiratory failure caused by severe asthma, but did not examine the possible contribution of air pollution. Following the emergence of new expert evidence, the High Court quashed the original inquest and ordered a new one in 2019.

The second inquest concluded in December 2020 that Ella had died from asthma contributed to by exposure to excessive air pollution. The medical cause of death recorded acute respiratory failure, severe asthma and air pollution exposure. The coroner found that levels of nitrogen dioxide near Ella's home had exceeded statutory limits and that concentrations of particulate matter had exceeded World Health Organization guidelines.

In April 2021, the coroner issued a report to prevent future deaths. It raised concerns about the absence of legally binding targets based on World Health Organization guidelines, insufficient public information about the health effects of air pollution and a lack of awareness among medical professionals.

=== Campaign for clean air legislation ===
Following her daughter's death, Ella's mother, Rosamund Adoo-Kissi-Debrah, became a campaigner for stronger air-quality laws and greater public awareness of the health effects of pollution. She co-founded the Ella Roberta Foundation and campaigned for a statutory right to breathe clean air.

Although proposals for a Clean Air (Human Rights) Bill had been introduced before the conclusion of Ella's second inquest, the legislation subsequently became associated with her case and was publicly referred to as “Ella's Law”. During the Bill's second reading in the House of Lords in July 2022, Baroness Jones said that it had been named in Ella's honour following Adoo-Kissi-Debrah's campaign.

In 2024, Adoo-Kissi-Debrah brought legal proceedings against three government departments over her daughter's illness and death. The case was settled in October 2024, with the Government offering an apology and an undisclosed financial settlement. Adoo-Kissi-Debrah continued to campaign for Ella's Law following the settlement.

== Legislative history ==
=== Early bills ===
Baroness Jones introduced an early Clean Air (Human Rights) Bill in the 2017–2019 parliamentary session. The private member's bill received its first reading in the House of Lords on 5 July 2018 but made no further progress before Parliament was prorogued.

A further version was introduced during the 2019–2021 session. Like the earlier proposal, it originated in the House of Lords but did not complete its parliamentary stages.

=== 2022 House of Lords bill ===
Baroness Jones introduced a revised Clean Air (Human Rights) Bill in the 2022–2023 session. It received its second reading on 8 July 2022. During the debate, Jones described the proposal as a comprehensive clean-air bill and called for it to become “Ella's law” before the tenth anniversary of Ella's death.

Peers from different political parties spoke in support of the Bill's aims during its passage. They included Conservative peers Baroness Altmann and Lord Randall of Uxbridge, and Labour peers including Lord Blunkett and Baroness Hayman of Ullock.

The Bill completed its committee stage on 18 November 2022. Amendments agreed during committee included provisions relating to local-authority duties, pollutants from indoor combustion and the monitoring of smaller particulate matter.

It received its third reading and passed the House of Lords on 2 December 2022. It was subsequently presented in the House of Commons, where Caroline Lucas acted as its Commons sponsor, but it did not receive the parliamentary time required to complete its remaining stages.

=== 2024 House of Commons bill ===
On 17 January 2024, Caroline Lucas introduced another Clean Air (Human Rights) Bill in the House of Commons under the Ten Minute Rule. Lucas argued that existing legislation had failed to protect people from harmful pollution and said that the Bill would make the right to breathe clean air legally enforceable.

The Bill proposed duties on the Secretary of State and public authorities, a role for the UK Health Security Agency in setting pollution limits and the creation of a Citizens' Commission for Clean Air. It did not complete its parliamentary passage before the 2024 United Kingdom general election.

=== 2025–2026 House of Commons bill ===
On 1 July 2025, Green MP Siân Berry introduced a further version of the Bill in the House of Commons. Berry described the legislation as Ella's Law and presented it with cross-party support. Adoo-Kissi-Debrah and members of Ella's family attended the introduction.

The published Bill proposed that clean air should be achieved throughout England by 1 January 2030 and that air-quality standards should follow a pathway towards compliance with World Health Organization guidelines.

In March 2026, Berry stated in the Commons that the Bill had been published alongside the Ella Roberta Foundation, Mums for Lungs, Clean Air in London, Asthma + Lung UK and Global Action Plan.

The parliamentary session ended before the Bill received its second reading, and it consequently made no further progress.

== Provisions ==
The precise contents of Ella's Law have varied between parliamentary sessions. The bills have generally sought to establish a statutory human right to breathe clean air and to place a corresponding duty on the Secretary of State to achieve and maintain specified air-quality standards.

The 2025–2026 Bill proposed to:

- establish a right to breathe clean air;
- require the Secretary of State to achieve and maintain clean air throughout England;
- introduce environmental targets and minimum air-quality standards;
- establish duties and functions for public bodies in relation to air pollution;
- give the Office for Environmental Protection additional clean-air powers and duties;
- require compliance with the Convention on Long-Range Transboundary Air Pollution; and
- require ministers and public authorities to apply specified environmental principles when carrying out functions under the legislation.

Previous versions also contained detailed provisions concerning indoor and outdoor pollution, monitoring, public information, enforcement, the review of pollutant limits and the ability of individuals or public bodies to seek legal remedies when duties were not met.

== Support ==
=== Parliamentary support ===
The 2022 House of Lords Bill received support from members of several political parties during its parliamentary stages. It completed all of its Lords stages without a division preventing its passage to the Commons.

An early day motion introduced by Liberal Democrat MP Wera Hobhouse in December 2022 welcomed the Bill after its third reading in the House of Lords. The motion stated that it had secured significant cross-party support and called on the Government to support it. It received 63 signatures from MPs representing several political parties.

A second early day motion in February 2024 welcomed the version introduced by Caroline Lucas and called on the Government to support the legislation as a means of achieving clean air and preventing future deaths.

Political sponsors and prominent parliamentary supporters have included:

- Jenny Jones, Baroness Jones of Moulsecoomb, Green member of the House of Lords, Introduced successive Lords bills and sponsored the 2022 Bill through all its Lords stages.
- Caroline Lucas, Green MP for Brighton Pavillion sponsored the 2022 Bill in the Commons and introduced a further Commons Bill in January 2024.
- Siân Berry, Green MP for Brighton Pavilion, Introduced the 2025 Commons Bill and published a revised version in March 2026.
- Wera Hobhouse, Liberal Democrat MP for Bath, Sponsored the 2022 early day motion calling for government support for Ella's Law.

=== Health and environmental organisations ===
The campaign has been supported by health and environmental organisations. In February 2023, the UK Health Alliance on Climate Change published a call from health leaders urging MPs to support Ella's Law. The organisation said that the Bill would establish a right to breathe clean air and provide a framework for reducing pollution to safer limits.

The Royal College of Paediatrics and Child Health has called for Ella's Law to be passed as part of wider action to protect children from air pollution.

In November 2025, the Faculty of Public Health, Royal College of Paediatrics and Child Health and British Association for Community Child Health issued a joint statement supporting the reintroduction of the Clean Air (Human Rights) Bill. They described it as a measure that would require the Government to work towards World Health Organization air-quality standards and recognise clean air as a human right.

A 2023 article in The BMJ argued that Ella's Law could provide a mechanism for requiring government action and raising air pollution higher on the political agenda.

Organisations involved in the publication or promotion of later versions of the legislation have included:

- the Ella Roberta Foundation;
- Asthma + Lung UK;
- Mums for Lungs;
- Clean Air in London;
- Global Action Plan;
- the Faculty of Public Health;
- the Royal College of Paediatrics and Child Health; and
- the British Association for Community Child Health.

=== Local government ===
On 29 November 2022, the London Assembly agreed a motion supporting Ella's Law and urging Members of Parliament and members of the House of Lords to support the Bill. The motion was proposed by Green Assembly Member Zack Polanski to coincide with the seventieth anniversary of the Great Smog of London.

The Mayor of London, Sadiq Khan, subsequently confirmed his support for Ella's Law. In February 2024, while issuing an apology on behalf of the Greater London Authority for its role in the circumstances surrounding Ella Adoo-Kissi-Debrah's death, Khan called on the Government to adopt the legislation.

In September 2025, Charnwood Borough Council passed a motion supporting the Clean Air (Human Rights) Bill and calling for stronger national air-quality legislation.

=== Campaigners and public figures ===
Rosamund Adoo-Kissi-Debrah has been the principal public campaigner associated with Ella's Law. Her work has included campaigning through the Ella Roberta Foundation, meeting politicians and health professionals and calling for legally enforceable clean-air standards.

Professor Stephen Holgate, whose expert evidence helped secure Ella's second inquest, has also supported stronger legal action on air pollution and contributed to the scientific background to the campaign.

Clean Air in London founder Simon Birkett has worked on successive versions of the Clean Air (Human Rights) Bill and has promoted the legal recognition of a right to clean air.

Political figures who have publicly promoted the campaign include Baroness Jones, Caroline Lucas, Siân Berry, Zack Polanski and Sadiq Khan.

== Reception and government response ==
Supporters of Ella's Law have argued that existing UK air-quality legislation is fragmented, insufficiently enforceable and does not provide individuals with a clear legal right to clean air. They have also argued that statutory standards should reflect World Health Organization guidance rather than merely existing domestic targets.

The Government has not supported the introduction of Ella's Law. In a January 2024 response to a parliamentary petition, it stated that it was committed to reducing air pollution but argued that the existing legislative framework already provided appropriate powers, accountability and enforcement mechanisms. It cited the Environment Act 2021, national emissions ceilings and local-authority air-quality duties as elements of the existing framework.

The petition, which requested parliamentary time for the Bill, received 13,183 signatures before closing in December 2023.

Health organisations have continued to argue that stronger legislation is required. In 2025, reporting on research by the Royal College of Physicians stated that air pollution was associated with more than 500 deaths a week in the United Kingdom and costs arising from ill health, healthcare and lost productivity. The College and other campaigners called for clean air to be treated as a fundamental right.

== See also ==
- Rosamund Adoo-Kissi-Debrah
- Air pollution in the United Kingdom
- Clean Air Act 1956
- Clean Air Act 1993
- Environment Act 2021
- Environmental law
- Right to a healthy environment
- Zane's Law
