= Dara Caponigro =

American interior design expert, editor and author

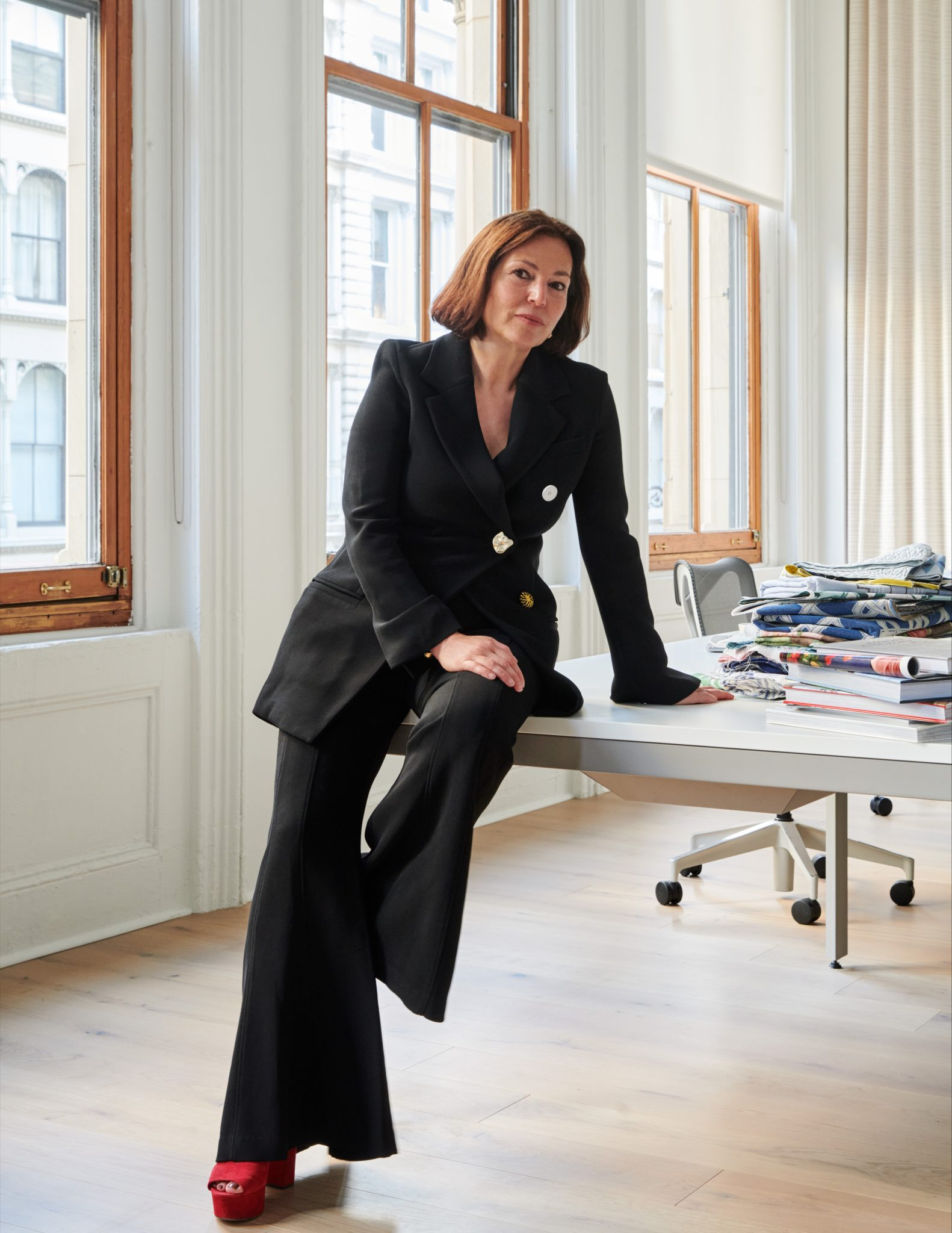
Décor author and editor Dara Caponigro

Dara Caponigro is a design executive and editor of design magazines, currently Chief Creative Officer for the design house F. Schumacher & Co. and Editor-in-Chief of the design magazine, Frederic. Over her career as a magazine editor she has held senior roles at House Beautiful, Elle Décor, Domino and Veranda Caponigro is the author or co-author of a number of books about design. Caponigro's personal style choices, including the homes that she has lived in, have been the subject of numerous publications.

== Early life ==
Dara Caponigro was born in the Bronx, NY, graduated from Suffern High School, and attended Barnard College, where she graduated Magna Cum Laude and Phi Beta Kappa.

== Magazine career ==
Before the start of her magazine and design career, Caponigro’s first job was with the Bronx Zoo, followed by a stint at the Cooper Hewitt Museum. In 1986 she began working at House Beautiful magazine, owned by Hearst as an Editorial Assistant, rising to Decoration Director under Editor-in-Chief Louis Oliver Gropp. In that role she contributed to the discovery of emerging interior designers who would go on to high profile acclaim, including Miles Redd, Thomas O’Brien, Sheila Bridges, and Vicente Wolf.

In 2000 she left House Beautiful to become Design and Decoration Director at Elle Décor magazine, owned at that time by Hachette Filipacchi. In 2004 she joined Condé Nast as Style Director at Domino magazine. Although Domino won a "cult" following and received multiple honors including being named Hot List Start Up of the Year by Adweek, it was closed by Condé Nast during the financial crisis in 2009.

In the spring of 2010 Caponigro returned to Hearst as Editor-in-Chief of Veranda magazine, contributing to its transition from a primarily regional southern magazine to one with more of a national audience. She left Hearst in 2013.

== F. Schumacher & Company ==
In 2013 she joined F. Schumacher & Company, the iconic design house, originally founded in 1889, as Creative Director. Caponigro launched exclusive collections with high profile designers including Miles Redd, and with prominent brands including Vogue. She also reintroduced significant designs from the company’s past, including a fabric created by Stanford White for the Theodore Roosevelt White House in 1902 which Jacqueline Kennedy later had reinstalled. In 2021, Caponigro was later named Schumacher’s Chief Creative Officer.

In 2015, Caponigro launched the Schumacher Bulletin, which was re-branded as Frederic magazine with Caponigro as Editor-in-Chief. She has been quoted as describing Frederic as "the culmination of all the best parts of the magazines I’ve been a part of — House Beautiful, Elle Decor, Domino and Veranda."

== Author ==
Caponigro is author or co-author of a number of books about design, including Domino: The Book of Decorating; The Authentics; S is for Style, Decorate Like a Decorator, Frederic:The Last Word in Chic, and Glorious Gardens.

== Personal style ==
Caponigro’s style choices have been an area of interest explored in many publications. Her homes have been featured in House Beautiful, Domino, Elle Décor,Veranda, Frederic, and Homes & Gardens. When asked by The Wall Street Journal about her all-time favorite car she described a "red 1964 Volvo 122S that I bought on eBay in 2000…If you turned the wheel too hard, the horn went off. But the car made everyone smile."

== Personal life ==
Caponigro lives in the Fieldston section of the Bronx with her husband, the publishing executive David Steinberger, with whom she has two children.
