= WSJ Magazine =

Luxury news and lifestyle magazine

- April 2014 issue, featuring Scarlett Johansson
- Editor in Chief: Sarah Ball (in 2023)
- Categories: Lifestyle magazine
- Frequency: 8 issues per year
- Publisher: Omblyne Pelier
- First issue: Fall 2008
- Company: Dow Jones & Company
- Country: United States
- Language: English
- Website: www.wsj.com/news/style-entertainment

WSJ Magazine (styled on the cover art as WSJ., in upright characters with a dot at the end) is a luxury glossy news and lifestyle monthly magazine published by The Wall Street Journal. It features luxury consumer products advertisements and is distributed to subscribers in large United States markets. Its coverage spans art, fashion, entertainment, design, food, architecture, travel and more. Kristina O'Neill was Editor in Chief from October 2012 to 2023. Sarah Ball, previously Style News Editor, became Editor in Chief in June 2023. Launched as a quarterly in 2008, the magazine grew to 12 issues a year for 2014. It was originally intended to be a monthly magazine named Pursuits.

The magazine is distributed within the U.S. Weekend Edition of The Wall Street Journal newspaper (paid print circulation for the Weekend edition is approximately 2.2 million), and is available on WSJ.com. Each issue is also available throughout the month in The Wall Street Journal's iPad app. It was also inserted with the Europe and Asia editions until those were discontinued in 2017.

With its tagline "The Luxury of Choice", the magazine began operations with an advertising business model that allowed for free delivery to select readers. It followed a trend of contemporaneous new luxury magazines many of which were also delivered as part of free subscriptions that supplemented other subscriptions or memberships. Since it was leveraging a high-end subset of The Wall Street Journal with favorable demographics, many expected the magazine to be successful.

== Initial release ==
Fall 2008 WSJ Magazine debut cover

The magazine was originally sent as an insert with September 6, 2008, weekend home delivery in the seventeen largest United States The Wall Street Journal subscription markets as well as the September 5 editions of The Wall Street Journal Europe and The Wall Street Journal Asia. By selecting these markets, it began with a readership of 960,000 (800,000 domestic). The magazine is also available with newsstand purchases of the newspaper in the selected domestic markets, and its content is available for free online at www.wsj.com. This readership has greater wealth (average household assets of US$2.9 million), higher income ($265,000 per-household income), and takes more than twice as many international leisure trips than the readership of the newspaper. The readership of the newspaper spent more on women's apparel than the readers of Vogue and more on leisure travel than the readers of Travel & Leisure. The launch press release was sent out in English, French, German, Italian, Japanese, Simplified Chinese, and Traditional Chinese. The September 6 debut had been announced about a year earlier.

The magazine was officially unveiled at the Pierpont Morgan Library on September 3, 2008. The unveiling was led by Ellen Asmodeo-Giglio, its publisher; Michael Rooney, Dow Jones chief revenue officer; Tina Gaudoin, WSJ Magazine editor in chief (and former launch editor of The Times of London's quarterly magazine Luxx); and Robert J. Thomson, managing editor of The Wall Street Journal. It has been compared to How To Spend It, the weekend magazine of the Financial Times, T magazine, a New York Times offshoot, Style & Design, a spinoff of Time, and Departures, a magazine distributed for free to American Express platinum and black cardholders. Gaudoin had also previously worked for Tatler, Harper's Bazaar and Vogue and helped to launch the women's magazine Frank.

== Strategy ==
In 2008, luxury magazines had become the new wave of print media. These aforementioned similar magazines have generally succeeded at both giving free luxury magazine subscriptions to a selected elite audience and hoping that they would read them so that the magazine could sell advertising. This magazine is considered to be a similar bet on the viability for the luxury advertising revenues market. Nearly half of the advertiser bought globally in the United States, Europe and Asia and many advertisers committed to advertising deals for all of next year. Some advertisers committed for two years.

The Wall Street Journal launched its weekend newspaper edition, which its publisher, Dow Jones & Company, described as the first and only Saturday morning national weekend newspaper, on September 17, 2005. When the weekend newspaper was launched, it had the highest circulation of any national newspaper published on Saturday. Prior to the launch of the weekend edition, The Wall Street Journal had commonly only been delivered to business addresses. With the home delivery aspect of the weekend edition, the possibility of supplemental weekend luxury magazine arose. The original name Pursuits had been widely publicized as a section of the newly launched weekend edition of the magazine.

== Expanded launch ==
In December 2009, WSJ Magazine announced plans to expand domestic circulation beyond the 17 largest domestic markets to the entire domestic subscription base, which nearly doubled its domestic circulation from 800,000 to 1.5 million. In addition the frequency of distribution was expanded from 4 to 6 times per year. In order to increase the frequency a May and an October edition were added to the March, June, September and December 2010 distribution schedule. At the time of the expansion, the magazine claimed its first fifteen months of its first six issues had been a success during which the magazine attracted 64 new subscribers to the Journal's franchise. Deborah Needleman replaced Tina Gaudoin in 2010. After Needleman left for T in 2012, she was replaced by Kristina O'Neill. In 2012, 2013 and 2014, the magazine increased its publication frequency to 10, 11 and 12 times per year, respectively. When Pursuits was initially marketed, the plan was for it to be a monthly magazine.

== Design and layout ==
The magazine is oversized to be as large as would fit within the fold of The Wall Street Journal. Its specs are 9.875 by 11.5 inches (25.1 by 29.2 cm) trim size and a 50-50 ad-to-edit ratio on a 60-pound (27 kg) paper stock. The premiere issue had 104 pages in the U.S. and 80 pages in the Europe and Asia editions. It included 51 advertisers of which 19 are new to The Wall Street Journal franchise. The initial cover featured Diana Dondoe in a dress fabricated from The Wall Street Journal newsprint design, which the New York Observer feels is a tip of the hat to a controversy noted in The New York Times about a poverty chic photo spread in the India edition of the August 2008 Vogue.

== Critical review ==
The November 2013 cover featuring Gisele Bundchen and Daft Punk won the Clio Award for top magazine cover of the year.

Some media experts consider that pursuit of luxury retail advertising an effective strategy, but whether the magazine becomes a success is an open issue. Immediate speculation commented on the likelihood for success given the demographics of the initial subscription base. Others ascribed their great expectations to the brand. Some skeptics claim that since Journal readers are financial information seekers giving them a free magazine of luxury ads may be a waste of time. Others note the magazine's launch despite a market with declining advertising and a world economy suffering from the 2008 financial crisis. Some advertisers expressed appreciation for an opportunity to present to The Wall Street Journal's readers in a different format.

The content is slightly less focussed on consumption than How To Spend It. Gaudoin stated her intention was to make a publication that was less about how to spend it and more about "how to live it." She also intends to differentiate her magazine via wit and irreverence in order to make WSJ. less urban and less gritty" than T. The magazine claims to have planned to feature Sarah Palin in its inaugural issue even before she became John McCain's running mate in the 2008 United States presidential election.

In 2013, Adweek named WSJ Magazine the "Hottest Lifestyle Magazine of the Year" in its annual Hot List. The November 2013 cover featuring Gisele Bundchen and Daft Punk won the Clio Award for Top Magazine cover of the year.
