= David Steinberger =

American business executive

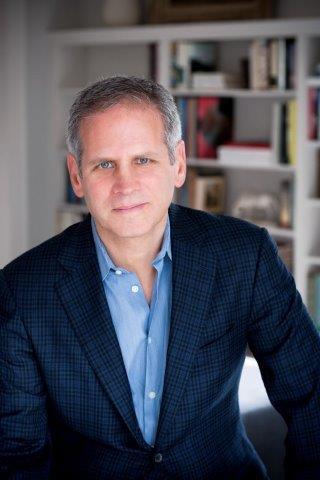
- Born: New York, United States
- Education: Columbia University; Wharton School
- Occupations: Businessman and publishing executive
- Employer(s): National Book Foundation; Open Road Integrated Media Inc.
- Spouse: Dara Caponigro

David Steinberger is an American businessman, publishing executive, podcaster, current Chairman of the National Book Foundation, and Executive Chairman of Open Road Integrated Media Inc. His career has involved the acquisition, management and sale of a number of publishers and publishing-related companies as well as the application of digital technologies to publishing companies. He was CEO of Arcadia Publishing and CEO of the Perseus Books Group, following leadership roles at HarperCollins. In January 2021, Steinberger announced a succession plan at Arcadia, handing over day-to-day management to a successor and moving to Arcadia's board of directors.

In December 2021, he led an investor group in the acquisition of Open Road Integrated Media inc., which utilizes data science technology to publish and market books, with Steinberger being named Executive Chairman, along with the role of CEO added in January 2022.

== Early life and education ==
Steinberger was born in New York, United States, attended High School in Tenafly, New Jersey. He graduated from Columbia University's School of Engineering and earned an MBA from the Wharton School.

== Early career ==
Steinberger's career began in New York City government where he rose to become Deputy Transportation Commissioner for Bridges. According to The New York Times, Steinberger's willingness to speak openly about public safety concerns contributed to his departure from the position in 1991. After City Government, he joined management consultancy Booz Allen Hamilton. Steinberger wrote an opinion piece, published in The New York Times, about how to manage New York City government, entitled "Governing New York: Simplify, Simplify".

== Publishing career ==
In 1996, Steinberger left Booz Allen Hamilton to join the publishing industry as President of the Adult Trade Group at HarperCollins Publishers, a Division of NewsCorp. He became CEO of Perseus Books Group in 2004. After Steinberger completed a series of acquisitions, Perseus Books was named Publisher of the Year in 2007 by Publishers Weekly, which described the company as "arguably the most important independent publishing company in the nation". Perseus Books launched digital initiatives that The New York Times described as providing "hundreds of small publishers easier access to digital book technology" Titles published by Perseus included Friday Night Lights by Buzz Bissinger, as well as books by chess champion Garry Kasparov, Nobel Physics Prize-winner Richard Feynman, and Nobel Peace Prize winner Leymah Gbowee. Steinberger sold Perseus Books in 2016 in two simultaneous transactions, to Hachette Books Group and Ingram Content Group, after an earlier attempt at an exit transaction fell through.

In 2018, Steinberger and lead investor Michael Lynton, chairman of Snap Inc., assembled an investor group to acquire independent publishing businesses, starting with Arcadia Publishing, where Steinberger became CEO. The investor group includes Len Blavatnik, Tony Ressler and Walter Isaacson. Arcadia, noted for its unique approach to publishing hyper-local titles subsequently acquired Pelican Publishing, Wildsam and River Road Press. In 2021, Steinberger announced a leadership succession plan at Arcadia, turning over day-to-day management to a successor and moving to Arcadia's board of directors.

In December 2021, he led an investor group in the acquisition of Open Road Integrated Media Inc., which utilizes data science technology to publish and market books, with Steinberger being named Executive Chairman, along with the role of CEO added in January 2022.

In May 2023, Open Road launched Re-Discovery Lit, an imprint to publish books that had gone out of print or otherwise been reverted by publishers back to authors. According to The New York Times, Re-Discovery Lit utilizes Open Road's "machine learning technology" to find readers for these republished works, which include books by authors such as Barbara Delinsky and Roger Angell.

In July 2024, Open Road launched the Open Book podcast, offering a “behind the scenes look at the world of books and publishing,” with Steinberger in conversation with industry leaders. Featured guests have included Grove Atlantic CEO Morgan Entrekin, former Macmillan CEO John Sargent, journalist and nonfiction pioneer Ted Conover, and former Penguin Random House leader Madeline Macintosh.

Steinberger is chairman of the National Book Foundation, presenter of the National Book Awards. During his tenure, the National Book Foundation in 2016 appointed Lisa Lucas as executive director, the first Black person and the first woman in that role and launched Book Rich Environments, described by the LA Times as "turning book deserts into literary oases." Steinberger has also been a board member of the Fund for the City of New York .

== Personal life ==
Steinberger is married to Dara Caponigro, the creative director at F. Schumacher & Co., and former Editor-in-Chief at Veranda, Decoration Director at House Beautiful and Style Director at Domino.
