= Cornelia and Michael Bessie Books =

Cornelia and Michael Bessie Books was an imprint at:

- Harper & Row (1981-1991)
- Pantheon Books (1991-1999)
- Perseus Books Group (1999-2008)
