= Shelter magazine =

Periodical publication type

A shelter magazine is a periodical publication with an editorial focus on interior design, architecture, home furnishings, and/or gardening.

The term is most often used in the U.S. magazine publishing trade. The earliest example of this "chiefly N[orth] Amer[ican]" meaning recorded by the Oxford English Dictionary is from a New York Times article published on July 3, 1946, in reference to Your Own Home, a "shelter magazine devoted to low-cost housing", which was reported to have gained a new advertising manager.

== Examples of US shelter magazines ==
- Architectural Digest
- Better Homes and Gardens
- Country Life in America (1901–1942)
- Country Living
- The Craftsman
- Desert Magazine
- Domino
- Dwell
- Elle Decor
- House Beautiful
- House Method
- House & Garden
- Lonny
- Martha Stewart Living
- Metropolitan Home
- Midwest Living
- Southern Living
- Sunset
- This Old House
- Traditional Home
- Veranda

Shelter Magazine is also the title of a trade magazine for builders in the U.S.
