= Dominique Browning =

American writer and editor

Dominique Browning is an American climate activist, writer, and editor who also co-founded environmental nonprofit Moms Clean Air Force, a special project of the Environmental Defense Fund. From 1995 to 2007 she was the editor-in-chief of the House & Garden, a shelter magazine published by Conde Nast. Prior to House & Garden she worked at Savvy, American Photographer, Esquire, Newsweek, and Mirabella. As the editor-in-chief of the re-launched House & Garden, she said she introduced global environment issues to the magazine, and sought to search for the more meaningful ideals behind the consumerism of Condé Nast publications.

== Life ==
Browning graduated from Wesleyan University in 1977 with a major in philosophy, literature, and history, and is a classically trained pianist. She is the founder of Moms Clean Air Force, an environmental protection organization dedicated to improving air quality standards, maintains a personal blog called 'Slow Love Life', and her writing is regularly featured in The New York Times and Time. She currently contributes to multiple newspapers and magazines, and has a monthly column on the website of the Environmental Defense Fund.

== Writing ==
Browning has authored the following books:

- Around the House and In the Garden: a Memoir of Heartbreak, Healing, and Home Improvement
- Paths of Desire: the Passion of a Suburban Gardener
- Slow Love: How I Lost my Job, Put on My Pajamas, and Found Happiness (released May 9, 2010)

Browning's books deal with her personal life. She was married to Nicholas Lemann, with whom she has two sons, Alexander and Theodore. Her most recent book, Slow Love, recounts her post-divorce relationship with "Stroller", the pseudonym of the legally separated man with whom she had a seven-year relationship, and who repeatedly asked her why it mattered that he was married.

Browning has also written books under the House & Garden brand:

- The House & Garden Book of Style
- The Well-Lived Life
- Gardens of Paradise
- House of Worship

== Environmental Activities ==
Browning co-founded Moms Clean Air Force in 2011 with a focus on climate change. The national organization now has 1.5 million members and more than one dozen state chapters She was honored in 2016 with The Rachel Carson Award presented by The National Audubon Society.
