= Belt Magazine =

News organization covering the American Midwest

Belt
- Editor: Ed Simon
- Categories: Cultural magazine
- Format: Online
- Publisher: Belt Media Collaborative
- Founder: Anne Trubek
- Founded: 2013
- Country: United States
- Based in: Cleveland, Ohio
- Language: English
- Website: www.beltmag.com

Belt Magazine is a digital nonprofit news organization that covers the Rust Belt and the American Midwest. It was founded in Cleveland, Ohio, in 2013 by Anne Trubek, and is published by the Belt Media Collaborative. According to the magazine's website, Belt is "dedicated to publishing thoughtful, nuanced writing about the past, present, and future of the region." The magazine has received praise for its coverage of the Rust Belt from several media outlets. American Prospect described Belt in 2014 as "the nation's new literary darling," praising the magazine's coverage of the industrial Midwest. The magazine's coverage of the 2016 Republican National Convention was reprinted in The Atlantic. The similarly named Belt Publishing, which publishes book-length works on the Rust Belt, shares historical origins with the magazine and many of the same writers have published with both, but the entities are legally separate and distinct.
