= Kalon Studios =

Contemporary design studi

- Industry: Design studio
- Founded: 2007
- Founder: Michaele Simmering; Johannes Pauwen
- Headquarters: California, United States

Kalon Studios is a contemporary design studio based in Los Angeles, California. It was founded in 2007 by Michaele Simmering and Johannes Pauwen.

== Awards and recognitions ==
- 2026: Sunset magazine's Western Home Awards, Best Locally Made Furniture
- 2025: Architizer A+, Popular Choice Winner in Residential Furniture (for the Element Bed)
- 2024: Domino magazine's Good Design Award, Material Mix Master (for the Element Bed)
- 2024: Wallpaper magazine's USA 400: Guide to Creative America (Michaele Simmering and Johannes Pauwen)
- 2024: Azure magazine's AZ Awards, Winner in Furniture Systems and Collections (for Material Studies – Rugosa)
- 2014: Martha Stewart's American Made Award for Design
- 2009: TIME magazine's The Green Design 100 (for IoLine crib)
