= Freegard =

Freegard is a surname. Notable people with the surname include:

- Bradley Freegard (born 1983), Welsh actor
- Siobhan Freegard (born 1967), English entrepreneur and parenting commentator

== See also ==
- Robert Hendy-Freegard (born 1971), British conman
- Freegard (film), a British film about Robert Hendy-Freegard
