= Netmums =

British parenting website

- Website type: Parenting
- Available in: English
- Owner: aufeminin
- Website: www.netmums.com
- Registration: Optional
- Launched: May 2000

Netmums is a website for parents in the United Kingdom, established in 2000. It operates as a network of local sites, and offers information to both mothers and fathers about parenting. The Coffee House web forum launched in 2004 for mothers to chat, make friends and exchange advice online. As of 2012 the site included over 150 local websites, 500 national meet-up groups for mothers and 1,500 bloggers in its network.

However, in September 2026, the Netmums editorial team posted a message on the forum chat rules page, stating that the Netmums Coffeehouse forum is now closed, and is only accessible in read-only mode, due to no longer having a moderating team.

== History ==
Netmums was founded by Siobhan Freegard, Cathy Court and Sally Russell who met at playgroup in Harrow, north west London in 2000.

Freegard was born in Bristol and started her career as a marketer for hospitality provider Keith Prowse. She has written for The Guardian newspaper, and has appeared on the panel television shows Loose Women and This Morning. Co-founders Court and Russell worked in food technology and environmental sciences respectively.

Netmums started off as a single local site, then gradually grew to cover other local areas, all of which were originally maintained by volunteer site editors using Adobe Contribute and Adobe Dreamweaver web editing software.

In 2009 the website was included in The Independent newspaper's ‘Top 50 Websites and Blogs for Parents’, and the business was estimated to be worth £50 million.

Cathy Ranson was editor-in-chief from 2010 until she left in March 2015, replaced by Annie O'Leary.

By 2011, the number of registered members of the website reached 1 million. and shortly after this, the three co-founders sold their company to European group aufeminin, originally retaining control over the Netmums brand, but later leaving the site to pursue other work.

In March 2012, Netmums and marketing data company Cint created a panel of 4,000 participants to gain market insight on mothers with babies.

In September 2014 Rimi Atwal, formerly of Bauer Media Group, was appointed managing director.

In the 2014 New Year Honours Netmums founders Freegard, Court and Russell received OBEs from the Queen for Services to Families.

In 2013, Netmums announced advertising sign-ups with Stiefel Laboratories' Oilatum and Aquafresh Kids, as they revealed a 46% increase occurred on ad spend on the site from April 2012 to April 2013.

In 2016, Netmums made a post-tax profit of £1,518,962 on a turnover of £5,064,760 (down 33% from 2015).

== Content ==
Netmums lists crafts and activities for families in the school holidays and weekends. Birthday party ideas for children are offered, including planning, making invitations, party themes, recipe and food ideas, and details of local caterers, venues, entertainers and cake makers.

The pregnancy section contains support, advice and tips, and listings of local hospitals, birth centres and pregnancy classes in each area. Members can also subscribe to a weekly pregnancy email and a short email antenatal course, as well as monthly emails with support and advice for parents of children under the age of one. It covers sleep support, baby development, health and support for parents, plus discussions with health professionals.

Netmums offers support and advice for mothers with postnatal depression, with lists of local support groups, information and live support from parents in its Coffeehouse forum. There is also childcare information for mothers going back to work after having a baby. This includes listings for childminders, nurseries and other services.

In 2008, Netmums launched a Parent Supporters service on the Coffee House forum. The social support element of the site later received a grant from the UK Department for Children, Schools and Families to support online counsellors and health visitors. Netmums subsequently expanded the Parent Supporter scheme further, though the government funding was later gradually reduced and then finally withdrawn.

== Campaigns ==
In 2009, Netmums called publicly on the UK government and primary care trusts to take account of the concerns of parents, and the organisations that represent their needs and views, and to reverse this decline.

In 2010 Netmums conducted an online survey of 5,900 mothers asking which issues mattered most to them, and which were likely to affect their voting decisions in the 2010 general election.

In 2011 the website helped local parent groups campaigning to preventing closures of 250 children's centres in the UK.

Netmums endorsed the "Energy Bill Revolution" campaign in 2012 to support reduction of energy waste and increased energy efficiency in the home, calling on the UK government to fund energy efficiency programme with the aim to bring 9 out of 10 homes out of fuel poverty. In the same year Netmums conducted a social survey which concluded that one in seven women describes themselves as feminist

Netmums campaigned for improvements in maternity services for over two years. This included demands for better support for postnatal depression and depression during pregnancy. Netmums also conducted studies looking at different aspects of postnatal depression and anxiety.

Over a period of three years, Netmums conducted three studies on different aspects of postnatal depression and anxiety.

In June 2014 the Family and Childcare Trust and Netmums launched a programme of activity looking into issues affecting families in the UK. This included how family friendly the UK was as a nation, holiday childcare, flexible working, parental leave and childcare in general.

== Books ==
Netmums has published nine books:

- Feeding Kids (2007), ISBN 978-0755316045
- How to Be a Happy Mum: The Netmums Guide to Stress-free Family Life (2007), ISBN 978-0755316069
- Toddling to Ten: Your common parenting problems solved (2008), ISBN 978-0755316076
- Your Pregnancy: The Netmums Guide to Having a Baby (2009), ISBN 978-0755318001
- Baby's First Year: The Netmums Guide to Being a New Mum (2009), ISBN 978-0755318018
- Baby Sleep Solutions (2010), ISBN 978-0755361014
- Getting Ready to Start School (2010), ISBN 978-0755361021
- You and Your Tween (2011), ISBN 978-0755361090
- The Ultimate Baby & Toddler Q&A: Your 50 Most Common Questions Answered (2012), ISBN 978-0755361106
