= Thomas O'Brien (interior designer) =

American interior and furnishings designer (born 1961)

- Born: 1961 (age 64–65)
- Education: Cooper Union
- Occupation: Interior designer
- Website: aerostudios.com

Thomas O'Brien (born 1961) is an American interior and home furnishings designer. His design firm, Aero Studios, and home store, Aero Ltd., are both based in New York City's SoHo neighborhood.

== Career ==
=== Early career ===
O'Brien is a graduate of Cooper Union in New York City, where he studied photography, art and design. Following his degree, he worked briefly at Details magazine, before beginning his career at Polo Ralph Lauren. He worked on the styling and design of the Polo Ralph Lauren flagship store, the former Rhinelander Mansion, on Madison Avenue in Manhattan. He then assisted on the interior design of Ralph Lauren's private country home in Bedford, New York.

=== Aero Studios and store ===
O'Brien established his design firm Aero Studios and its adjoining Aero store in 1992 with fellow Polo alumnus William Sofield. Sofield left Aero in 1995 and O'Brien took sole ownership of the company. The Aero store celebrated its twentieth anniversary in 2012 and was commemorated in O'Brien’s 2013 book, Aero: Beginning to Now.

== Style and accolades ==
O'Brien is often cited for his style of "warm modernism" and his approach of combining vintage, modern, and traditional influences in both his interiors and his product designs. He is regularly named to editorial top designer lists such as the Architectural Digest AD100, and his work is frequently featured in publications such as "Elle Decor", House Beautiful, Architectural Digest, The New York Times, and Veranda.

== Partnerships ==
O'Brien is a prolific product designer who has developed a portfolio of high-end home furnishings with a number of American heritage brands. He has designed bath plumbing for Waterworks; furniture for Hickory Chair and Century Furniture; lighting for Visual Comfort; textiles for Lee Jofa, owned by Kravet; rugs for Safavieh; and tableware and accessories for silversmith manufacturer Reed & Barton. He also produces luxury accessories, leather goods, and bedding for his own Aero brand. In 2000, he launched the largest-ever designer collection of furniture, lighting, and soft home furnishings with retailer Target. Through Aero Studios, O'Brien focuses on the design of private residences as well store development for retail brands. He has designed boutiques for Donna Karan and Emporio Armani, and subsequently collaborated with Armani on the interior design of his Manhattan apartment. In addition, O'Brien has collaborated with Williams-Sonoma, Inc., for whom he designed store concepts for West Elm and Pottery Barn.

In 2013, O'Brien partnered with the Rudin real estate family to create the interior designs for the ten-building campus of Greenwich Lane in Manhattan's Greenwich Village neighborhood. The luxury residential complex was noted for repurposing the historic site of the former St. Vincent's Hospital.

== Publications ==
- American Modern (with Lisa Light). New York: Abrams, 2010. ISBN 978-0-8109-8478-3
- Aero: Beginning to Now (with Lisa Light). New York: Abrams, 2013. ISBN 978-0-8478-3070-1
