= Aufeminin =

French website

- Website type: Web portal
- Available in: French
- Owner: TF1 (78.43%)
- CEO: Marie-Laure Sauty de Chalon,
- Key people: Marie-Laure Sauty de Chalon, Chief Executive Officer; Agnès Alazard, Sales Director; Christophe Decker, Technology and Innovation Director; Patrick Caetano, Administrative and Finance Director; Cyrille Geffray, Smart AdServer Director; Delphine Groll, Communications Director
- Industry: Media, internet, digital, mobile, social networks, marketing
- Revenue: 87,2M€ (2014) +45% (current scope), +16% (constant scope)
- Employees: 455 (on the 31/12/2014)
- Website: aufeminin.com
- Launched: 1999 (27 years ago)

Aufeminin is a digital media group based in Paris, France, founded in 1999. It is 78.43% owned by the TF1 (Télévision Française 1 S.A) and is publicly traded by Euronext Paris in compartment B. (MNEMO : FEM).

The group operates in 21 countries, publishing editorial and community-based content for women, including brands such as Netmums. In 2011, aufeminin launched Womenology, a research group on marketing to women.

In 2015 the group acquired US-based media group Livingly Media, including the sites Zimbio and Lonny. In June 2015, the group achieved close to 132 million unique worldwide visitors per month, and more than 7 million members on their social networks (Facebook, Twitter, Google+, YouTube, Instagram and Pinterest).

== History and operations ==
In 1999, Anne-Sophie Pastel, Marc-Antoine Dubanton and Cyril Vermeulen created the website aufeminin.com. In July 2000, the company became publicly traded and launched Smart Adserver, an independent ad serving software. In 2006, aufeminin.com bought the French cooking website, Marmiton.org. On 26 June 2007, the founder and her two partners sold the company to Germany's Axel Springer Group, one of the leading media organisations in Europe, with headquarters in Berlin. In 2008, aufeminin.com acquired Onmeda, Germany's N°1 health site Since 1 June 2010, Marie-Laure Sauty de Chalon has directed the aufeminin group as CEO, succeeding Bertrand Stephann. In 2011, the group purchased Netmums, the N°1 parenting site in the UK, followed by EtoileCasting in 2012, and also acquired 60% of My Little Paris in 2013.

In 2014, aufeminin removed the ".com" from its name and logo, both on its website and on other media (mobile, tablet, video, social networks, print) as well as in areas of brand publishing, e-commerce and events (competitions, exhibitions, training).

In February 2015, the group announced its acquisition of the Livingly Media company, one of the top 25 digital editors of lifestyle content in the US, including the sites Zimbio and Lonny.

On April 21, 2015 the aufeminin group announced the sale of its adtech subsidiary Smart Adserver to private equity firm Cathay Capital.

On 12 December 2017, Axel Springer signs option agreement for the sale of its stake in aufeminin group to TF1 Télévision Française 1 S.A

== Brands and media ==
The group holds brands for women in France and abroad:

- Beautiful Box: Monthly beauty box launched in 2016 on France, Italy and Spain. On 2017, aufeminin shut it down in Italy and Spain without a release.
- aufeminin: the world leader of editorial and community-based content for women, present on all platforms (websites, mobile, tablet, TV, print) in 21 countries (France, Germany, Austria, Switzerland, UK, Belgium, Netherlands, Spain, Italy, Poland, Algeria, Morocco, Tunisia, Canada, US, Brazil, Mexico, Argentina, Colombia, Peru, Chile).
- Bildderfrau: a website from the N°1 German women's magazine, Bild der Frau created in 2010
- EtoileCasting: a casting site acquired in August 2012
- Happy Happening, a social networking event for women, created in collaboration with Aude de Thuin, president of the ADT lab. Launched in 2014, this resulted in an aufeminin meeting event ("Les Rencontres aufeminin.com"), organised in 2013.
- Joyce: a site for luxury goods designers.
- Marmiton: cooking and recipe site in France, acquired in 2006. With over 60 000 recipes and comments proposed by internet users. Since November 2010, Marmiton has also been available in print with the bimonthly Marmiton Magazine, the 2nd most read cooking magazine in France. In December 2014, Marmiton expanded to Italy with Tutto Gusto.
- Merci Alfred: fashion and offers designed for men, aufeminin acquired 60% in November 2013.
- My Little Paris: fashion and offers, aufeminin acquired 60% in November 2013. My Little Paris publishes newsletters with a community of 1.5 million readers. Little surprise boxes are also distributed to more than 80,000 subscribers.
- Netmums: UK parenting site, acquired in August 2011.
- Onmeda: health site in Germany, acquired in June 2008. Onmeda was also launched in Spain in May 2012. The French health expert media Santé AZ became Onmeda.fr in April 2015.
- Teemix: a site for teens.

== Events ==
The aufeminin group organises events, including:

- The Literary Prize (aufeminin)
- The Marmiton Day (food & cooking day by Marmiton)
- Les Impertinentes, prizing female humour (EtoileCasting)
- Happy Happening; the first event took place from 14 to 16 November 2014 at the Carreau du Temple, in partnership with the ADT lab group. Happy Happening formed an idea lab where training, conferences and workshops were offered to women. Almost 8,000 women attended. The event resulted in the launch of the event "Les Rencontres aufeminin.com", organised in 2013. A second event was planned for November 2015 at the Carreau du Temple in Paris.
