= Jane Friedman =

American businesswoman

- Born: Jane Lippman
- Citizenship: United States
- Education: B.A. New York University
- Known for: Co-Founder of Open Road Integrated Media; President and CEO of HarperCollins
- Parent(s): Ruth and Bert Lippman

Jane Friedman is the Co-Founder of Open Road Integrated Media, which sells and markets ebooks. She was the President and Chief Executive Officer of HarperCollins Publishers Worldwide, one of the world's leading English-language publishers, from 1997 to 2008.

Friedman is credited with inventing the author's tour, now a staple of the industry. Friedman founded and became president of the first audio books division of a trade publisher.

== Early life ==
Friedman was born to a Jewish family, the daughter of Ruth and Bert Lippman; her father was a graphic artist and her mother was one of New York's original Miss Subways. After graduating from Hewlett High School, Friedman earned a B.A. degree in English from New York University in 1967.

== Career ==
She was executive vice president of Random House, Inc., executive vice president of the Knopf Publishing Group, publisher of Vintage Books, and founder and president of Random House Audio Publishing. She came to HarperCollins from Random House. Her departure from HarperCollins was reported in The Wall Street Journal and The New York Times on Wednesday, June 5, 2008.

She has served on the board of the Association of American Publishers, Literacy Partners, Yale University Press, and Poets & Writers, Inc. She is also a member of the American advisory committee of the Jerusalem International Book Fair, the advisory committee to the MFA program in creative writing at The New School and is a vice-chair of the entertainment, media and communications division of the UJA Federation of New York.

In 2011, Friedman secured $8 million in funding from investment companies Azure Capital, Golden Seeds and Kohlberg Ventures.

== Personal life ==
Friedman lives in Manhattan and East Hampton, New York.

== Awards ==
Publishers Weekly Person of the Year; The Wall Street Journal's 50 Women to Watch; Fast Company's Fast 50; New York Magazine's The Influentials.
