= Veranda (magazine) =

American lifestyle magazine

- Editor-in-Chief: Steele Thomas Marcoux (editor)
- Former editors: Dara Caponigro, Clint Smith
- Categories: Lifestyle
- Frequency: Bimonthly
- Circulation: 464,357
- Publisher: Hearst Corporation
- Founder: Lisa Newsom and Charles Ross
- Founded: 1987
- Country: United States
- Based in: Birmingham, Alabama
- Language: English
- Website: Veranda
- ISSN: 1040-8150
- OCLC: 18541608

Veranda (stylized in all caps) is an American lifestyle magazine with a focus on the home, and has a circulation of 464,357 copies as of 2020. The magazine is one of the Hearst Corporation's shelter magazine titles, alongside Elle Décor and House Beautiful. The magazine's headquarters was originally in Atlanta, GA, but relocated to Hearst's editorial offices in Manhattan circa 2013, and then to Hearst's editorial offices in Birmingham, Alabama at the end of 2018. With each of these relocations came rounds of layoffs.

== History and profile ==
Founded in 1987 by Lisa Newsom and Charles Ross, the magazine originally focused on decor, gardens, and jewellery coverage. It also covered articles on interior design. The magazine was started by Veranda Publications, Inc., an Atlanta-based company, as a quarterly publication. In 1999 the frequency was switched to bimonthly. In May 2002 the magazine was acquired by Hearst Corporation. Lisa Newsom continued to serve as the editor-in-chief of the magazine after the acquisition.

The content of the magazine was also expanded into luxury travel under the direction of editor-in-chief Dara Caponigro. Caponigro took the helm at Veranda in April 2010, after several editorial positions at domino, House Beautiful, and Elle Décor. In 2010, Jennifer Levene-Bruno replaced original publisher, Sims Bray, who continued as a consultant at Veranda until the end of that year.
