= Moms Clean Air Force =

US environmental organization

- Established: 2011
- Founder: Dominique Browning
- Type: Nonprofit
- Region served: United States
- Members: 1.6 million
- Affiliations: Environmental Defense Fund
- Website: Official website

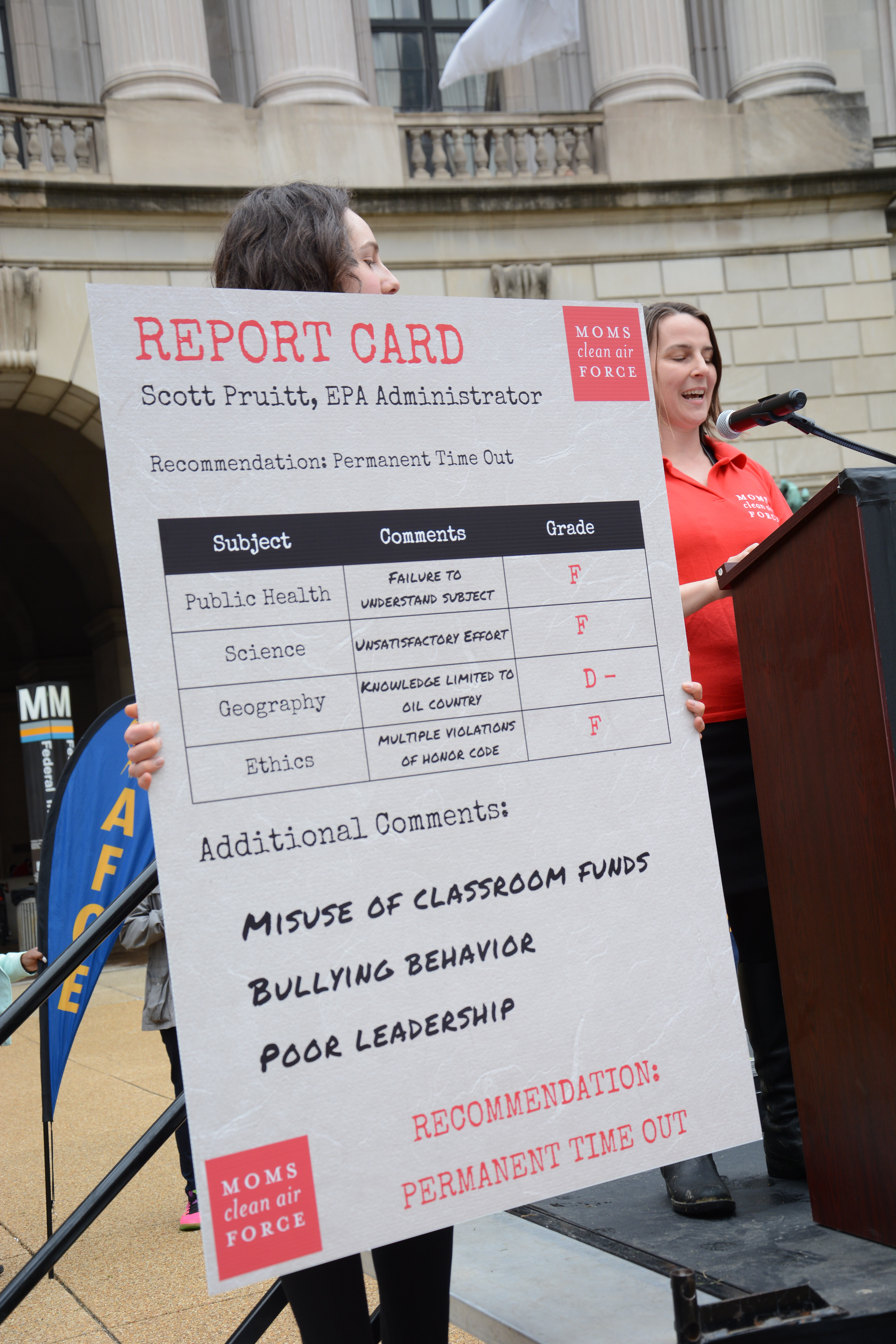
Moms Clean Air Force campaigners demonstrating against Environmental Protection Agency (EPA) administrator Scott Pruitt in April 2018

Moms Clean Air Force is a nonprofit, grassroots environmental advocacy group, based in the United States, which focuses on protecting children from air pollution. It has chapters in 26 states and an estimated 1.6 million members, and is politically neutral or, in its own words, "mom-partisan". It was co-founded in 2011 by Dominique Browning in partnership with Hanne Grantham and Sue Mandel of the Environmental Defense Fund (EDF). It also campaigns on related issues such as toxic chemicals and climate change. Recent campaigns have included calling for the electrification of diesel school buses and supporting President Joe Biden's Build Back Better Plan. Notable supporters of the organization include actors Christina Applegate, Julianne Moore, and Maya Rudolph.

== See also ==
- Mums for Lungs
