= Zane's Law =

British campaign advocating reform of contaminated land legislation

Zane’s Law
- Formation: 2021
- Founders: Kye Gbangbola, Nicole Lawler
- Type: Environmental campaign
- Region served: United Kingdom
- Key people: Kye Gbangbola, Nicole Lawler
- Website: zaneslaw.co.uk

Zane’s Law is a British environmental campaign seeking reform of contaminated land legislation in the United Kingdom. The campaign advocates the introduction of the proposed Clean Land (Human Rights) Bill, which aims to strengthen the identification, inspection, public registration and remediation of contaminated land and historic landfill sites.

The campaign is named after Zane Gbangbola, who died during flooding at his family home in Chertsey, Surrey, in February 2014. It is led by his parents, Kye Gbangbola and Nicole Lawler, who dispute the findings of the 2016 inquest into Zane’s death and have campaigned for changes to contaminated land regulation. The same night that Zane died, his father, Kye, also was paralysed from the waist down.

== Background ==
In January 2014, the area around the Gbangbola family home was flooded when the River Thames burst its banks. On 6 February 2014, Nicole Lawler hired a Honda petrol-powered pump to clear water from the basement of the property, and this was in use on 7 February. At around 03:30 on 8 February, Zane was found to be unresponsive, while both Kye and Nicole fell ill. Zane was declared dead in hospital, Kye was left paralysed from the waist down, while Nicole was hospitalised for only a short time.

A coroner's inquest held in 2016 determined that Zane had died from carbon monoxide poisoning due to the pump, which was operating for an extended period of time inside the property, without adequate ventilation. The coroner stated: "I cannot accept [the parents'] accounts that on February 7 it [the pump] was used for no more than 20 minutes and not after lunchtime... I find it was used for six hours and stopped at 6.30pm, presumably when it ran out of fuel."

The family subsequently established the "Truth About Zane" campaign, disputing the inquest verdict, and instead claiming that hydrogen cyanide released from a nearby historic landfill site was responsible for his death.

The family’s wider policy campaign subsequently developed into Zane’s Law, which seeks legislative reform of contaminated land regulation throughout the United Kingdom.

Kye Gbangbola is a Fellow of the Chartered Institute of Building and has also been raising this campaign as a chartered professional.

== History ==
The campaign was publicly launched during the 2021 United Nations Climate Change Conference (COP26). It calls for greater transparency, mandatory inspection of potentially contaminated land, improved public registers and stronger statutory duties to investigate and remediate contaminated sites.

In July 2026 the UK Government announced a non-statutory inquiry into the death of Zane Gbangbola, chaired by Dr Sandie Okoro OBE.

== Proposed legislation ==
Campaigners describe the proposed legislation as the Clean Land (Human Right) Bill. Among its principal proposals are that the proposed legislation would require publicly accessible registers of contaminated land, create a national register maintained by the Environment Agency, strengthen duties to inspect and remediate contaminated sites and historic landfill sites, and provide funding for local authorities under the "polluter pays" principle.

== Political and institutional support ==
=== Parliament ===
The campaign has been raised in both Houses of Parliament. Baroness Natalie Bennett has promoted contaminated-land reforms associated with Zane’s Law in the House of Lords and chaired the Zane’s Law parliamentary summit in 2025.

=== London ===
On 6 November 2024 the London Assembly unanimously approved a motion supporting Zane’s Law, proposed by Zack Polanski and Zoë Garbett. Following the motion, Mayor of London Sadiq Khan publicly confirmed his support for the campaign in July 2025.

=== Metro mayors ===
In October 2025 Andy Burnham and Steve Rotheram publicly endorsed Zane’s Law.

=== Wales ===
In May 2025 a motion reflecting the principles of Zane’s Law was tabled in the Senedd by Delyth Jewell, Jane Dodds and Peredur Owen Griffiths, with support from Rhys ab Owen.

=== Local authorities ===
Support for Zane’s Law has expanded through a series of motions adopted by local authorities across England.

List of Councils in Support of Zane's Law
Local Authority	Support Date
Lewes District Council	February 2024
Adur District Council	March 2024
Brighton and Hove City Council	March 2024
Stroud District Council	April 2024
Rother District Council	May 2024
Runnymede Borough Council	July 2025
Cheshire West and Chester Council	December 2025
Newham London Borough Council	July 2025
Havering London Borough Council	November 2025
Bolton Council	November 2025
London Borough of Barking and Dagenham	November 2025
London Borough of Hackney	March 2026

In March 2026 North Northamptonshire Council, which was controlled by Reform UK at the time, rejected a motion supporting Zane’s Law by 29 votes to 24, with four abstentions. Following the decision, Kettering Town Council adopted a motion supporting the principles of Zane’s Law and invited town and parish councils across North Northamptonshire to consider similar motions. Corby Town Council and Wellingborough Town Councilsubsequently also adopted a motion supporting the campaign.

=== Trade unions ===
The campaign has received support from the Trades Union Congress and the Fire Brigades Union. UNISON has also been following this campaign.

== See also ==
- Contaminated land
- Environmental Protection Act 1990
- Environment Agency
- Landfill
- Environmental justice
- Corby toxic waste case
- Ella's law
