= Country Life in America =

American shelter magazine

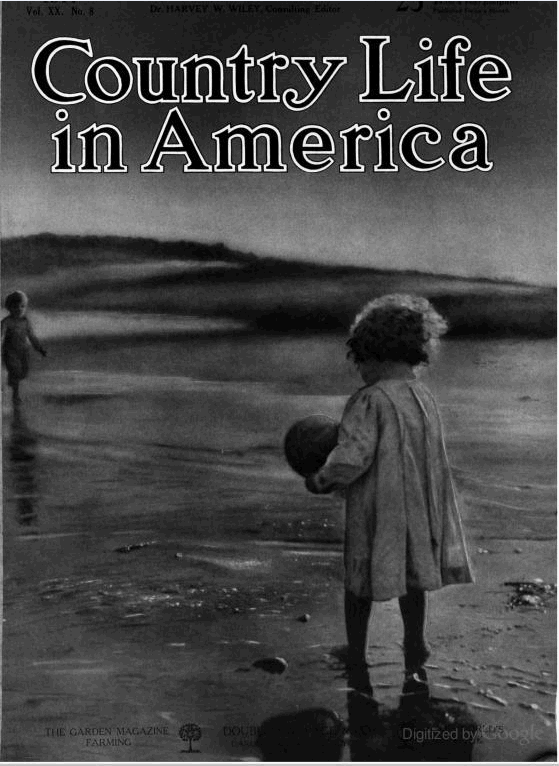
- Cover from 'the good health' issue, vol 8, no 22, 1911.
- Managing Editor: Henry H. Saylor
- Categories: Lifestyle magazines
- Frequency: Monthly
- Publisher: Doubleday, Page & Co.
- First issue: November 1901
- Final issue: 1942
- Country: USA
- Based in: New York City
- Language: English
- OCLC: 4340584

Country Life in America was an American shelter magazine, first published in November 1901 as an illustrated monthly by Doubleday, Page & Company. Henry H. Saylor was the initial managing editor, and Robert M. McBride started his career at this publication.

While its initial readership target was rural dwellers, it soon changed its focus to people looking for ideas on country living. In 1917, the name changed to The New Country Life, then Country Life. The magazine ended production in 1942.
