= F. Schumacher & Co. =

American textile designer and manufacturer

F. Schumacher & Company
- Type: Privately owned
- Industry: Textile design
- Founded: 1889 in New York City, United States
- Founder: Frederic Schumacher
- Headquarters: New York, USA
- Area served: Worldwide
- Key people: Timur Yumusaklar, (CEO) Dara Caponigro, (COO; Creative Director; EIC of Frederic Magazine) Hannah Peters Siegried, (General Counsel, EVP of People & Organization)
- Products: Fabrics, wall coverings, trimmings, finished goods, floor coverings, paint, print media, social & digital platforms
- Brands: Schumacher, Patterson Flynn Martin, Backdrop, Freddie, Frederic
- Owner: Stephen Puschel & Andrew Puschel
- Website: www.schumacher.com

F. Schumacher & Co. is a privately held textile company based in New York City and Fort Mill, South Carolina. Schumacher primarily designs and manufactures fabrics, wall covering, trimming, floor covering, finished goods and paint for the interior design industry in the United States.

Established in 1889 by Frederic Schumacher, F. Schumacher & Co. is a fifth generation business and the only supplier of decorative textiles from the 19th century still privately owned and managed by direct descendants of its founder. Schumacher currently operates under five brands; Schumacher, Patterson Flynn Martin, Backdrop, Freddie and Frederic. The company currently maintains 18 showrooms in several countries.

== History ==
=== Beginnings (1889–1925) ===
Frederic Schumacher came to New York with the French textile company Passavant & Co. In the same year, he opened F. Schumacher & Co. at 22nd Street and Broadway on Manhattan's Ladies' Mile (now the Ladies' Mile Historic District). With the Gilded Age in full swing by 1893, Schumacher became a textile supplier and sold decorative fabrics to new American mansions and hotels, including the Waldorf-Astoria and the Vanderbilt.

In 1895, the company purchased a domestic fabric manufacturing facility, the Waverly Mill in Paterson, New Jersey. The Waverly Mill produced woven fabrics for residences, businesses and public buildings, including a satin lampas that Stanford White designed in 1902 for Theodore Roosevelt’s White House.

=== A modern approach (1925–1945) ===
In 1925, Schumacher took part in the Exposition Internationale des Arts Décoratifs et Industriels Modernes in Paris, an exhibition of Modern Art, a movement which inspired styles such as Art Nouveau and Art Deco. According to Jeffrey Simpson, who wrote in Architectural Digest in 2008, it is most likely that just before 1930 Pierre Pozier, nephew and heir of Frederic Schumacher, brought Poiret into the company as its first fashion luminary. At that time Poiret was asked to create the first designer fabric collection for the company. Poiret came up with simple Modernist shapes for his fabrics inspired by his contemporaries, Cubist painters.

By 1939, during the Great Depression and Second World War, the company contributed to the war effort by producing material for parachutes, life preserves, and other wartime products for the navy and air force. From 1939 until 1946, Schumacher's New Jersey–based mill, Waverly, operated 24 hours a day.

=== Post-war (1945–1970) ===
With rise in suburban communities and the American housewife, Waverly (a division of Schumacher, which was sold in 2007) marketed directly to the department store consumer and began advertising in print media in 1944 with the first slogan "all three," allowing customers to purchase fabric, wallpaper and carpeting in one place. In 1951, a custom-designed Liberty Bell and Liberty Cap were woven at the Schumacher mill for both the United States Senate and the House of Representatives. In 1950, First Lady Bess Truman selected fabric from F. Schumacher & Co. designed by Vera Neumann ) to decorate the White House's third-floor Solarium windows and upholstery.

In 1956, upon learning that many famous generals in history had been honored with a commemorative toile, Mrs. Eisenhower and decorator Elisabeth Draper devised a design from the buildings, trophies, and motifs that symbolized President Eisenhower’s life and career. The pattern was even fashioned into a dress for Mrs. Eisenhower to wear during the president’s successful 1956 reelection campaign.

Schumacher’s Blue Room Lampas was featured in Jackie Kennedy’s famous TV tour of the White House, which aired in 1962.

=== Growth (1970–2021) ===
In 1998, F. Schumacher & Co. acquired Patterson Flynn Martin, which was established in 1943 as a purveyor of fine Wilton and Axminster carpets from Europe, and authentic hand-made reproductions of traditional rug designs from the 16th, 17th and 18th centuries making it the sister company to Schumacher. Presently, it also focuses on making custom rugs for interior designers and architects

In 2021, F Schumacher & Co also went on to acquire Backdrop.

=== Since 2021 ===
F. Schumacher & Co. has five divisions that provide products and inspiration for interior decoration and design:

==== Schumacher ====
Schumacher specializes in fabric, wallcovering, trim, furniture and home accessories. It has a portfolio of over 10,000 products available for sale to interior designers and architects on fschumacher.com as well as in showrooms. The company operates 18 showrooms in the United States: New York, Boston, Washington D.C., Atlanta, Dania, Houston, Dallas, Minneapolis, Chicago, Troy, Los Angeles, Laguna Nigel, and San Francisco.

Since 2021, the company has introduced updated showroom concepts in cities such as Nashville, Charlotte, and Charleston, combining a traditional trade showroom with a public‑facing boutique and event programming. Internationally, Schumacher has expanded its European presence with dedicated showrooms in London, Paris, and Milan.

Schumacher is also sold in 28 countries including Canada, Australia and the UK.

== High-profile clients ==
=== Film industry ===
Set designer Hobe Erwin designed a line for Schumacher that was used to decorate the set for Gone With The Wind (1939). Cecil Beaton, society photographer and fashion designer for stage and screen—My Fair Lady and Gigi—was enlisted as a guest designer for F. Schumacher. In addition, sets for A Bed Time Story (1933), I Love Lucy (1953), The Age of Innocence (1993), Washington Square (1996), Atonement (2007) and others included Schumacher in their designs.

=== Government ===
The company has supplied textiles to the White House, the Chambers of the United States Supreme Court, and the Smithsonian Institution.

=== Public spaces ===
F. Schumacher was involved in the design of the Metropolitan Opera in New York City.
