= Arcadia Publishing =

American publisher of local history books

- Parent company: Lezen
- Founded: 1993
- Country of origin: United States
- Headquarters location: Charleston, South Carolina, U.S.
- Distribution: Self-distributed
- Key people: David Steinberger (CEO)
- Publication types: Books
- Imprints: The History Press; Pelican Publishing Company
- No. of employees: 108
- Official website: arcadiapublishing.com

Arcadia Publishing is an American publisher of neighborhood, local, and regional history of the United States in pictorial form. The company also runs the History Press, which publishes text-driven books on American history and folklore.

== History ==
Arcadia Publishing was founded in Dover, New Hampshire, in 1993 by United Kingdom-based Tempus Publishing, but became independent after being acquired by its CEO in 2004. The corporate office is in Mount Pleasant, South Carolina. It has a catalog of more than 12,000 titles, and it—along with its subsidiary, The History Press—publishes 900 new titles every year.

Its formula for regional publishing is to use local writers or historians to write about their community using 180 to 240 black-and-white photographs with captions and introductory paragraphs in a 128-page book.

The Images of America series is the company's largest product line. Other series include Images of Rail, Images of Sports, Images of Baseball, Black America, Postcard History, Campus History, Corporate History, Legendary Locals, Images of Modern America, and Then & Now.

In May 2017, Arcadia acquired Palmetto Publishing Group, a Charleston-based self-publishing service that had been in business since 2015. In 2018, Arcadia was acquired by Lezen, a new company owned by Lili and Michael Lynton. In March 2019, Walter Isaacson became the editor-at-large and senior adviser for Arcadia Publishing, where his role includes promoting books for the company, editing, developing new strategy, and building partnerships.

In 2010, Arcadia became the first major publisher to print all of their books on Forest Stewardship Council (FSC) paper. All of the publisher's books are also printed and manufactured in South Carolina on American-made paper.

== Imprints ==
- Applewood Books (purchased in 2023).
- Arcadia Children's Books (founded in 2019).
- Belt Publishing (acquired in 2024)
- Commonwealth Editions (acquired in 2021 from Applewood Books).
- The History Press (originally a U.S. subsidiary of United Kingdom-based publisher of the same name; sold to Arcadia in 2014). The History Press specializes in books dealing with "narratives of local heroes, tragic losses, collections of homegrown recipes, historic mysteries, and everything in between." Some of their series include: American Legends (a series focused on local mythology, legends, and mysteries), Forgotten Tales (a line of books that catalogue near-forgotten stories), and Haunted America (paranormal history books that are written by local authors about ghost stories specific to cities across the US).
- Pelican Publishing Company (purchased in 2019). Pelican publishes books focused on Louisiana and Southern culture, cuisine, art, and history.

== Distribution ==
The books are printed in the United States. Arcadia handles its own sales and distribution with the following each accounting for a third of the company's sales:

- Bookstore chains
- Independent bookstores, libraries and museums
- Nontraditional outlets (e.g., historical societies, hardware stores)
