= Mums for Lungs =

British environmental organization

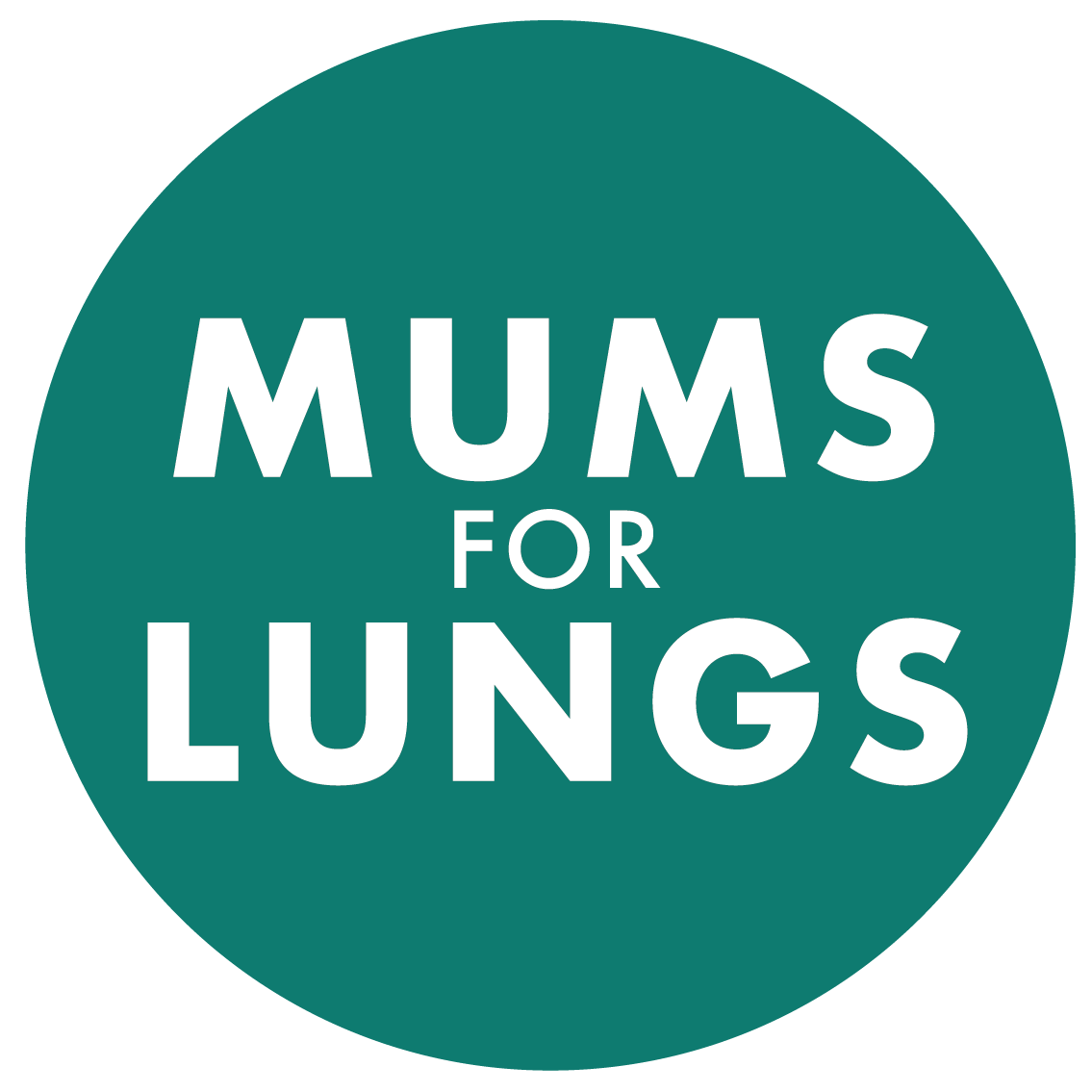
- Logo of Mums for Lungs
- Established: 2017
- Founder: Jemima Hartshorn
- Founded at: London, UK
- Type: Nonprofit
- Purpose: Environmental activism
- Region served: UK
- Website: Official website

Mums for Lungs is a nonprofit, grassroots environmental campaign group, based in the United Kingdom, which raises awareness of the health effects of air pollution, particularly on children.

== History ==
Mums for Lungs was formed in London in 2017 by a small group of parents, including human rights lawyer Jemima Hartshorn. They were inspired to take action partly by their personal experience of living in a traffic-polluted city and partly by the campaigning efforts of Rosamund Kissi-Debrah, a teacher-turned-activist whose daughter's death was attributed to the effects of breathing polluted air. The group quickly expanded from a few like-minded friends, first to multiple campaigns around London and then to a Manchester based group.

In 2021, Mums for Lungs won the Sheila McKechnie Foundation Best Community Campaign Award for its work.

== Campaigns ==
Mums for Lungs campaigns on a range of air pollution issues, including clean air guidelines and targets, the expansion of London's Ultra Low Emission Zone;, clean air zones, pollution from wood burning stoves and diesel engines; the role of pollution in childhood asthma, car-free streets, and cleaner travel to and from schools. Since 2018, one of its major ongoing campaigns has been supporting an initiative called School Streets, which temporarily close roads to motor traffic at school picking-up and dropping-off times to reduce the impact of pollution and improve safety. There are now an estimated 500+ such schemes in London and 200 more outside the capital.

== See also ==
- Air pollution in the United Kingdom
- Moms Clean Air Force
