= T (magazine) =

American magazine

- T: The New York Times Style Magazine (Spring 2014 issue)
- Editor in Chief: Jody Quon (2026–present)
- Former editors: Stefano Tonchi (2004–2010); Sally Singer (2010–2012); Deborah Needleman (2012–2016); Hanya Yanagihara (2017–2026)
- Frequency: 11 times a year
- First issue: August 2004
- Company: The New York Times Company
- Country: United States
- Based in: New York City
- Website: nytimes.com/section/t-magazine
- OCLC: 994775595

Earlier design of the cover of T: The New York Times Style Magazine

T: The New York Times Style Magazine, known simply as T, is a perfect-bound magazine publication of The New York Times newspaper dedicated to fashion, living, beauty, holiday, travel, and design coverage. T is not a supplement of The New York Times Magazine, but a distinct publication with its own staff. It was launched in August 2004, and is distributed with the Sunday edition of the newspaper 11 times a year.

Since December 2007, an international edition has been distributed with the weekend edition of The New York Times International Edition (or International New York Times, formerly the International Herald Tribune). In 2010, its first country-specific edition, T Qatar was launched. T Australia is a separate online and quarterly print magazine produced for the Australian market.

== History ==
T: The New York Times Style Magazine was launched in August 2004. It was published 13 times per year between 2013 and 2016, and since January 2017 has been published 11 times per year.

== People ==
Janet Froelich was creative director until 2009.

In 2013, Brendan Monaghan was announced as the first publisher, whilst Monaghan and Sebastian Tomich were jointly named vice presidents of advertising. Monaghan departed T in 2015 and in March 2016, former Women's Health Associate Publisher, Elizabeth Webbe Lunny joined the magazine as Vice President and Publisher.

=== Editors ===
Stefano Tonchi was editor of T from its launch until 2010. Sally Singer then edited the magazine from 2010 to 2012.. She was replaced by Deborah Needleman, who edited the magazine for four years before leaving T in late November 2016. Under Needleman's leadership, T underwent a redesign and increased its ad pages. The luxury magazine had its ad pages grow by 30 percent in the first three quarters of 2016, compared to the same period in 2012, to 934 pages, according to Business of Fashion. Since the editorial departures, T's advertising business under Lunny has largely been down with steep declines in paging in key 2017 Women's & Men's Spring Fashion issues.

Hanya Yanagihara was the editor-in-chief of T from 2017 to 2026. On July 6, 2026, Jody Quon was announced as the new editor-in-chief.

== Awards ==
The American Society of Magazine Editors' National Magazine Awards, sometimes known as "Ellies," were given to the New York Times Style Magazine and the New York Times Magazine in 2019. Both publications are owned by the same company. In 2021, the New York Times Style Magazine won the National Magazine Award for General Excellence, Service, and Lifestyle.

== International editions ==
In 2010, its first country-specific edition, T Qatar, was launched. It was followed by T China, T Japan, T Singapore, and then T Spain, the first licensed edition in the European market.

- T Australia (since 2021)
- T China (since 2015)
- T Spain (from 2016 to 2020)
- T Japan (since 2015)
- T Qatar (from 2010 to 2021)
- T Singapore (from 2016 to 2021)
