= House & Garden (magazine) =

American shelter magazine

- Cover of the September 2024 issue (UK)
- Editor: Hatta Byng
- Categories: Shelter
- Frequency: Monthly
- Circulation: 120,008 (ABC Jul – Dec 2013 UK); Print and digital editions.
- Publisher: Condé Nast Publications (UK)
- First issue: June 1901
- Website: houseandgarden.co.uk (UK edition)

House & Garden is a shelter magazine published by Condé Nast Publications that focuses on interior design, entertaining, and gardening that began in the US in 1901.

The magazine's original US edition ceased in 1993, and after an unsuccessful relaunch was closed again in 2007. International editions of the magazine are still published in the United Kingdom (first published in 1947) and South Africa. A Greek edition was launched in November 2007.

== History ==
The magazine was launched in 1901 as a journal devoted to architecture. Its founding editors were Herbert C. Wise, Wilson Eyre, and Frank Miles Day, all Philadelphia, Pennsylvania, architects. The magazine became part of Condé Montrose Nast's publishing empire when he bought an interest in it in 1911; he became its sole owner in 1915. Nast transformed it into a magazine about interior design, as part of his trend toward specialized publications aimed at niche markets.

The US magazine was renamed HG with its March 1988 issue, under editor in chief Anna Wintour, formerly of British Vogue. Its new emphasis on mixing fashion and interior decoration in its pages led the revamped magazine to be derided as House & Garment and Vanity Chair by its critics. Wintour became editor in chief of Vogue in 1988; HG ceased publication in 1993.

House & Garden was relaunched in 1995 under editor in chief Dominique Browning; its first issue of its second incarnation was September 1996. Condé Nast Publications announced on 5 November 2007 that the magazine was being closed again, stating that "we no longer believe it is a viable business investment for the company." The magazine's US offices closed on 9 November 2007, and the last US issue was December 2007.

The editors in chief of House & Garden in the United States were:

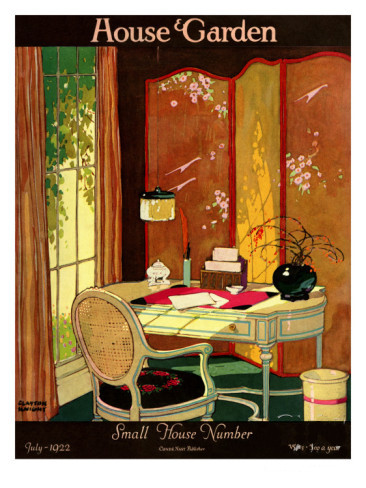
House & Garden in 1922 by Clayton Knight

- Herbert C. Wise (1901–1905)
- Charles Francis Osborne (1905–1909)
- Henry H. Saylor (1909–1913)
- Richardson L. Wright (1914–1946)
- Albert Kornfeld (1946–1955)
- William H. Lowe Jr. (1955–1958)
- Harriet Burket (1958–1969)
- Mary Jane Pool (1969–1981)
- Louis Oliver Gropp (1981–1987)
- Anna Wintour (1987–1988)
- Nancy Novogrod (1988–1993)
- Dominique Browning (1995–2007)

=== UK edition ===
A UK edition was originally planned to be launched in the late 1930s, but was cancelled due to World War II. The magazine was finally published in February 1947, although paper restrictions meant that there were only seven pages in colour and, until 1952, just four editions each year. The founding editor was Anthony Hunt, followed by Michael Middleton, before Robert Harling took over for a 36-year tenure between 1957 and 1993. Harling was succeeded by Sue Crewe, who edited the magazine until September 2014 when she moved to the Conde Nast website House, and was replaced by Hatta Byng.

The success of the magazine owes much to Robert Harling, who was appointed Editor in 1957 by Pat (Iva Patcevitch), the Head of Condé Nast, following his recommendation by close friend Ian Fleming, the author and creator of James Bond.

Harling appointed a staff of 18, which included Leonie Highton, and later John Bridges, and three advisers: Elizabeth David (on food), Loelia, Duchess of Westminster (to discover unknown houses), and Olive Sullivan (on interior design). Harling revitalised House & Garden, and produced a magazine which contrasted the ancient and modern, with colour and simplicity. Besides the magazine, he launched a series of books on the same theme, starting in 1959 with House & Garden Interiors and Colour. Ten more books followed, his last contributions being the House & Garden Book of Romantic Rooms (1985), and House & Garden Book of Classic Rooms (1989); in 1980 with Miles Hadfield he published British Gardeners: a biographical dictionary - this being a reworking of Pioneers in Gardening a book which he had developed with Miles Hadfield and Leonie Highton thirty five years earlier.

The editors in chief of House & Garden in the United Kingdom were:

- Anthony Hunt (1947–?)
- Michael Middleton (?–1957)
- Robert Harling (1957–1993)
- Sue Crewe (1993–2014)
- Hatta Byng (2014–present)

=== South African edition ===
House and Garden South Africa was launched in 1998. The 2013 (self-sourced) print circulation exceeded that of Digital/online. The magazine is bi-lingual published in English and Afrikaans.

== Publications ==
- House & Garden Book of Country Rooms, Leonie Highton, Vendome Press (2002)
- House & Garden Book of Country Gardens, Leonie Highton, Ebury Press (2000)
- House & Garden Book of Vacation Homes & Hideaways, Leonie Highton, Ebury Press (2000)
- House & Garden Book of Kitchens and Dining Rooms, Leonie Highton, Ebury Press (1999)
- House & Garden Book of Country Chic, Leonie Highton, Ebury Press (1997)
- House & Garden Book of Bedrooms & Bathrooms, Leonie Highton, Ebury Press (1995)
- House & Garden Book of Drawing-Rooms and Sitting-Rooms, Robert Harling, Leonie Highton, John Bridges, Conde Nast, London (1991)
- House & Garden Book of Living-Rooms, Leonie Highton, Robert Harling, John Bridges, Vendome Press (1991)
- House & Garden Book of Classic Rooms, Robert Harling, Leonie Highton, John Bridges, Chatto and Windus (1989)
- House & Garden Book of Romantic Rooms, Robert Harling, Leonie Highton, John Bridges, Harper Collins (1985)
- Entertaining with House and garden: 600 recipes for successful menus and parties, Leonie Highton, Treasure (1983)
- British Gardeners. A biographical dictionary, Miles Hadfield, Robert Harling & Leonie Highton, Condé Nast, London (1980)
- Entertaining with House and garden: 600 recipes for successful menus and parties, Leonie Highton, Cathay Books, London (1979)
- House & Garden Book of Home Storage: Guide to Organization and Arrangement, Highton, Leonie, Collins (1975)
- House & Garden guide to interior decoration, Robert Harling, Leonie Highton, Yvonne Jaques, Nigel Kendall (1967)
- House & Garden Interiors and Colour, Robert Harling (1959)
