= Siobhan Freegard =

Siobhan Freegard OBE (born 17 July 1967) founded both Netmums.com, the UK's first social network for mothers and ChannelMum, the UK's first all-female influencer agency.

In 2000 Siobhan founded Netmums,a female-interest website in the UK with a network of 151 local websites and 300 national groups for mums to meet offline, alongside 2,300 parent bloggers and over 8 million unique users each month. Traffic to the site was ahead of Vogue, Cosmopolitan and every other parenting title.

In 2011 Freegard and her co-founders sold Netmums to Axel Springer-owned French women's publisher Aufeminin but she remained as managing director. In March 2014 Freegard estimated that the business was worth £50 million. In September 2014 Freegard stepped down as managing director to start a new content company for mothers, called Channel Mum.

Channel Mum developed the term 'Mumfluencer' after launching the 2015 'Vlogstars' competition. UK TV network ITV took a minority stake in the business at launch.

Channel Mum won a number of coveted awards including the 2019 Campaign for Good Awards (Best Use of Celebrity / Influencer) beating British Airways and the UN,

The agency also won Content Marketer of the Year 2018 Digiday Europe Awards, Best Team in Influencer Marketing and Best Boutique Agency Bronze Winner at the 2021 IMA awards, Best Branded Content Series with Iceland at the 2018 Digiday Europe Awards and Best Branded Content Series plus Content Marketer of the Year at the 2019 Digiday Europe Awards. In 2019 Freegard's agency also won the Best In-House Content Team at the UK Content Awards. Channel Mum was sold to M&C Saatchi Social in 2022.

An expert in Web 3.0, Freegard is currently consulting for a number of leading AI and Metaverse projects.

Freegard was awarded an OBE in the 2013 New Years Honours List for services to families, which was presented to her in March 2014 at Buckingham Palace by Prince William.

She is also the author of the book How to be a Happy Mum, published by Headline. Headline published six other Netmums parenting books under Freegard's guidance.

== Personal life ==
Freegard has spoken publicly about the postnatal depression that she experienced after the birth of her first child, and has campaigned publicly for better support and understanding for mums with postnatal depression.
