= Belt Publishing =

Small American book publishing house

- Founded: 2013; 12 years ago
- Founder: Anne Trubek
- Country of origin: United States
- Headquarters location: Cleveland, Ohio
- Distribution: Publishers Group West
- Publication types: Books
- Owner(s): Independent; (2013–24); Arcadia Publishing; (2024–present)
- Official website: beltpublishing.com

Belt Publishing is an independent press founded in 2013 in Cleveland, Ohio.

Originally a publisher of anthologies about Rust Belt cities, since 2015 Belt has moved into publishing a wider scope of both fiction and nonfiction.

It has been described as "promot[ing] a kind of progressive Rust Belt pride without succumbing to cliché or hipster irony" in the New York Times, and "serv[ing] as a thoughtful foil to national-media characterizations of the region as either hopelessly dystopic or cheerfully rebounding, sticking instead to a knotty middle" in the Chicago Tribune.

In February 2024, it was announced that the press company was acquired by Arcadia Publishing.
