= Lonny (magazine) =

American lifestyle magazine

- Categories: Lifestyle
- Frequency: Monthly
- Format: Online magazine
- Founder: Michelle Adams and Patrick Cline
- Founded: 2009
- First issue: October 2009
- Company: Livingly Media (Recurrent)
- Country: United States
- Based in: Redwood City, California
- Language: English
- Website: www.lonny.com

Lonny is a monthly online magazine focused on lifestyle and home decor. Launched in October 2009, its name is a portmanteau of "London" and "NY", the hometowns of its two founders, designer Michelle Adams and photographer Patrick Cline.

In 2013, a year after Lonny was acquired by Livingly Media, Michelle Adams ended her tenure as editor-in-chief of the magazine. The same year Irene Edwards was appointed executive editor of the magazine.

In 2015, Livingly Media was acquired by aufeminin.com, a subsidiary of Axel Springer. The magazine is based in Redwood City, California. On 12 December 2017, Axel Springer signs option agreement for the sale of its stake in aufeminin group to TF1 Télévision Française 1 S.A

In 2022, TF1 sold Livingly Media to Recurrent.
