= Perseus Books Group =

American publishing company

- Parent company: Perseus LLC - Lagardère SCA
- Founded: 1996; 30 years ago
- Founder: Frank Pearl
- Country of origin: United States
- Headquarters location: New York City, U.S.
- Key people: David Steinberger (President and CEO)
- Imprints: 12
- Official website: perseusbooks.com

Perseus Books Group was an American publishing company founded in year 1996 by investor Frank Pearl. Perseus acquired the trade publishing division of Addison-Wesley (including the Merloyd Lawrence Books imprint) in 1997.

In 2005, Perseus acquired Client Distribution Services, the former distribution arm of Random House. It was named Publisher of the Year in 2007 by Publishers Weekly magazine for its role in taking on publishers formerly distributed by the Publishers Group West and acquiring Avalon Publishing Group. In January 2007, the Perseus Books Group purchased Avalon Publishing Group, the parent company of Carroll & Graf Publishers and Thunder's Mouth Press. The purchaser folded both imprints and stopped publishing books under those names in May 2007.

In 2014, after the bankruptcy auction of Good Books assets, Skyhorse Publishing sold the Mayo Clinic line to Perseus. It was then incorporated and released through Perseus' Da Capo Lifelong imprint. After the death of Frank Pearl, Perseus was sold to Centre Lane Partners in 2015, a private equity firm. In April 2016, its name and publishing business was acquired by Hachette Book Group and its distribution business by Ingram Content Group.

In December 2018, Hachette Books became an imprint of the Perseus Books division. Concurrently, Da Capo Press and Da Capo's Lifelong became part of Hachette.

== Imprints ==
The Perseus Books Group has these imprints:

- Avalon Travel
  - Moon Publications
  - Rick Steves (formerly John Muir Publications)
- Basic Books
  - Basic Civitas
  - Seal Press
- DaCapo
- Hachette Books
- Running Press
- PublicAffairs
  - Nation Books

=== Former imprints ===
Before Avalon Publishing Group was integrated into the Perseus Books Group, it published on 14 imprint presses. In 2007, some of the imprints were integrated into the Perseus Books Group, while others folded or were sold to other companies. Perseus also sold one of their imprints in the restructuring process.

==== Avalon Publishing Group ====
- Axoplasm
- Black Square Editions
- Blue Moon Books
- Carroll & Graf Publishers—acquired in 1998 and folded in 2007
- Four Walls Eight Windows—absorbed into Thunder's Mouth Press in 2004
- Marlowe & Company—absorbed into the DaCapo imprint
- No Exit Press
- Seal Press
- Shoemaker & Hoard Publishers—sold to Counterpoint LLC
- Thunder's Mouth Press—folded in 2007

==== Perseus Books Group ====
- Counterpoint Press—sold to Counterpoint LLC
- Vanguard Press started in 2007 and closed in 2012
- Weinstein Books—closed in 2017
- Westview—sold to Taylor & Francis and absorbed into Routledge

== Distribution ==
Perseus previously owned separate book distribution companies.

- Publishers Group West (PGW), founded in 1976, based in Berkeley, California
- Consortium Book Sales and Distribution, founded in 1985, based in Saint Paul, Minnesota
- Perseus Distribution, founded in 1999, based in Manhattan, New York
- Legato Publishers Group, founded in 2013, based in Chicago
