= Domino (magazine) =

American home magazine

- First new issue of domino, Fall 2013
- Categories: Home
- Frequency: Quarterly
- First issue: April 2005; 21 years ago
- Company: Recurrent Ventures
- Country: United States
- Language: English
- Website: domino.com
- ISSN: 1554-7361

Domino is an American home magazine which was in circulation between April 2005 and March 2009, and then relaunched as a print and digital magazine and ecommerce platform in October 2013.

== History ==
Premier issue of Domino, summer 2005

Launched by Condé Nast in 2004, domino is a style magazine centered on the home. Its first issue appeared in Spring of 2005. In its first year, domino was honored by The Hot List Startup of the Year by Adweek, Top Launch of the Year by Media Industry Newsletter and The A-List 10 under 50 by Advertising Age. The magazine grew to a rate base of 800,000 by its third year, and received two National Magazine Award nominations from the American Society of Magazine Editors (ASME). In October 2008, domino released its first book, domino: the Book of Decorating, published by Simon & Schuster.

On January 28, 2009, Condé Nast announced that it would cease publication of domino and its website. In its closing web comments, the editors reported that in a down economy advertising revenues could not keep up with expenses. In that same year Condé Nast also shuttered Modern Bride, Elegant Bride, Gourmet and Cookie.

After a hiatus of four years, domino was relaunched in 2013 by the Domino Media Group. The return of the magazine was accompanied by a new website, domino.com with the stated purpose of "bringing content, community and commerce together."

Domino Media Group was initially owned by its three founders — Andy Appelbaum, Cliff Sirlin, and Aaron Wallace, with Condé Nast retaining an interest in the brand as a minority investor. It was acquired by St. Louis–based digital media company Multiply in June 2018. Domino was sold to private equity firm North Equity in February 2021. North Equity then spun out Domino and their other digital media holdings- including Dwell and Lonny- to Recurrent Ventures in June 2021. The magazine transitioned to a fully digital publication after the acquisition, with their first digital issue released in November 2021.

== Staff ==
The founding editor in chief of domino was Deborah Needleman. She has written on gardens and design for the New York Times; Slate, where she penned the column “The Cranky Gardener”; and House & Garden, where she was Editor-at-Large. Needleman was named a Top Talent to Watch by Women’s Wear Daily and a Circle of Excellence award winner by the International Furniture and Design Association (IFDA).

Michelle Adams, co-founder of Lonny magazine, was named editor in chief for the relaunch of domino in 2013 and original publisher Beth Brenner returned as chief revenue officer. In October 2015, Jessica Romm, a veteran of domino, Elle Decor, and Martha Stewart Living, was named editorial director of domino magazine.

== Domino Book of Decorating ==
The Book of Decorating is the first book from the creators of domino. The book was edited by Deborah Needleman, Sara Ruffin Costello and Dara Caponigro. domino: The Book of Decorating, is a style manual marketed as "bringing together inspiring rooms, how-to advice and insiders’ secrets from today’s top tastemakers". In the Fall of 2015, domino announced a sequel to be released in 2016 or 2017.

== My Deco File ==
My Deco File is a web-based application created by domino magazine that lets users organize decorating ideas and images. A big hit with readers from the time of its inception, it was reintroduced with the return of domino in 2013.
