= Grio Awards =

American award ceremony held by The Grio

The Grio Awards are annual national awards bestowed in a number of categories by TheGrio (theGrio.com), an American news website geared toward African Americans. The Grio is a division of the MSNBC cable channel. Begun in 2010, the Grio's list of 100 "History Makers in the Making" honors those who are shaping American's future today; its award winners are selected not only from the African American community, but from all sections of America.

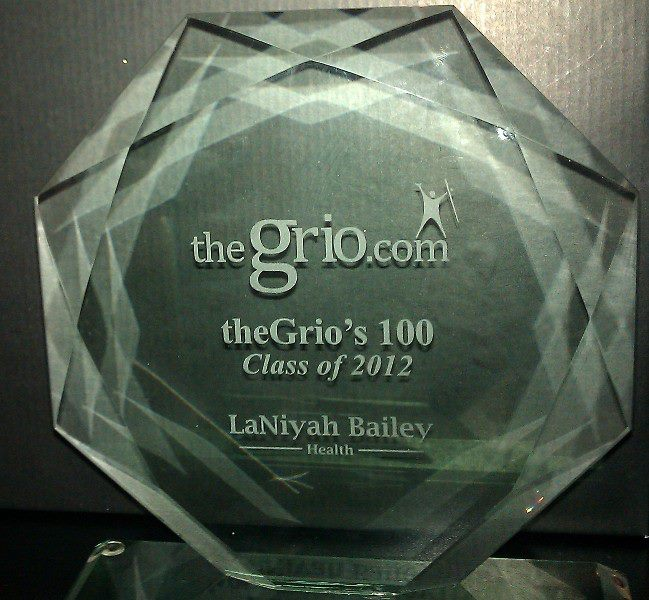
Grio Award

The ten award categories are Business, Health, Education, Science & the Environment, Media, Pop Culture, Arts & Culture, Service & Activism, Politics and Sports, and ten people are selected from each category. To make the Grio 100 list, winners must display a large-scale impact on all of America, and their work must be ongoing. The editorial team at theGrio.com, after consulting contributors and experts, decides the outcome of the awards. The top 100 change every year.

== Grio Awards 2022 ==
- Dave Chappelle, comedian, Cultural Icon Award

== Grio Awards 2013 ==
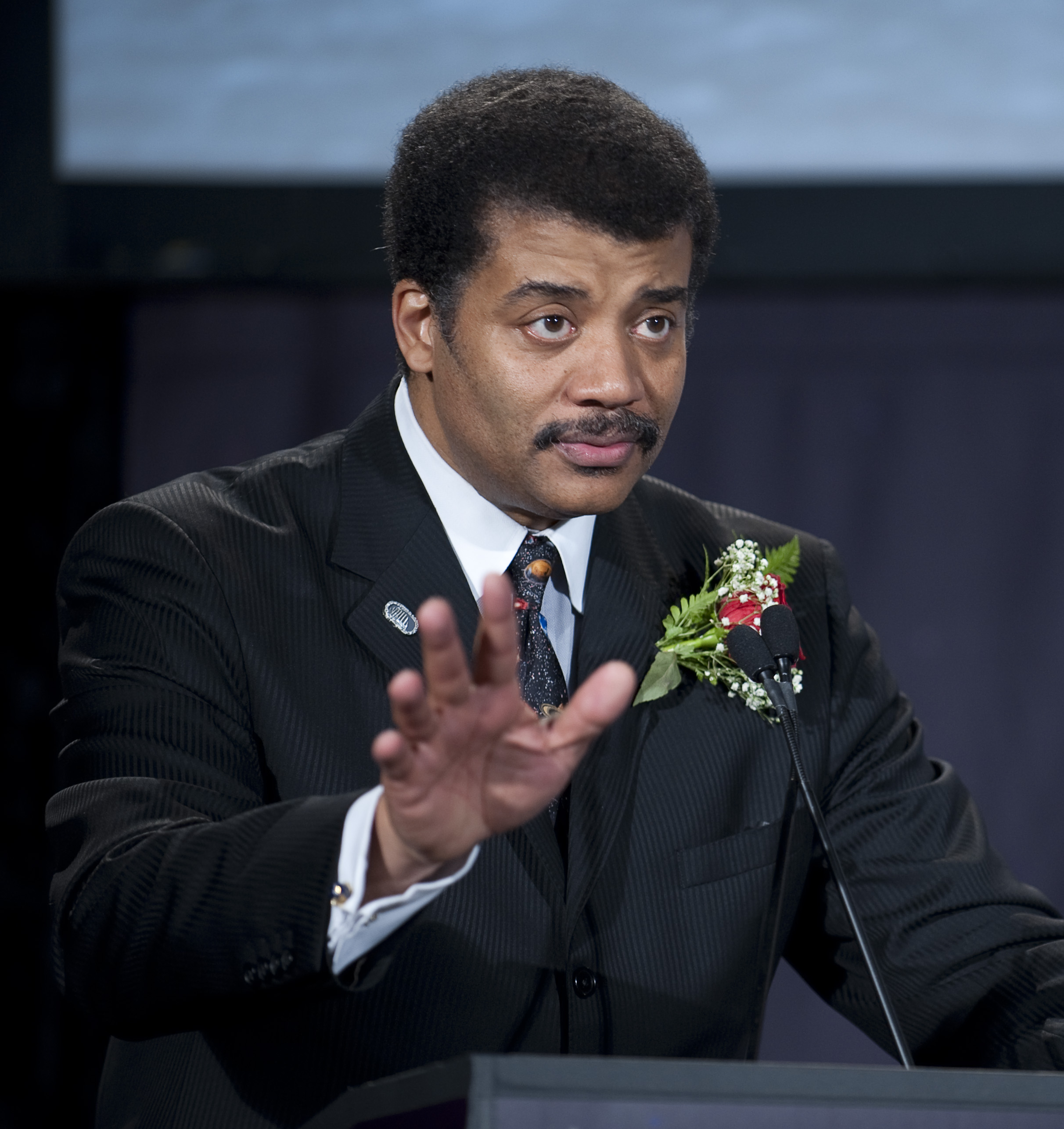
Neil deGrasse Tyson, 2013 winner

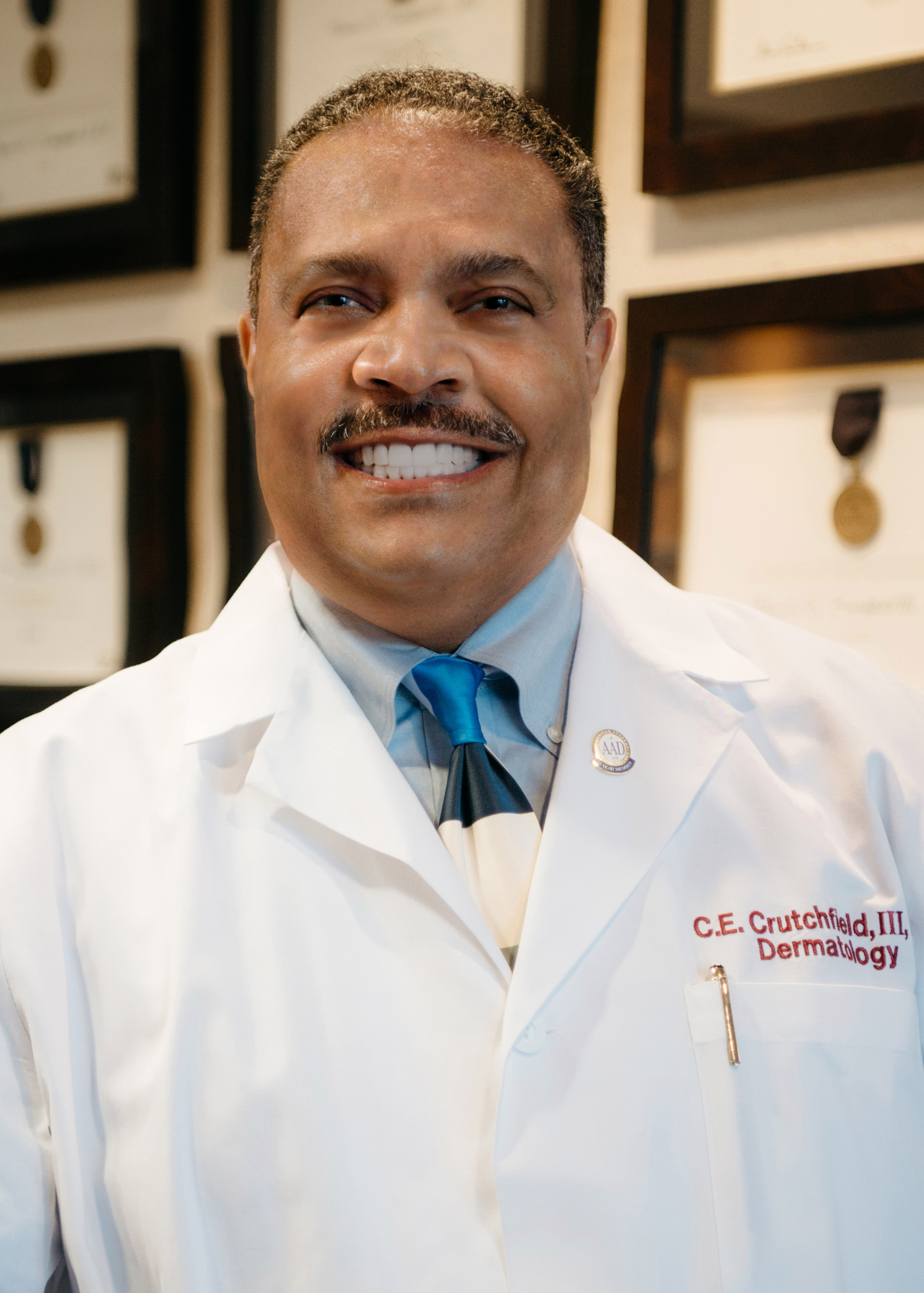
Charles E. Crutchfield III, 2013 winner

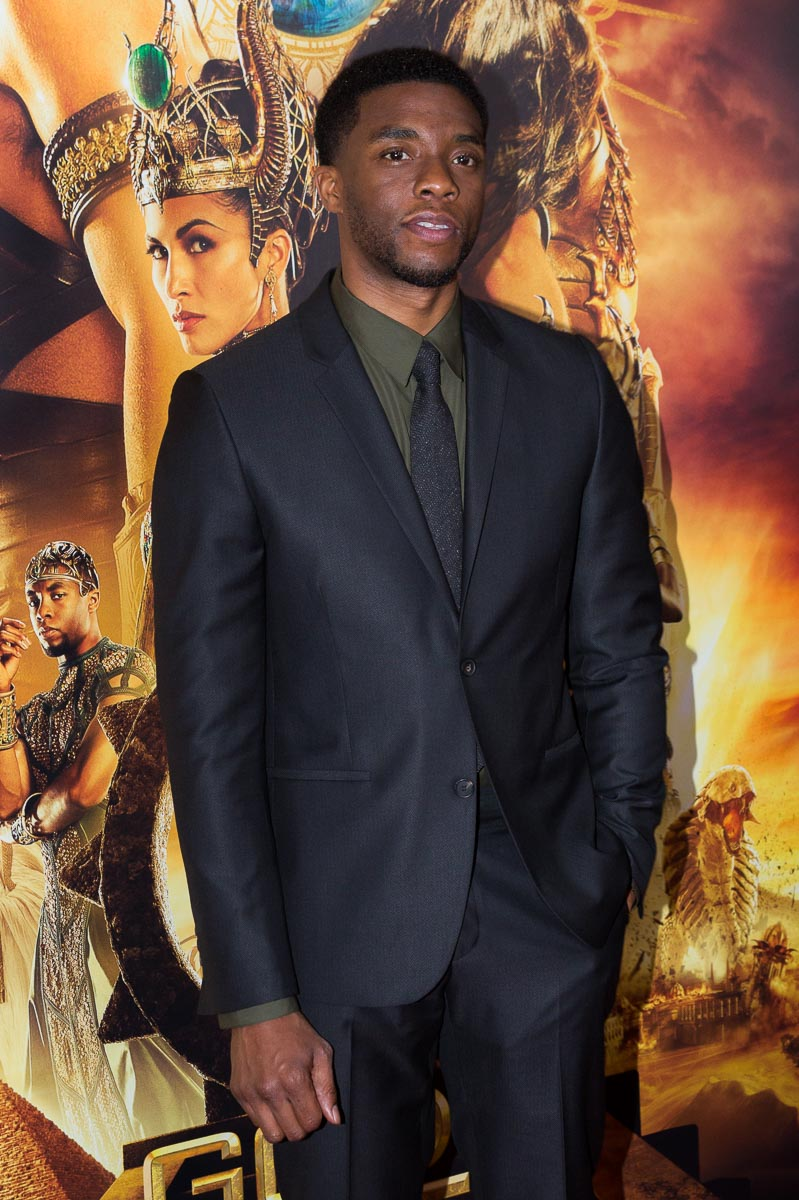
Chadwick Boseman, 2013 winner

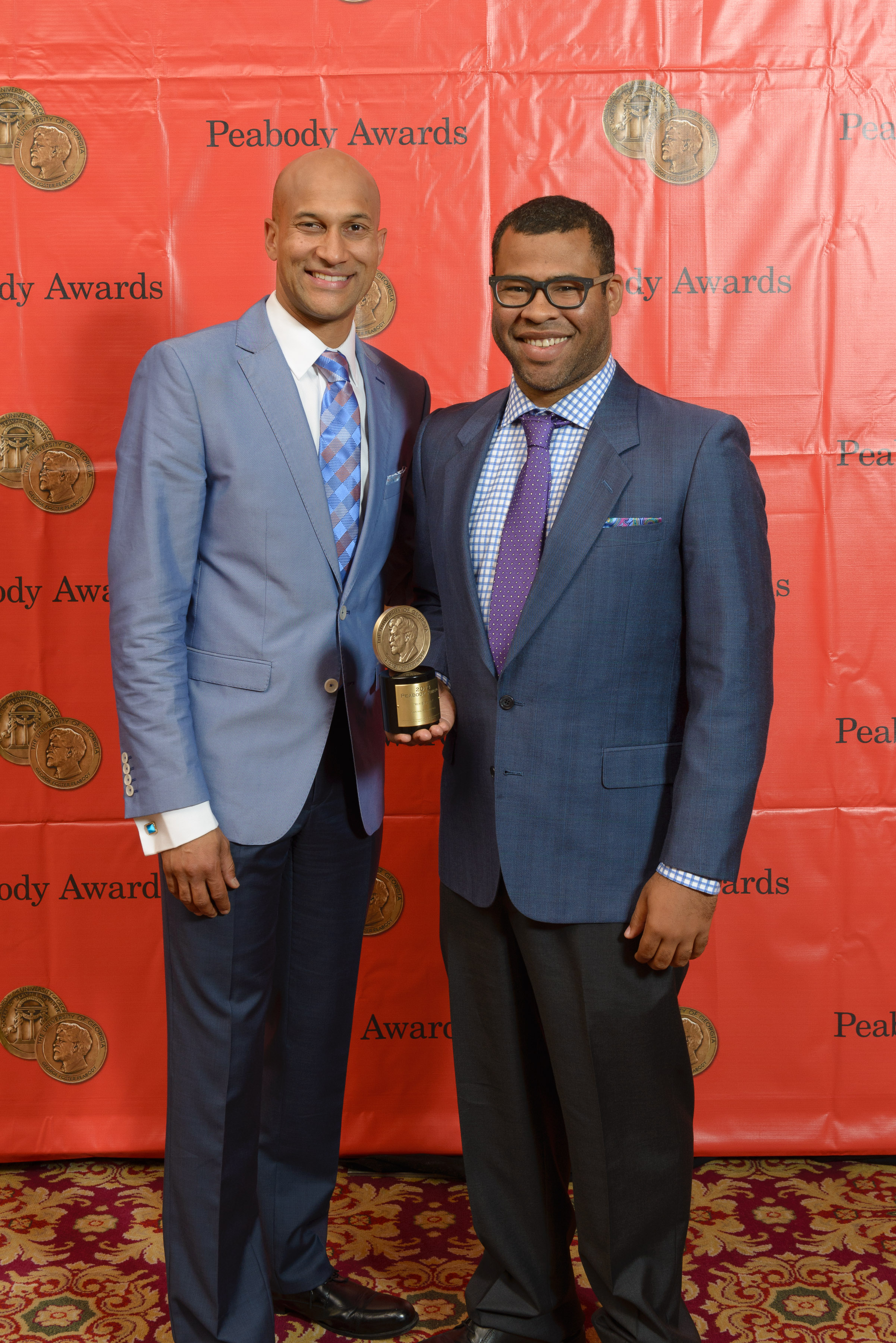
Keegan-Michael Key and Jordan Peele, 2013 winners

- Charles E. Crutchfield III, M.D., dermatologist
- Amar'e Stoudemire, professional basketball player
- Terrie M. Williams, advocate for mental health awareness

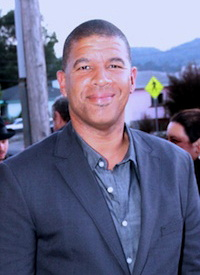
Peter Ramsey, 2013 winner

- Carolyn McCaskill, sign language advocate
- Anthony McGill and Demarre McGill, classical musicians
- Terrence J., TV personality
- Keegan-Michael Key and Jordan Peele, comedy duo
- Drs. Vincent and Vance Moss, surgeons
- Peter Ramsey, film director
- Quvenzhané Wallis, actress
- Will Packer, film producer
- Franchesca Ramsey, designer, blogger, and comedian
- Rick Kittles, scientific director of African Ancestry, Inc.
- Ava DuVernay, film director
- Kerry Washington, actress
- Nick Cave, contemporary artist
- Claressa Shields, Olympic boxer
- Dr. Nadine Gracia, director of the Office of Minority Health
- Gabby Douglas, Olympic gymnast

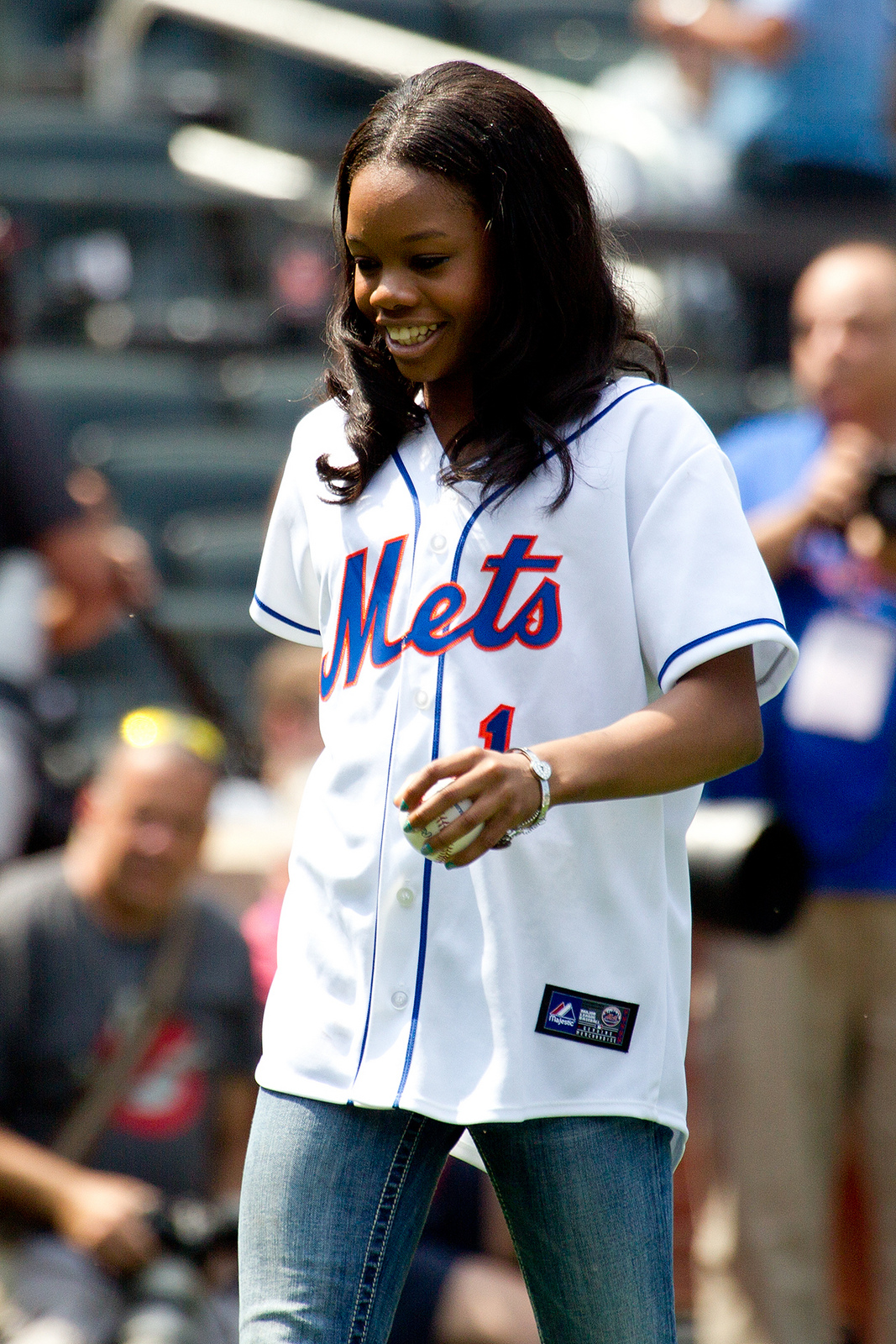
Gabby Douglas, 2013 winner

- Ty Hunter, Beyoncé's stylist
- Arian Foster, NFL player
- Keija Minor, editor-in-chief of Condé Nast Magazine
- Dr. Robert J. Gore, doctor and violence prevention advocate
- Neil deGrasse Tyson, astrophysicist
- Ken Williams, general manager of the Chicago White Sox
- Tripoli Patterson, champion surfer
- Dr. Naeemah Ghafur, family medicine physician
- Judy Smith, inspiration behind the hit show Scandal
- Dr. Kafui Dzirasa, mental health research healer
- Solange Knowles, singer
- Rob Nabors, Director of Legislative Affairs at the White House
- Walter Kimbrough, president of Dillard University
- Dr. Marilyn Hughes Gaston and Dr. Gayle K. Porter, promoters of health among midlife women
- Kendrick Lamar, hip-hop artist
- Gary Clark Jr., blues artist
- Elle Varner, R&B artist

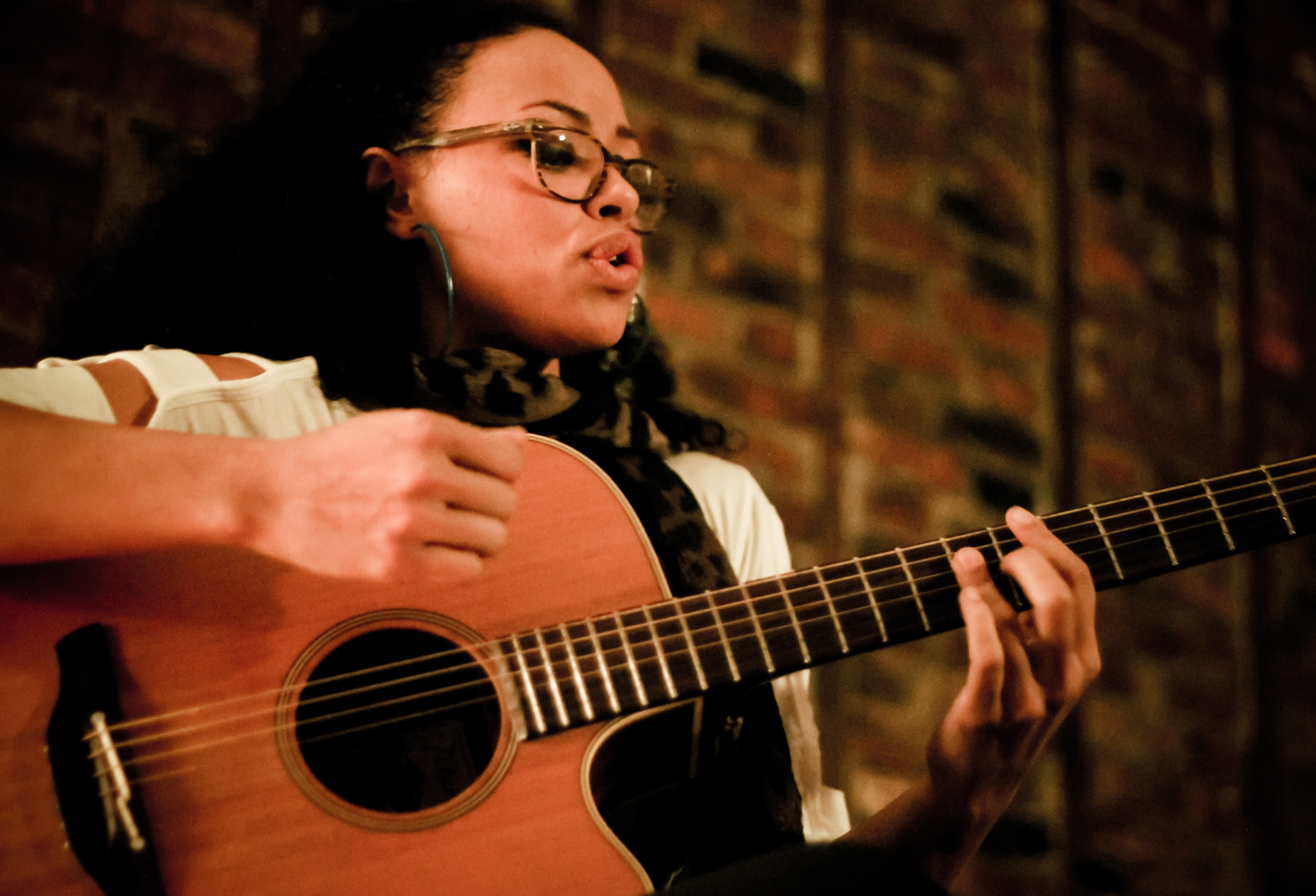
Elle Varner, 2013 winner

- Antron Brown, drag racer
- Wendy Williams, daytime TV personality
- Taylor Townsend, tennis player
- Benjamin Crump, Legal Hand for victims
- Madu Eneli, teen author
- Drs. James K. Aikins Jr. and Charletta A. Ayers, co-founders of International HealthCare Volunteers, Inc.
- Ken Strickland, NBC's Washington, D.C. bureau chief
- Jabari Parker, basketball player
- Nina Turner, Ohio state senator
- Brendon Ayanbadejo, Super Bowl-winning LGBT advocate
- Susan Rice, United States National Security Advisor
- Robert Griffin III, NFL player
- Lia Neal, Olympic swimmer
- RZA, Wu-Tang Clan member
- Wanda Butts, founder of the Josh Project
- Rodney Stearns, iPhone app developer
- Aprille Ericsson, engineer
- Shaun Evans, owner of OMBO Apps
- Ibranhim Abdul-Matin, author of 'Green Deen: What Islam Teaches About Protecting The Planet'
- Kat Calvin, founder of 'Black Girls Hack'
- Lee Saunders, president of the nation's largest labor union

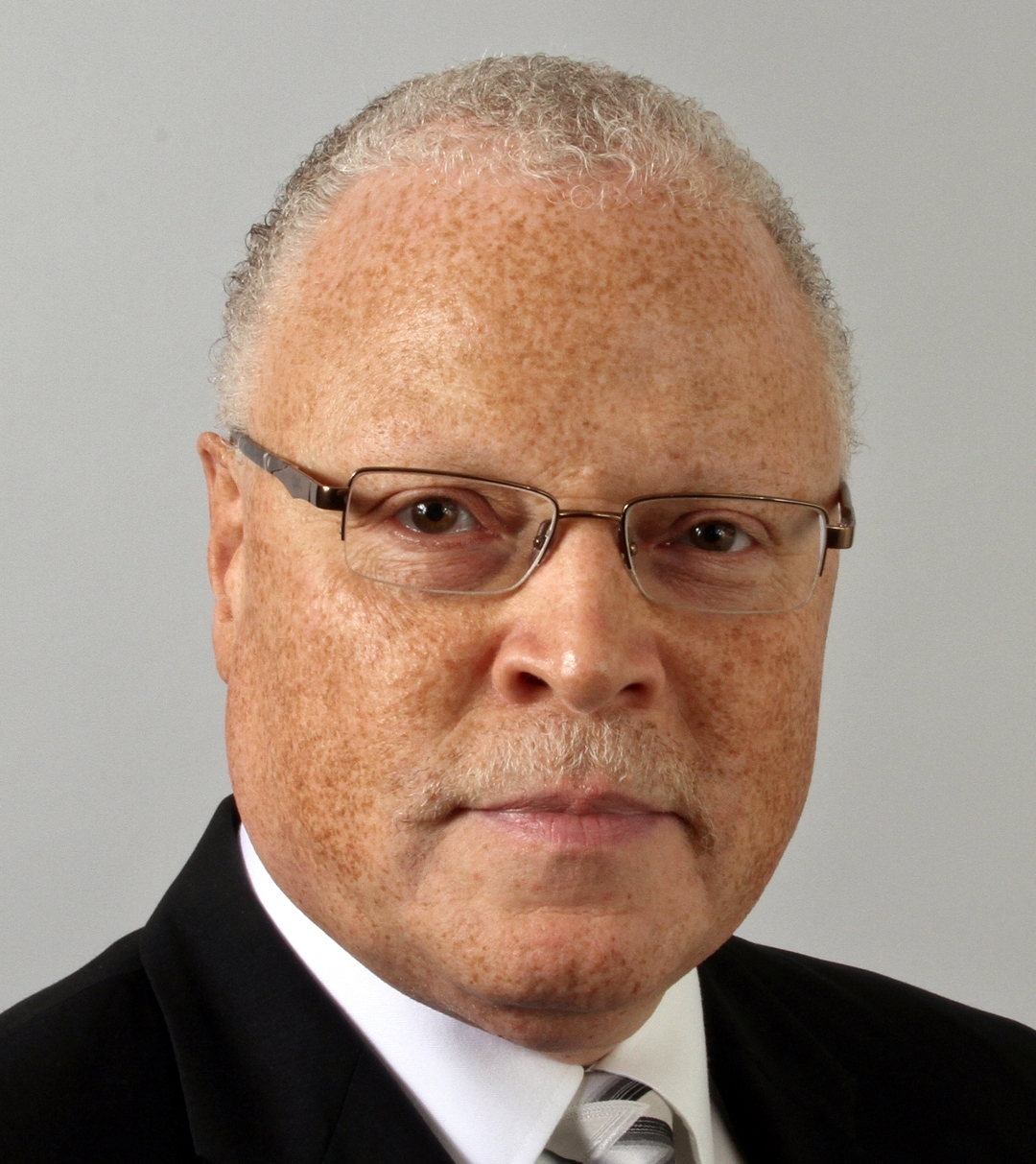
Lee Saunders, 2013 winner

- Laura Smalls, fashion designer
- William Barber, civil rights leader
- Svante Myrick, mayor of Ithaca, New York
- Kiante Young, entrepreneur
- Nzinga Knight, designer
- Anthony Foxx, mayor of Charlotte, North Carolina
- Amos Winbush III, musician and tech entrepreneur
- Dinaw Mengestu, novelist
- Randal Pinkett, Apprentice winner
- Dambisa Moyo, economist
- Vera Moore, soap opera star and makeup guru
- Salaam Coleman Smith, president of NBC Universal's Style network
- Mellody Hobson, leader of Ariel Investments

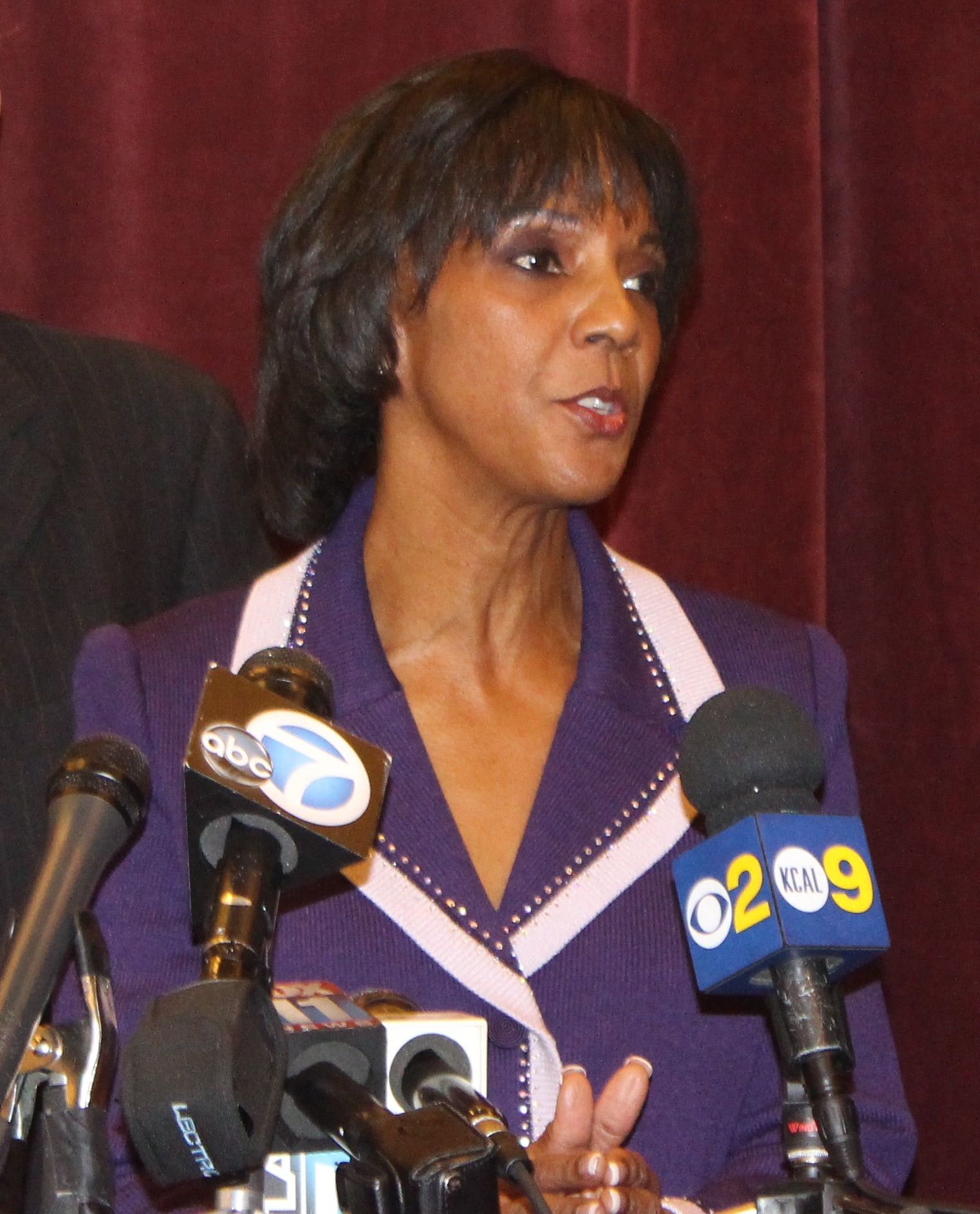
Jackie Lacey, 2013 winner

- Earl Phalen, CEO and founder of Phalen Leadership Academies and Summer Advantage USA
- Oscar L. Harris, businessman and architect
- Farrah Gray, book publisher
- Sabrina Lamb, author and media commentator
- Dylan C. Penningroth, history professor
- Susan E. Chapman, SVP of Global Real Estate and Workplace Enablement for American Express
- Dorian Warren, Columbia University Scholar-Activist
- Tommie Lindsey, teacher
- Tambay Obenson, film fanatic
- Brittney Exline, Ivy League prodigy

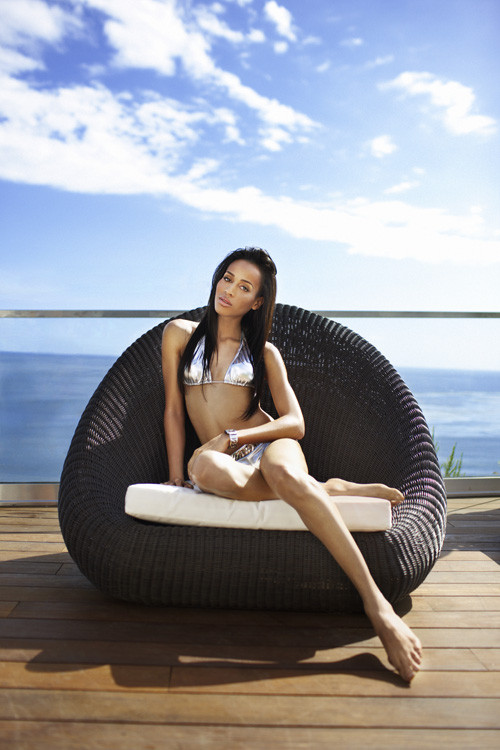
Isis King, 2013 winner

- Dean Baquet, managing editor of the Times
- Chadwick Boseman, actor
- Steven Horsford, Nevada Congressman
- Mario Armstrong, co-founder of Urban Videogame Academy
- Emi Kolawole, Washington Post blogger
- Michael Strahan, former NFL player
- Stefanie Brown, National African American Vote director
- Gregory Lowe, CEO of Lowekey Media
- Barbara R. Arwine, executive director of Lawyer's Committee for Civil Rights under Law
- Jackie Lacey, Los Angeles County District Attorney
- Brittney Griner, basketball player
- Swizz Beatz, hip-hop producer
- Beverly Bond, founder of Black Girls Rock, Inc.
- Valeisha Butterfield Jones, chair of the Women in Entertainment Empowerment Network
- Nerfertiti Martin and Emily Carpenter, gender equality youth activists
- Isis King, transgender activist
- Robin Roberts, co-host, Good Morning America
- Kelvin Doe, teen innovator
- Karen Lewis, president, Chicago Teachers Union
- Suzanne Shank, president and CEO, Siebert Brandford and Shank

== Grio Awards 2012 ==
- C.J. Senter, child fitness instructor
- Jon 'Bones' Jones, youngest UFC Light Heavyweight Champion in history

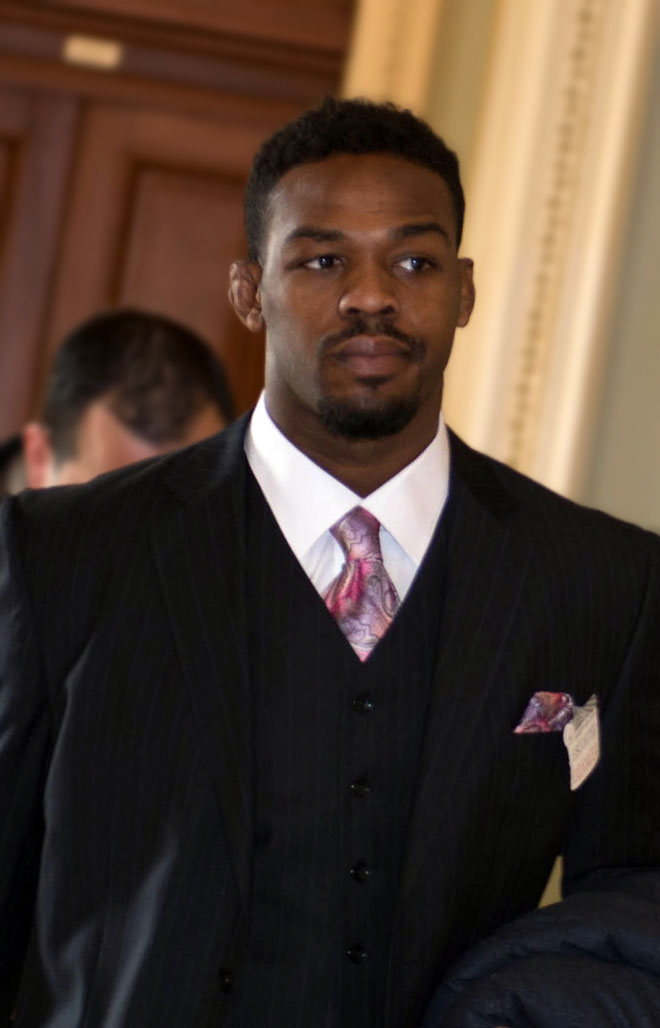
Jon 'Bones' Jones, 2012 winner

- Ibtihaj Muhammad, fencer
- Justus Williams, youngest black chess master
- Chris Broussard, ESPN sports analyst
- Yvette Clarke, Representative for New York
- Kevin Clash, puppeteer and voice actor
- Ryan Speedo Green, opera singer
- Angela Benton, founder of Black Web 2.0
- Octavia Spencer, actress

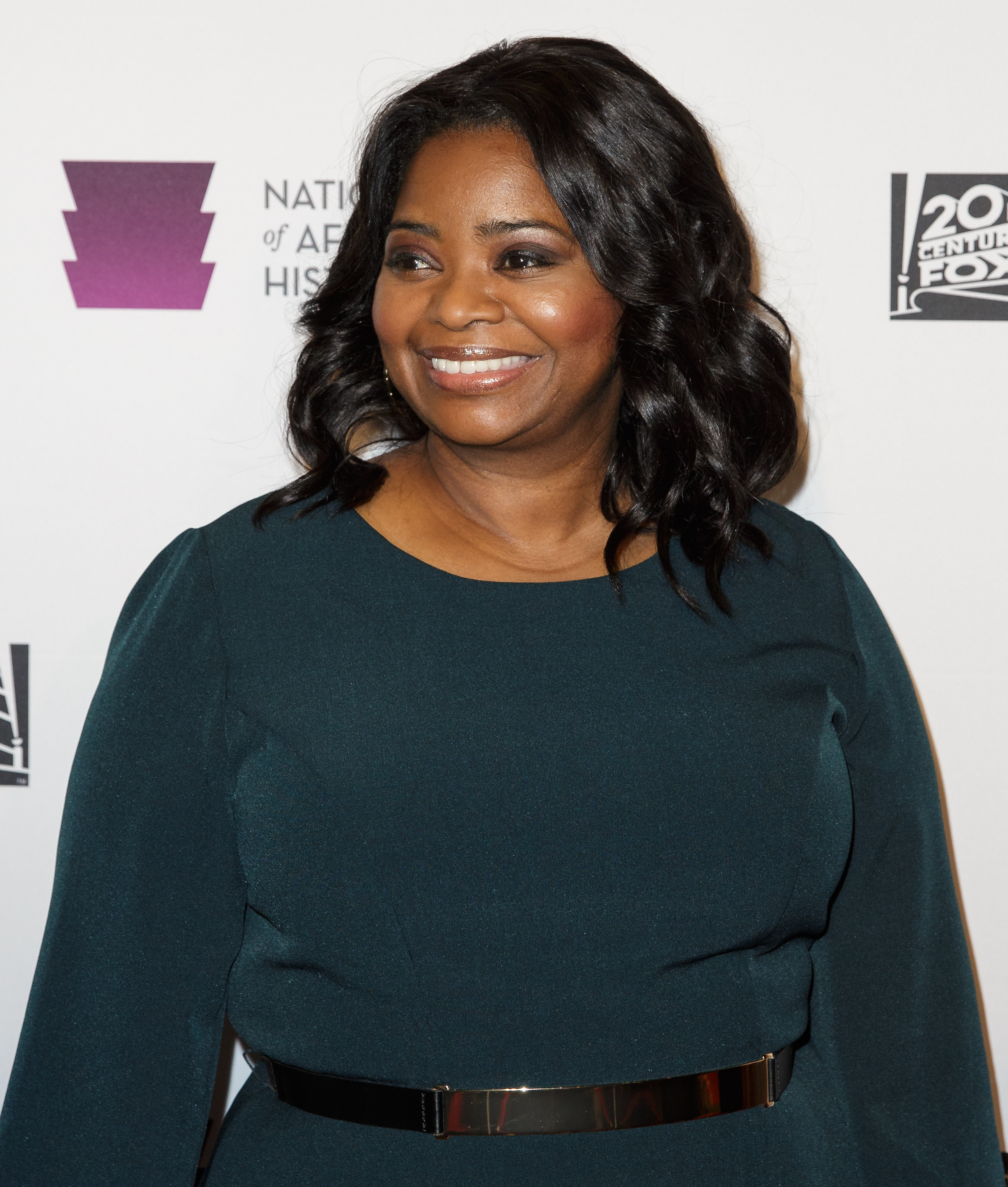
Octavia Spencer, 2012 winner

- Valerie Montgomery Rice, dean of Morehouse School of Medicine
- Melissa Harris-Perry, author and political commentator
- Maya Rudolph, actress

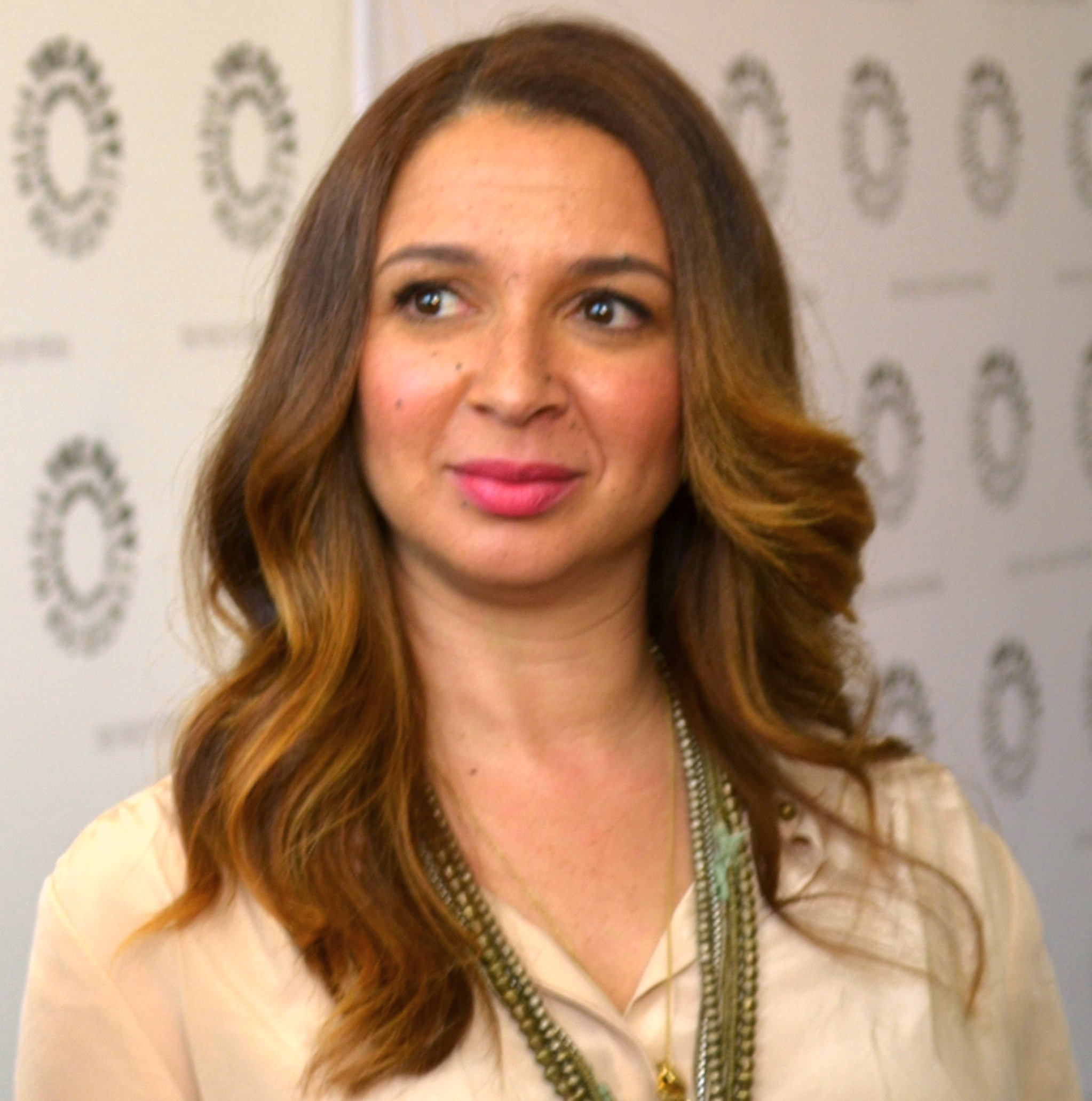
Maya Rudolph, 2012 winner

- Elisabeth Omilami, actress and human rights activist
- Sonya Arrington, founder of Mothers Against Teen Violence
- Marcia Anderson, first black woman to hold major general rank in the U.S. Army
- Janet Mock, transgender rights advocate
- Frederica Wilson, Representative for Florida
- Radcliffe Bailey, artist
- Mara Brock Akil, creator of Girlfriends and The Game
- Chuck Baker, founder of FileBlaze
- Maimah Karmo, breast cancer awareness advocate
- George Andrews, founder and CEO of Capitol City Bank & Trust
- Alonzo Washington, comic book artist
- Andrew 'Bo' Young, III, civil rights leader
- Cheryl Mills, counselor and chief of staff, Department of State

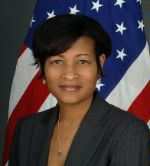
Cheryl Mills, 2012 winner

- Nicole Lyons, car builder and drag racer
- Anthony Robles, NCAA wrestling champion
- Nigel Sylvester, professional BMX rider
- Deanna Sutton, founder of Clutch magazine
- Chandra Gill, motivator and educator
- Jason Taylor (American football), NFL player
- Cam Newton, NFL player
- Bryan 'Birdman' Williams, rapper
- LaNiyah Bailey, author
- Felecia Hatcher, co-founder of gourmet ice cream truck line
- Katori Hall, playwright, journalist, and actress
- Kevin Olusola, cellist and beatboxer
- Alvin Brown, first black mayor of Jacksonville
- Jennifer Carroll, Lieutenant Governor of Florida
- Kevin Hart, actor and comedian

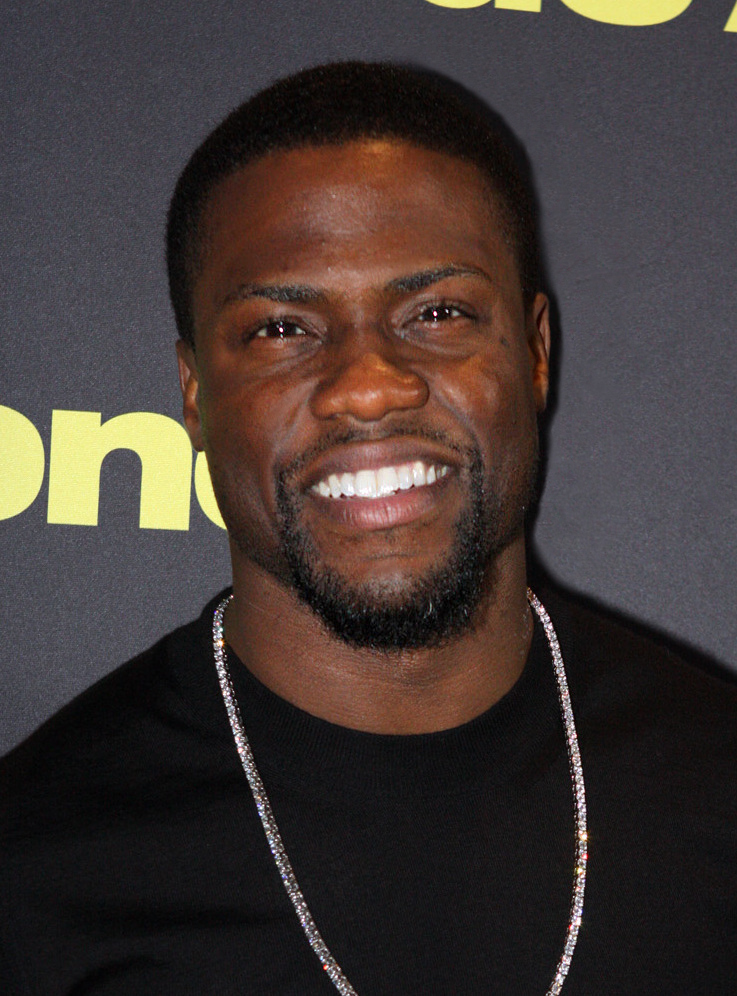
Kevin Hart, 2012 winner

- Tyrone Curry, school custodian and coach
- Traci Lester, literacy advocate
- Tarell Alvin McCraney, playwright and actor
- Tiya Miles, historian and professor
- Toni Carey and Ashley Hicks, founders of Black Girls Run!
- Nitty Scott, MC
- Michael Roberts, businessman
- Sandra Tucker, nursing school dean
- Tia Norfleet, NASCAR driver hopeful
- Bryant Terry, chef
- T. J. Holmes, news anchor
- Tracee Ellis Ross, actress
- Van Jones, social entrepreneur

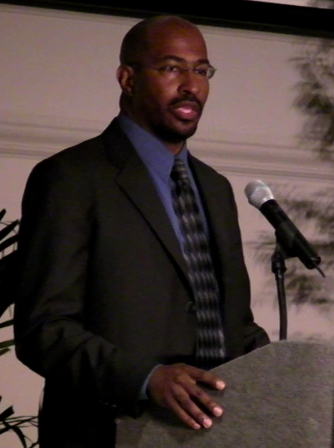
Van Jones, 2012 winner

- Afam Onyema, hospital builder
- John Hunter, creator of World Peace Games
- Nicholas Cobb, philanthropist
- Willow Smith, actress and Musician
- Nnamdi Asomugha, NFL player
- Torrence Boone, Google managing director
- Aton Edwards, environmental and social activist
- Angella Reid, former White House Chief Usher
- DeVon Franklin, movie executive
- Chazz Darby, chef
- The Holistic Life Foundation Founders, yoga instructors
- Garth Fagan, dance choreographer
- Roblé Ali, chef
- Yvette Miley, vice president and executive editor of MSNBC
- Leanna Archer, hair and body care CEO
- Anthony Fraiser, start-up entrepreneur
- Kevin Lewis, White House Director of black media
- Daniell Washington, marine biologist and activist
- Corvida Raven, social media entrepreneur
- Chinedu Echeruo, founder of HopStop
- Patrick Gaspard, executive director of the Democratic National Committee

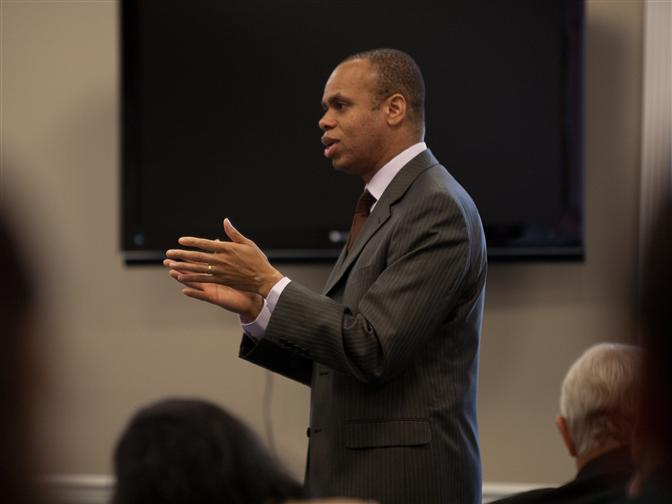
Patrick Gaspard, 2012 winner

- Jeff Henderson, chef
- Jonathon Prince, runner and speaker
- Jermaine Griggs, music site founder
- Frank Ocean, hip hop artist
- Korto Momolu, designer
- MC Hammer, rapper

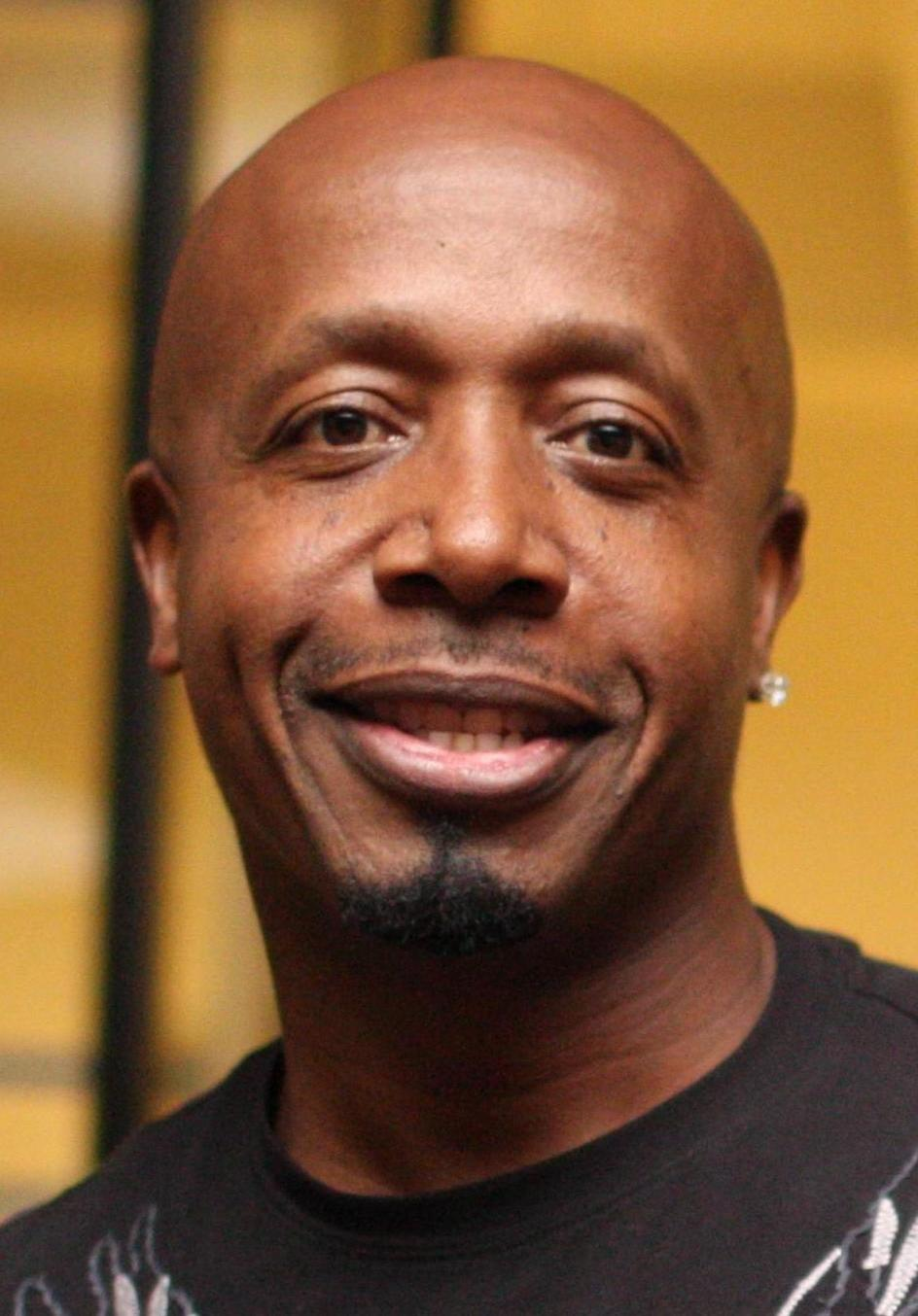
MC Hammer, 2012 winner

- Christopher 'Ludacris' Bridges, rapper
- Dhani Jones, former NFL player
- Jess Moore, fashionista
- Alie Kabba, Sierra Leonean immigrant activist
- Jana Johnson, tech analyst
- LeVar Burton, actor and Presenter
- Doyle Beneby, president and CEO of CPS Energy
- Andre 'Dr. Dre' Young, hip hop icon
- Ayanna Pressley, first black woman elected to Boston City Council
- Cheryl Pearson-McNeil, executive at The Nielsen Company
- Carol Jenkins, media leader
- Brenda Combs, founder of 'Finding My Shoes'

== Grio Awards 2011 ==
- Che 'RhymeFest' Smith, hip hop artist
- Michael Blake, Obama Black Outreach supporter
- Tim Scott, senator from South Carolina

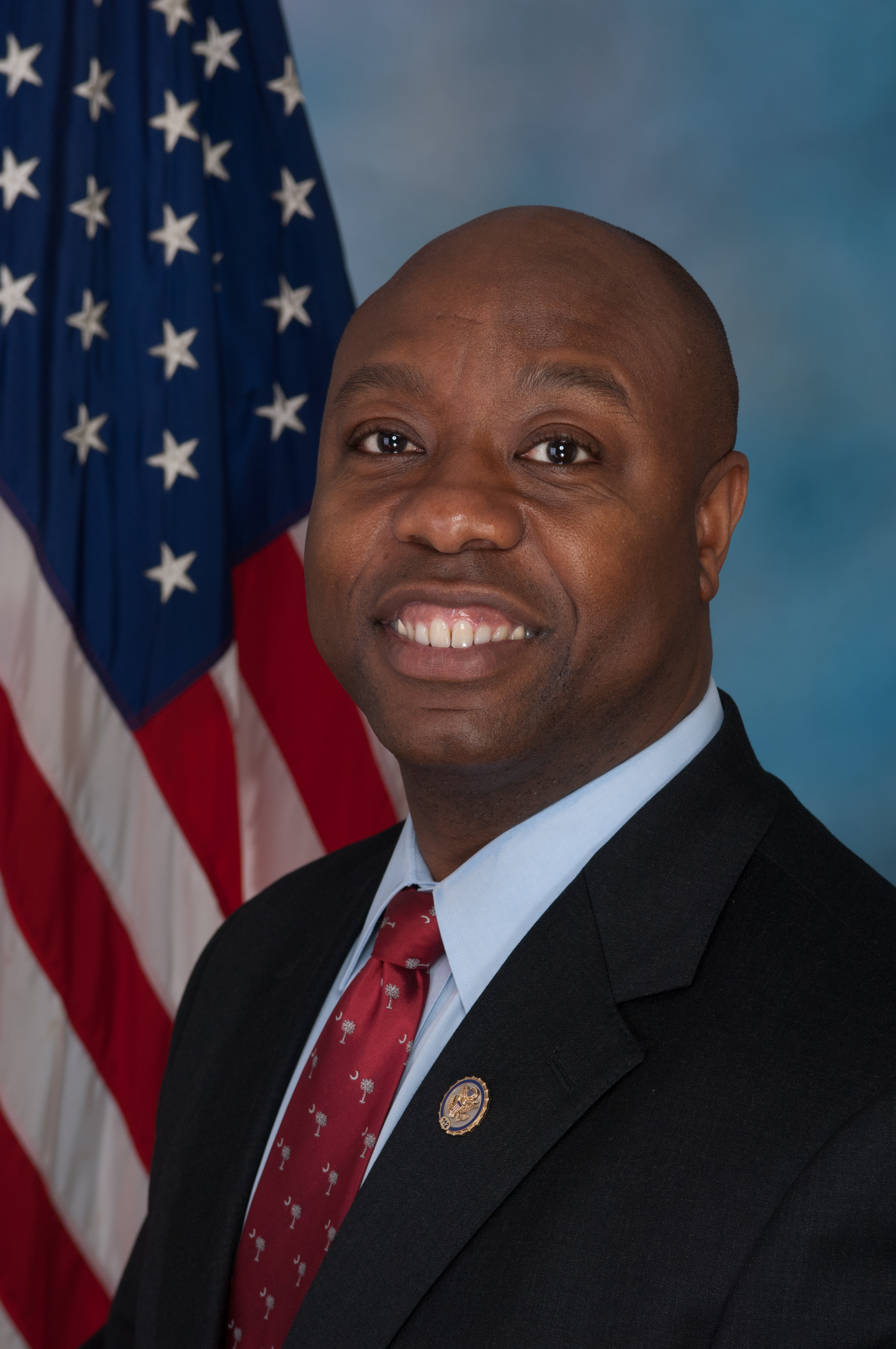
Tim Scott, 2011 winner

- Kasim Reed, Atlanta mayor
- Cedric Richmond, Representative from Louisiana
- Donna Edwards, Representative from Maryland
- Erica Williams, social impact strategist
- Keith Ellison, Minnesota Congressman
- Terri Sewell, Alabama Congresswoman
- Wyatt Cenac, comedian

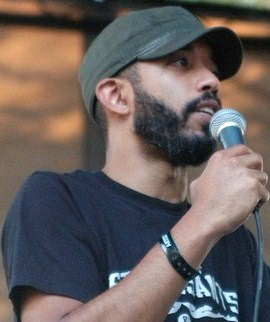
Wyatt Cenac, 2011 winner

- Mark Luckie, digital media specialist
- Marve Frazier, social media mogul
- Gabi Gregg, MTV personality
- Tristan Walker, Foursquare's Business Development VP
- Bernal Smith, publisher of the Tri-State Defender
- Bill Burton, senior political strategist
- Hallerin Hilton Hill, American talk radio host
- Lolis Eric Elie, writer and documentary filmmaker
- Samantha Fennell, managing director of Cesanamedia/Out There
- Tamron Hall, national correspondent for NBC News
- Christina Oliver, Marine corporal
- Decker Ngongang, senior associate at Echoing Green
- Dale Long, Big Brothers Big Sisters advocate
- Jawanza Colvin, reverend
- Joshua Williams, philanthropist
- La'Shanda Holmes, Coast Guard helicopter pilot
- Larry Camel, pastor
- Shaun King, social media entrepreneur
- Terrance Roberts, anti-gang activist
- Tracie Washington, attorney
- Amiya Alexander, entrepreneur
- Bernard Beal, Wall Street mogul
- Cheryl Dorsey, president of Echoing Green
- Don Peebles, real estate king
- Jason Few, former president of Reliant Energy
- Rosalind Brewer, president and CEO of Sam's Club
- John Rice, founder of Management Leadership for Tomorrow
- Kenneth Frazier, Merck CEO

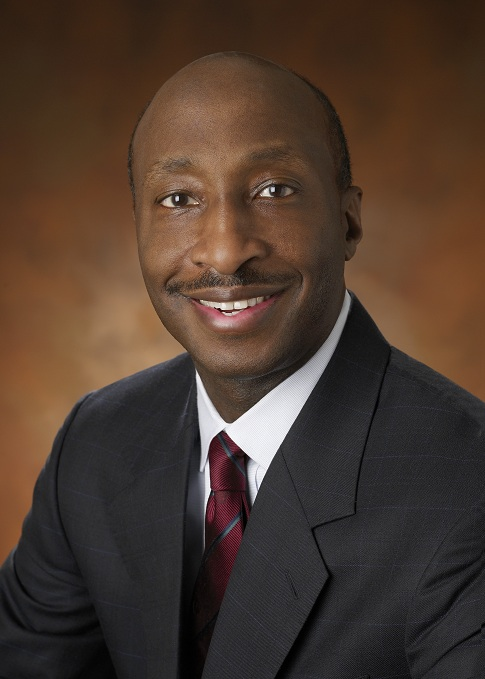
Kenneth Frazier, 2011 winner

- Lisa Price, founder of Carol's Daughter
- Richard Bennett, president of Fidelis Design & Construction
- Chanel Iman, Victoria's Secret Angel
- Donald Glover, comedian
- Isaiah Mustafa, Old Spice pitchman
- J. Cole, rapper
- Janelle Monáe, artist
- Jay Pharoah, actor and Comedian
- Michael Kenneth Williams, actor
- Nicki Minaj, hip hop artist

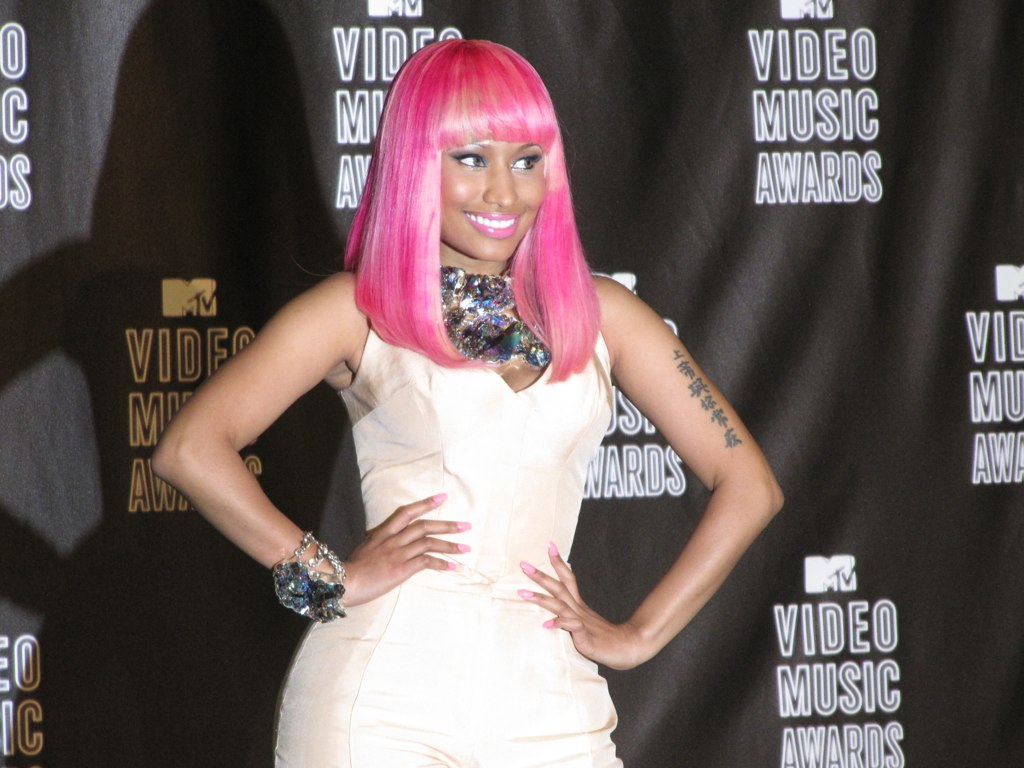
Nicki Minaj, 2011 winner

- Rihanna, singer
- Viola Davis, actress
- Aaron Shirley, physician and civil rights activist
- Carnell Cooper, doctor
- Eugene Sawyer, medical director
- Hydeia Broadbent, HIV/AIDS activist
- Linda Fondren, mayoral candidate in Vicksburg, Mississippi
- Lisa Newman, surgical oncologist
- Michelle Obama, First Lady of the United States
- Nia Froome, young entrepreneur
- Velma Scantlebury, transplant surgeon
- Winston Gandy, doctor and healthcare advocate
- Angela Brown, singer
- Edwidge Danticat, novelist

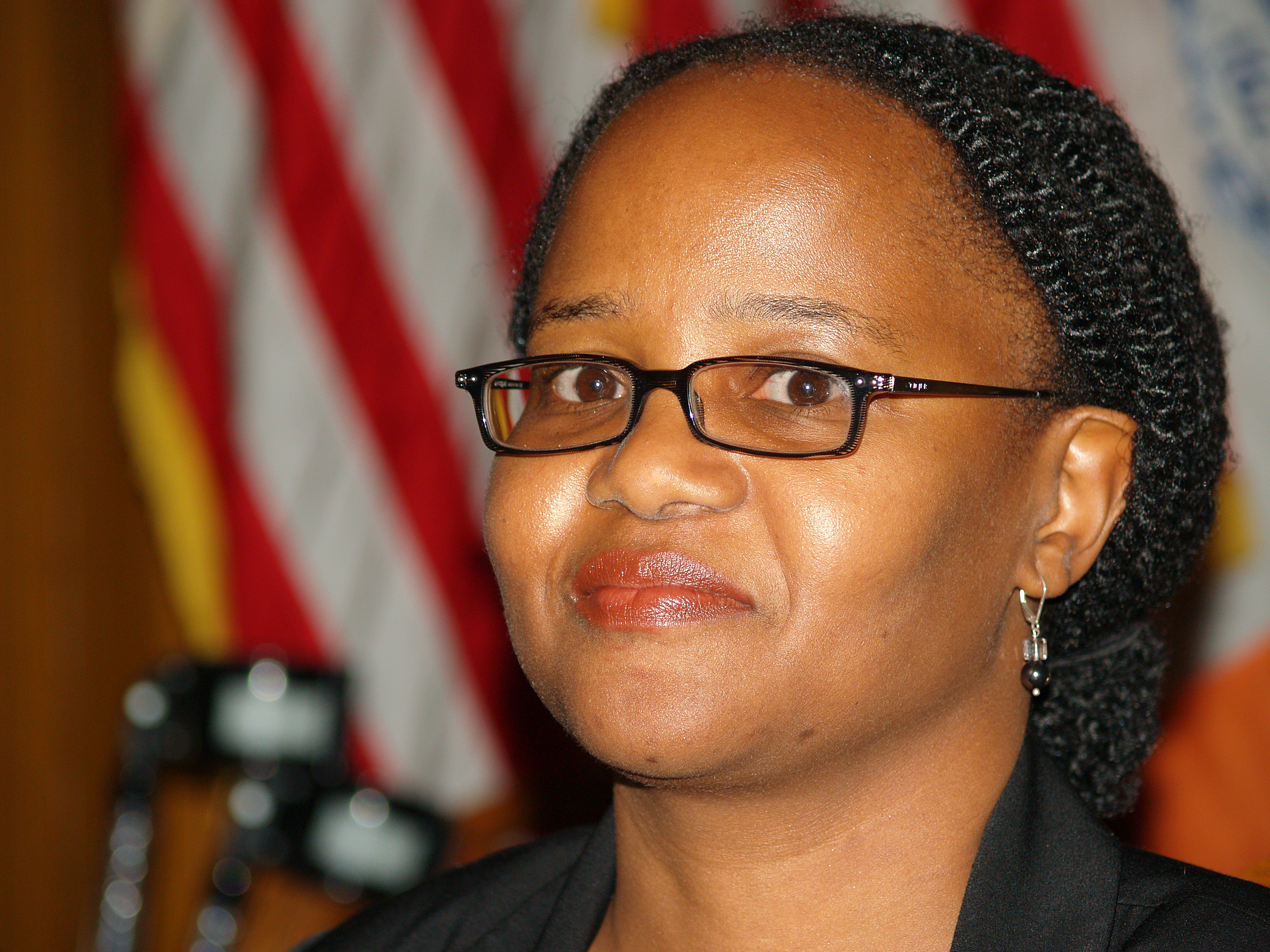
Edwidge Dantiact, 2011 winner

- Joshua Bennett, slam poet
- Kazen Abdullah, classical music conductor
- Kenny Leon, theater director
- Monica Haslip, art innovator
- Robert Battle, choreographer
- Sujari Britt, cellist
- Tanya Hamilton, filmmaker
- Troy 'Trombone Shorty' Andrews, NOLA musician
- John Dabiri, biophysicist
- Phaedra Ellis-Lamkins, environmentalist and CEO of Green For All
- Adriane Brown, president and COO for Intellectual Ventures
- André Fenton, neuroscientist
- Bernard Harris, astronaut
- Cora Marret, acting director of the National Science Foundation
- Donya Douglas, NASA engineer and technologist
- Faye Alexander Nelson, president and CEO of Detroit RiverFront Conservancy
- Monique Harden, environmental human rights advocate
- Njema Frazier, physicist
- Cullen Jones, Olympic swimmer
- DeMaurice Smith, executive director of the National Football League Players Association
- Jason Heyward, baseball player
- Kevin Durant, NBA player
- Kye Allums, NCAA basketball star
- Mariah Stackhouse, golfer
- Mattie Larson, Team USA gymnast
- Myron Rolle, Rhodes Scholar footballer
- Natalie Randolph, football coach
- Terry Kennedy, skateboarder
- Derrell Bradford, education reformer
- Rehema Ellis, reporter
- Courtnay Tyus, director of Admissions and Marketing for Charter High School
- Dominique Lee, education reformer
- Jill Scott R&B star
- John Silvanus Wilson Jr., president of Morehouse College
- Kittie Weston-Knauer, BMX racer
- Robert Bobb, Detroit Education official
- Tamica Stubbs, science teacher
- Terry Houston, Roosevelt High School principal

== Grio Awards 2010 ==
- Ursula Burns, chief executive officer of Xerox
- Tracy Reese, fashion designer
- Jay-Z, musician, rap mogul

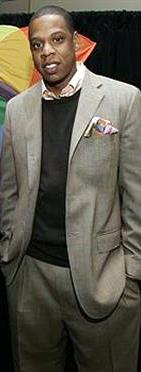
Jay-Z, 2010 winner

- Oprah Winfrey, media mogul
- Clarence Otis Jr., chief executive officer of Darden Restaurants
- Ephren W. Taylor, chief executive officer of City Capital Corporations
- Janice Bryant Howroyd, entrepreneur
- Ralph Gilles, president and CEO Dodge Brand
- Jamail Larkins, chief executive officer of Ascension Aircraft
- Carla Harris, managing director in Global Capital Markets at Morgan Stanley
- Regina Benjamin, U.S. Surgeon General

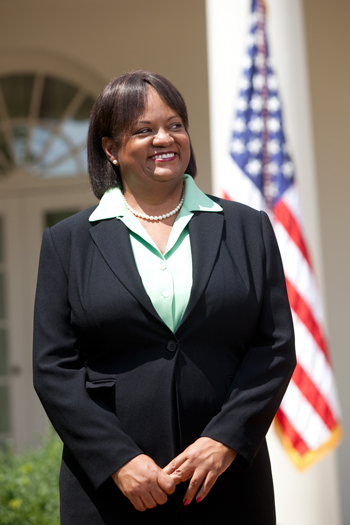
Regina Benjamin, 2010 winner

- Will Allen, chief executive officer of Growing Power
- Otis Brawley, chief medical officer of American Cancer Society
- Kathie-Ann Joseph, surgeon and breast cancer researcher/activist
- Lisa Cooper, professor at Johns Hopkins Bloomberg School of Public Health
- Helene Gayle, president and CEO of CARE USA
- Seun Adebiyi, Olympic hopeful
- Satira Streeter, clinical psychologist
- Treena Livingston Arinzeh, biomedical engineer
- Risa Lavisso-Mourey, president and CEO of the Robert Wood Johnson Foundation
- Bakari Sellers, Democratic member of South Carolina House of Representatives
- Anthony Woods, former Democratic candidate for U.S. Congress in California
- Artur Davis, Democratic member of the United States House of Representatives

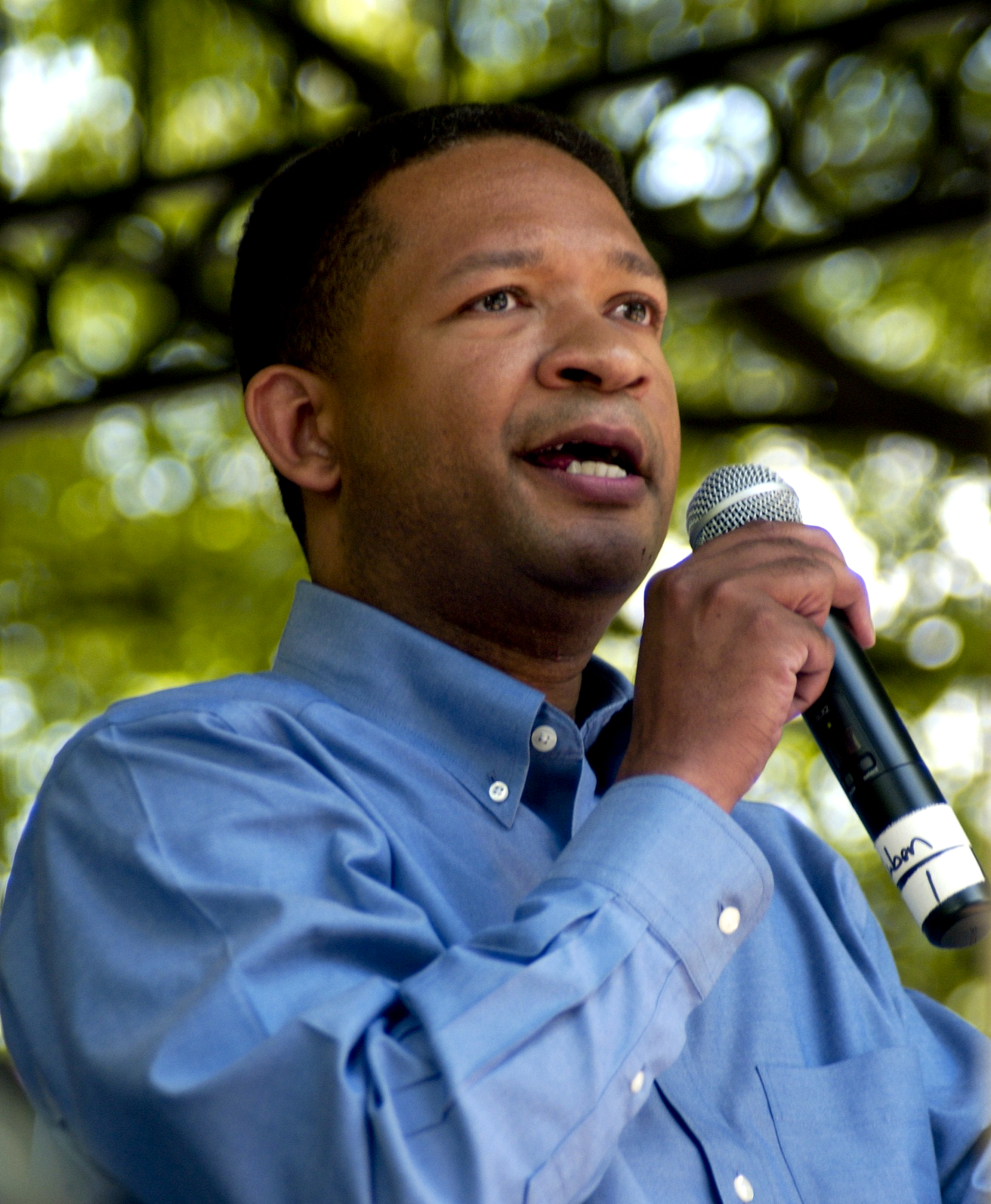
Artur Davis, 2010 winner

- Melody Barnes, White House Director of the Domestic Policy Council
- Deval Patrick, Democratic Governor of Massachusetts
- Kamala Harris, District Attorney of San Francisco
- Eric Holder, U.S. Attorney General
- Vernon Parker, Republican mayor of Paradise Valley, Arizona
- Stephanie Rawlings-Blake, mayor of Baltimore, Maryland
- Kevin Johnson, mayor of Sacramento
- Beyoncé Knowles, singer

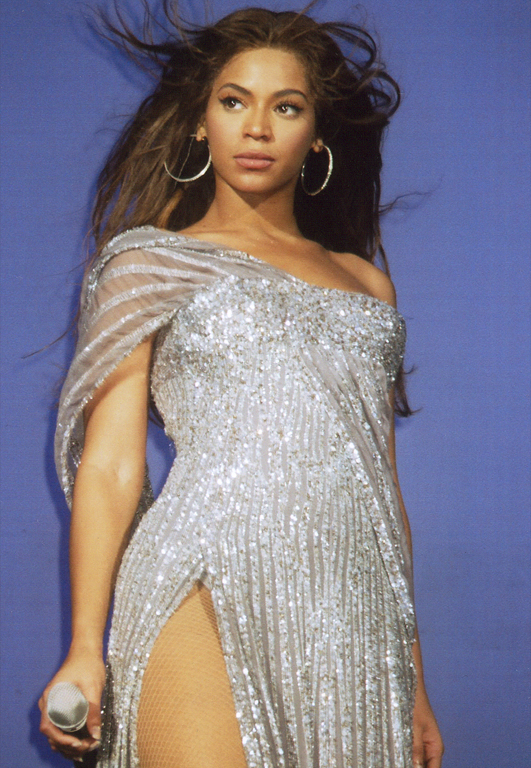
Beyonce, 2010 winner

- Shonda Rimes, executive producer of Grey's Anatomy and Private Practice
- Will.i.am, co-founder of Black Eyed Peas, musician and producer
- Drake, rapper
- Chiwetel Ejiofor, actor
- Gina Prince-Bythewood, film director
- Charles King, Hollywood agent
- Darius Rucker, musician and country singer; formerly of Hootie & the Blowfish
- Mary J. Blige, singer; anti-domestic violence activist
- Mo'Nique, actress and comedian
- Jason Moran, jazz musician and music historian
- Kara Walker, artist
- Malcolm Gladwell, author of The Tipping Point

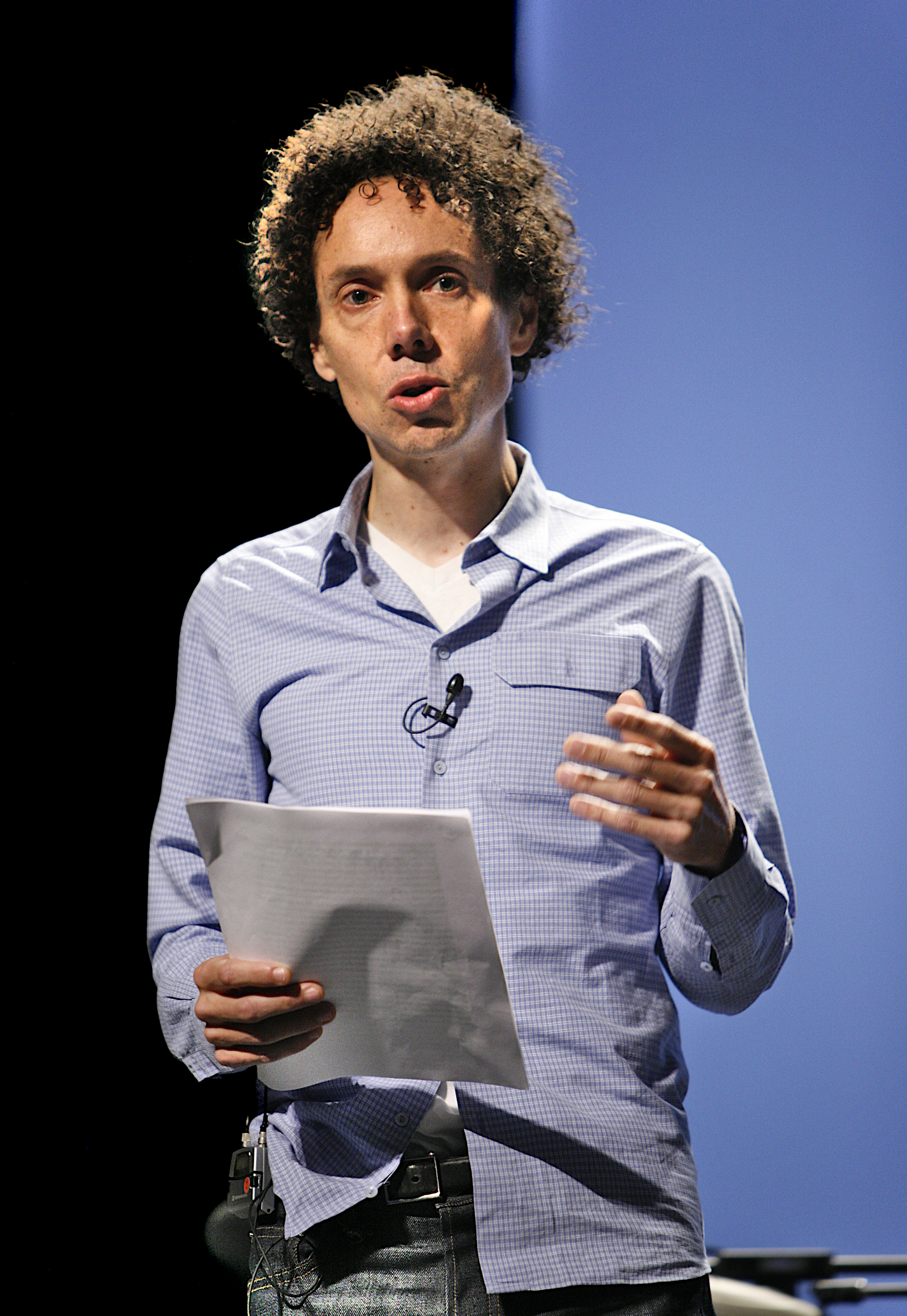
Malcolm Gladwell, 2010 winner

- Bill T. Jones, dancer and director of Broadway's FELA!
- Wynton Marsalis, jazz musician
- Lynn Nottage, Pulitzer Prize-winning playwright
- Kadir Nelson, children's book illustrator
- Kehinde Wiley, painter
- Darin Atwater, composer/conductor
- Jessica Care Moore, poet, actor, publisher
- Charles Bolden, NASA Administrator; former space shuttle commander
- Tony Hansberry, The Next Doogie Howser, created a breakthrough surgical stitch
- Derrick Pitts, chief astronomer at the Franklin Institute
- Lisa P. Jackson, administrator of the Environmental Protection Agency
- James McLurkin, electrical engineer and robot specialist
- Jerome Ringo, president of the Apollo Alliance
- Beverly Wright, head of the Deep South Center for Environmental Justice
- Robert Bullard, author and environmentalist
- Shelton Johnson, park ranger at Yosemite National Park
- Agnes A. Day, associate professor of microbiology at Howard University
- Shani Davis, Olympic speed skater
- Michael Hill, general manager of the Florida Marlins baseball team
- James Stewart Jr., champion motocross driver
- Evander Kane, member of the Atlanta Thrashers NHL team
- LeBron James, member of the Cleveland Cavaliers NBA team
- Adrian Peterson, member of the Minnesota Vikings NFL team
- Allyson Felix, Olympic track and field athlete
- Candace Parker, member of the Los Angeles Sparks WNBA basketball team
- Serena Williams, professional tennis player
- Cheyenne Woods, golfer
- Wyclef Jean, musician and philanthropist
- Craig Watkins, Dallas District Attorney
- Cory Booker, mayor of Newark, New Jersey
- Richard Buery Jr., president and chief executive officer of Children's Aid Society in New York
- Alysa Stanton, first female African-American rabbi
- Majora Carter, environmental justice advocate
- Shawna Rochelle Kimbrell, first African-American female fighter pilot in the U.S. Air Force
- Kari Fulton, national campus campaign coordinator for the Environmental Justice and Climate Change Initiative
- Yolanda Wimberly, assistant professor of clinical pediatrics, Morehouse School of Medicine in Atlanta, Georgia
- Joshua DuBois, minister and head of the White House Office for Faith Based and Neighborhood Partnerships
- Tyra Banks, model and media entrepreneur

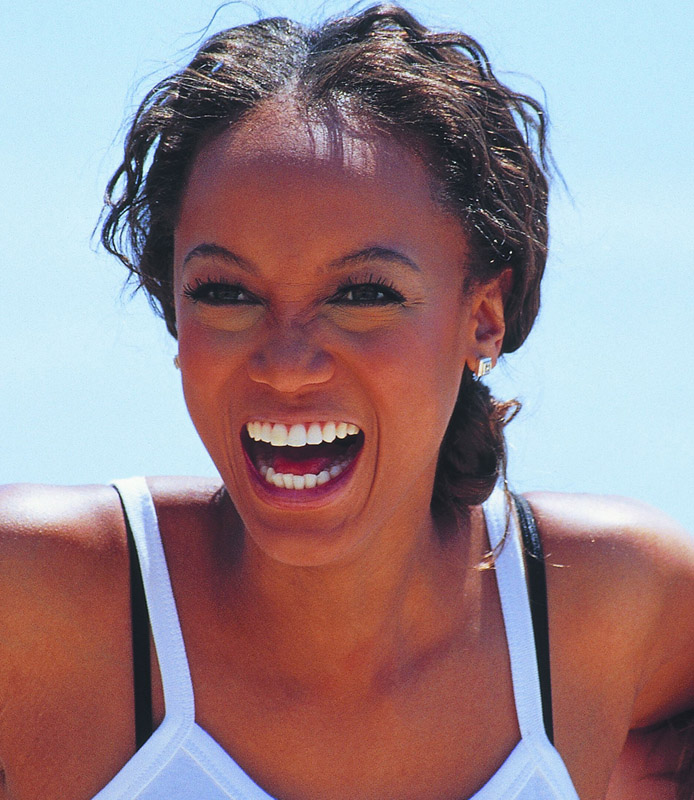
Tyra Banks, 2010 winner

- Tyler Perry, producer/director
- Christina Norman, chief executive officer of OprahWomensNetwork (OWN)
- Fred Mwangaguhunga, founder of Meditakeout.com
- Byron Pitts, correspondent for CBS News' 60 Minutes
- Roland Martin, journalist
- Steve Harvey Radio host, author
- David Drummond, SVP of corporate development and chief legal officer of Google
- Mary Spio, co-founder of Gen2MEDIA and digital media expert
- Mara Schiavocampo, NBC Nightly News digital correspondent
- Teresa King, first female commander at U.S. Army's Drill Sgt. School
- Freeman A. Hrabowski III, president of University of Maryland; education expert
- Spirit Trickey, daughter of one of Little Rock 9, park ranger at Central High School Visitor Center
- Barrington Irving, pilot; founder of Experience Aviation
- Roland Fryer, professor of economics at Harvard University
- Omo Moses, founder and executive director of Young Peoples Project
- Shirley Ann Jackson, president of Rensselaer Polytechnic Institute
- Tim King, founder of Urban Prep Charter Academy for Young Men in Chicago
- Ashanti Johnson, assistant professor of Chemical Oceanography at College of Marine Science in St. Petersburg, FL
- John Jackson, president and CEO of The Schott Foundation for Public Education
