= Terry Williams =

Terry Williams may refer to:

== Sports ==
=== Gridiron football ===
- Terrance Williams (born 1989), American football wide receiver
- Terry Williams (defensive back) (born 1965), American former football defensive back
- Terry Williams (running back) (born 1992), American football running back in Canada
- Terry Williams (wide receiver) (born 1996), American football wide receiver in Canada

=== Other sports ===
- Terrence Williams (born 1987), American basketball player
- Terry Williams (footballer) (born 1966), English former professional footballer
- Terry Williams (sprinter) (born 1968), English sprinter
- Terrence Williams (sprinter) (born 1978), American sprinter, winner of the 1999 4 × 400 meter relay at the NCAA Division I Outdoor Track and Field Championships
- Terri Williams (born 1969), American basketball coach

== Others ==
- J. Terry Williams (1930–2015), American film editor
- Terry Williams (musician) (born 1947), American singer-songwriter and guitarist
- Terry Williams (drummer) (born 1948), Welsh rock drummer
- Terrie Williams (born 1954), American author
- Terrie Williams (scientist), American marine biologist and ecophysiologist
- Terry Lee Williams (born 1950), American politician
- Terry Tempest Williams (born 1955), American author, naturalist, and environmental activist
- Terry Williams (condemned prisoner) (born 1968), American convicted murderer sentenced to death
- Terry Williams (politician), member of the Vermont Senate

== Fictional characters ==
- Terry Williams (Hollyoaks), in the UK soap opera Hollyoaks, played by Ian Puleston-Davies

== See also ==
- Disappearances of Terrance Williams and Felipe Santos
