= Keija Minor =

American lawyer and magazine editor (born 1972)

- Born: April 24, 1972 (age 54)
- Education: University of Massachusetts Amherst (BA); Howard University (JD)
- Occupation: Magazine editor

Keija C. Minor (born April 24, 1972) is an African-American magazine editor and former lawyer. From 2012 to 2017, she was editor-in-chief of Condé Nast weddings magazine Brides, becoming the first African-American to hold the editor-in-chief title at Condé Nast.

== Early life ==
Minor grew up in Harvard, Massachusetts, and attended the University of Massachusetts-Amherst, then Howard University Law School, where she graduated in 1999.

== Career ==
Minor practiced corporate law for four years before moving to magazines, first joining Travel Savvy where she eventually became editor-in-chief. She also worked for Los Angeles Confidential, then as editor-in-chief of Gotham from 2005 to 2007 and Uptown (2008 to 2011) before joining Condé Nast. Minor became executive editor of Brides, the world's largest weddings publication, in 2011, then acting editor-in-chief when previous editor-in-chief Anna Fulenwider moved to Marie Claire; the promotion became permanent in November 2012. This made Minor the first African-American to hold the editor-in-chief title in Condé Nast's then-103-year history. At Brides, Minor oversaw the expansion of the publication into commercial endeavors, including making editors from the magazine available for hire as private consultants to individual brides.

In 2013, The Grio named Minor to its Grio 100 list, citing her "breaking Conde Nast's color barrier at Brides."

Minor resigned from Condé Nast in 2017.
