= Project Brotherhood =

Project Brotherhood - free health clinic

Project Brotherhood's logo

Project Brotherhood is a health clinic focused on using community outreach and preventive education to meet the needs and improve the health of African American men in the Woodlawn area on the south side of Chicago, Illinois. The clinic is operated by a combination of staff, volunteers, and interns and hosts a variety of free services for members of the community.

== Services ==
=== Social Support Group ===
Project Brotherhood offers a weekly social support group facilitated by a licensed social worker. The conversation in these groups can range from current politics, cancer prevention tips, or other topics brought up by the group. During the group, the social worker is available to assist participants with social services and a doctor is on staff to deal with medical concerns. Clients are also able to receive help in terms of fatherhood classes, resume writing, preventive health education, and other services.

A course on meditative Qigong is offered concurrently with the weekly support group.

=== Health Clinic ===
The clinic is hosted in the Woodlawn Health Center and is staffed by paid and volunteer doctor's who are able to provide various medical services. These services range from pre-employment physicals to health checkups to treatment of chronic conditions.

=== Barbershop ===
Many African American men say that they avoid health clinics due to unkempt appearance, so Project Brotherhood staffs a barber to give haircuts and talk to men about health issues ranging from prostate cancer to HIV.

== Recognition ==
=== Television ===
Project Brotherhood was featured on "Black in America", a CNN documentary focusing on various topics and issues relating to the African American population in the United States. In "BIA 2", Project Brotherhood was presented as one of America's pioneers in terms of African American health.

=== White House visit ===
The staff of Project Brotherhood were invited to the White House to speak on a panel about black men's health and the HIV epidemic in the African American community. During the panel discussion, Dr. David Malbranche of Emory University stated his belief that Project Brotherhood is a model that should be replicated across the country.
