= Amanda Spann =

Amanda Spann is an American marketing consultant and app entrepreneur, known for creating tech businesses to support and engage with the Black tech community.

== Early life and education ==
Spann is a graduate of Florida State University and Georgetown University.

== Career ==
Alongside her partner Kat Calvin, Spann co-founded Blerdology: The Science of Black Nerds, a social platform that unites the black tech community. Initially known as Black Girls Hack, Blerdology is tailored towards the African American community and encourages engagement from tech enthusiasts through events such as hackathons. The first Blerdology hackathon was held in November 2012 in Atlanta, Georgia and consisted of fifty black tech enthusiasts competing to create mobile apps.

Spann serves as the communications and content manager for the IBM Cloud Category.

Spann is the co-founder of TibHub, a platform designed for entrepreneurs in the African diaspora. Founded in 2014, TipHub serves as a community for sharing ideas and innovations, empowering its members to collaborate and succeed in their ventures. Annually, Tibhup hosts an annual US-based residency program, called the Diaspora Demo Day, in which 14 individuals from the African Diaspora are provided with mentorship and support for their start-up businesses.

Another contribution of Spann's is Happii, an initiative that provides young entrepreneurs with accessible tools and support they need to start and grow their businesses effectively. Happii is divided into several business verticals, which includes products like TipOff App, CultureCrush App, and DubbleTap.com, online coaching, and e-learning and produce development. Spann is also known for her involvement with AfriDate, a dating app specifically designed for African American singles, connecting users through shared ethnicity and nationality.

Spann is recognized as a key partner in an App Accelerator program that collaborates with Historically Black Colleges and Universities (HBCUs), such as Clark Atlanta University. The App Accelerator program provides a framework to first time app building for non-technical individuals. With the support of Clark Atlanta University, along with PNC Back, The App Accelerator program hosts a 15-week program designed for non-technical individuals, called Idea to App, which allows them to bring their app ideas to fruition. This initiative aims to foster innovation and entrepreneurship within the HBCU community, enhancing access to technology and business development opportunities for underrepresented founders.
