= Treena Arinzeh =

American biomedical engineer

- Born: Treena Livingston Arinzeh; 1970 (age 55–56); Cherry Hill, New Jersey, US
- Education: Rutgers University, Johns Hopkins University, University of Pennsylvania
- Occupation: Biomedical Engineer
- Employer: Columbia University
- Known for: Stem cell therapy research

Treena Livingston Arinzeh (born 1970) is an American biomedical engineer and academic.

She is professor of biomedical engineering at Columbia University, joining in 2022. She was formerly a Distinguished Professor in Biomedical Engineering at the New Jersey Institute of Technology in Newark, New Jersey. She is known for her research on adult stem-cell therapy.

== Early life and education ==
Arinzeh was born in 1970 and raised in Cherry Hill, New Jersey. She became interested in science by conducting imaginary experiments in the kitchen with her mother, who was a home economics teacher. She was encouraged to pursue a STEM career by her high school physics teacher.

Arinzeh studied Mechanical Engineering at Rutgers University, receiving a B.S. in 1992. She earned a M.S.E. in biomedical engineering from Johns Hopkins University in 1994. She continued her graduate studies at the University of Pennsylvania, completing a PhD in Biomedical Engineering in 1999.

== Research and career ==
Arinzeh worked for Baltimore, Maryland-based Osiris Therapeutics as a product development engineer. In 2001, she returned to academia and started working at the New Jersey Institute of Technology (NJIT) in Newark, New Jersey, where she founded the first Tissue Engineering and Applied Biomaterials Laboratory at NJIT in the fall of 2001. She was at NJIT until 2022 as a Distinguished Professor of Biomedical Engineering. She joined Columbia University as a Professor in Biomedical Engineering in 2022.

Her current research focuses on systematic studies of the effect of biomaterial properties on stem cell differentiation. She is known for discovering that mixing stem cells with scaffolding (Note: Here a "scaffold" is a three-dimensional structure (may be porous), seeded with cells and implanted into a tissue.) allows regeneration of bone growth and the repair of tissue damage.

She discovered that one person's stem cells could be implanted in another person without causing an adverse immune response. In 2018, she received an QED award to work on the recovery time and cost patients experience after bone grafting procedures.

She was nominated by the Governor of Connecticut to the Connecticut Stem Cell Research Advisory Committee.

She is a fellow of the American Institute for Medical and Biological Engineering (AIMBE), the Biomedical Engineering Society (BMES)., and the National Academy of Inventors (NAI).

She is a co-PI of the NSF Science and Technology Center on Engineering Mechano-Biology, which is a multi-institutional center with the University of Pennsylvania and Washington University in St. Louis.

In addition, Arinzeh is a mentor in the ACS Project Seeds program supported by the American Chemical Society. Every summer, she mentors high school students to learn about engineering and her research.

In 2018, Arinzeh was selected to be a Judge for Nature scientific journal's newly created Innovating Science Panel Award.

Her accomplishments have been highlighted in various newspaper articles, journals, Black Issues in Higher Education, and Essence Magazine. She has been recognized in a Congressional Record by the U.S House of Representatives.

== Awards ==
- 2018: QED Award recipient
- 2018: George Bugliarello Prize winner
- 2010: Grio Awards recipient
- 2004: Presidential Early Career Award for Scientists and Engineers recipient
- 2003: Faculty Early Career Development Award recipient, awarded by the National Science Foundation

== Select publications ==
- 2017: Three-dimensional piezoelectric fibrous scaffolds selectively promote mesenchymal stem cell differentiation. Biomaterials.
- 2015: The effect of PVDF-TrFE scaffolds on stem cell derived cardiovascular cells. Biotechnology & Bioengineering.
- 2015: An investigation of common crosslinking agents on the stability of electrospun collagen scaffolds. Journal of Biomedical Materials Research.
- 2013: Examining the formulation of emulsion electrospinning for improving the release of bioactive proteins from electrospun fibers. Journal of Biomedical Materials Research.
- 2005: "A comparative study of biphasic calcium phosphate ceramics for human mesenchymal stem-cell-induced bone formation" Biomaterials.
