= Angela Benton =

American businesswoman (born 1981)

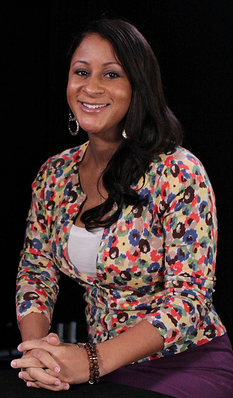
- Born: May 22, 1981 (age 45); Chicago, Illinois, United States
- Occupations: Essayist, writer, technologist, entrepreneur
- Years active: 2007–present
- Known for: Founder of NewME

Angela Benton (born May 22, 1981) is an American essayist, writer, and technologist whose work explores how artificial intelligence, data, and technology are reshaping power, ownership, and human agency.

Benton is the founder of NewME, the first startup accelerator for minorities globally, and former CEO of Streamlytics, a data platform focused on ethical, consumer-powered data and the democratization of data ownership. The company has been recognized in Business Insider's list of startups to watch.

Benton has received numerous accolades for her work, including recognition as one of Goldman Sachs' 100 Most Intriguing Entrepreneurs, Fast Company's Most Influential Women In Technology, and Business Insider's 25 Most Influential African-Americans in Technology. Benton has been featured in numerous national and international media outlets including CNN's award-winning documentary series by Soledad O'Brien, Black in America: The New Promised Land: Silicon Valley MSNBC, Bloomberg Television, Inc, Forbes, Good Morning America, and the Wall Street Journal, where she was a featured essayist for the paper's 125th Anniversary edition on "The Future of Entrepreneurship".

== Career ==
=== Black Web 2.0 ===
Benton launched Black Web 2.0 in August 2007. It is said that the site was launched out of her frustration to find information on what Blacks were doing in technology both from an entrepreneurial/startup and corporate perspective. The site quickly gain community amongst Black digerati and early adopters, giving them a place to be heard and featured. Markus Robinson, a partner in the site and its COO until 2010, was a key figure in growing the platform. In the early days of Black Web 2.0 Benton served as the editor and main writer for the site, along with Robinson, and used the platform to feature and discuss key topics in Black Culture, technology, and where the two intersected. The duo often critiqued products and the digital strategies of African-American media businesses and forecasted trends in the arena, as such they quickly became the leading experts in the space.

=== NewME accelerator ===
In June 2011 Benton launched the first NewME accelerator cohort in Silicon Valley. Key figures that participated in the program as mentors, speakers, or supporters included some of the technology industry's elite; Mitch Kapor, Ben Horowitz, Vivek Wadhwa, Google, Twitter, Andreessen Horowitz, Facebook et al. The program was largely responsible for being a catalyst for elevating the conversation around diversity in the technology industry for both ethnic minorities and women. Some alumni of NewME went on to become venture capitalist themselves at Kapor Capital, Andreessen Horowitz, and TEDco. Under her leadership the company helped hundreds of minority companies raise over $47 million in venture capital funding. Benton sold NewME in December 2018.

=== CNN's Black in America & Silicon Valley's Race Problem ===
The NewME Accelerator's inaugural class was featured on CNN's fourth installment of Black in America reported by award-winning journalist Soledad O'Brien. Benton was featured as one of the primary subjects in the documentary. The documentary, whose focus was on chronicling the stories of 8 NewME Accelerator participants that traveled to Silicon Valley to work on their startups, catapulted the NewME Accelerator to a national stage and sparked a heated industry debate on the lack of minorities in technology. At the height of the debate tech maven Michael Arrington, known for off color comments, became a target for out lash on the topic.

=== Streamlytics ===
Benton founded Streamlytics, a next generation data ecosystem that provides ethical, human powered data, in 2018 to democratize data collection. The company is the market leader for an emerging data category, coined community driven data, which places data ownership into the hands of the consumers that create it. Streamlytics has a specific focus on providing data that better reflects the usage of people of color and providing financial compensation for users that opt to share their data. The company's investors include Issa Rae and The Savannah College of Art and Design.

Benton has continued to be featured in coverage related to entrepreneurship, diversity in technology, and data ownership. In 2021, Axios profiled the 10-year anniversary of NewME and its impact on expanding access for underrepresented founders. Her work on Streamlytics and data ownership has also been featured in Essence, highlighting her focus on ethical data use and artificial intelligence.

=== Other ===
Angela Benton is a breast cancer survivor and advocate for health and wellness as it relates to entrepreneurship. She authored REVIVAL in 2017 after her cancer diagnosis.

== Writing and thought leadership ==
Benton's writing focuses on the intersection of artificial intelligence, data, and power, with particular emphasis on how emerging technologies reshape ownership, labor, and human agency.

Her work has been published in outlets including Wired, The Hill, and The Wall Street Journal, where she has written on topics such as data equity, artificial intelligence, and the future of entrepreneurship.

Benton has also appeared in broadcast media discussing artificial intelligence and its societal implications. In 2023, she was a guest on The Tamron Hall Show, where she discussed the opportunities and risks of artificial intelligence, including emerging concerns around scams and misuse of the technology.

In addition to her published work, Benton has developed a body of independent essays exploring themes such as data ownership, digital labor, and the cultural implications of artificial intelligence.

== Selected works ==
=== Selected essays ===
- "An AI-Run World Needs to Better Reflect People of Color," Wired (2019)
- "How We Can Build an Ethical Data Future," The Hill (2021)
- "Angela Benton on the Future of Entrepreneurship," The Wall Street Journal (2014)

=== Books ===
- Revival: How I Rebuilt a Life for Longevity After Cancer, Burnout, and Heartbreak (2017)

== Influence and accomplishments ==
- Fast Company Magazine's Most Influential Women in Technology, 2010
- Minority Media and Telecommunications Council (MMTC) Hall of Fame, 2010
- National Urban League Woman of Power honoree, 2010
- Ebony Magazine's Power 150; 2011, 2012
- 40 Women of Power under 40, Black Enterprise, 2012
- TheRoot 100: 2010, 2011, 2012
- TheGrio100, 2012
- Digital Vanguard Award, Women Interactive at Spelman University
- Frost & Sullivan Innovator honoree, 2012
- 25 Most Influential African-Americans in Technology, Business Insider, 2013
- "100 Most Intriguing Entrepreneurs", Goldman Sachs, 2013
- The New Guard: 50 Women Who Rule, Marie Claire, November 2013
- Business Insiders' 46 Most Important African Americans In Technology, April 2014
- Marie Claire's 20 Women Changing The Ratio, September 2014
- BET, Tech Maven Award, July 2018
- Adweek, 2018 Power 100
- Adweek, 2020 Women Trailblazers, July 2020
- Fast Company, Most Creative People in Business, August 2020
- Inc, Female Founders 100, October 2020

== Philanthropy ==
Benton traveled to Malawi in 2017 to support local villages with solar powered electricity through a micro fund and partnership established with Kuyere!, a project dedicated to providing solar electricity to the poorest rural households in Africa. Her investment powered 10 villages in Malawi. She produced a documentary series titled, Venture, on her time there.

== Filmography ==
Television and film roles
Year	Title	Role	Notes
2011	Black in America	Herself	Episode: "Silicon Valley: The New Promised Land"
2017	Sally Hansen "Shetopia" Commercial	Herself	
2017	Queen Boss	Herself/Guest Judge	1 Episode

== Bibliography ==
- Benton, Angela (2017). Revival: How I Rebuilt a Life for Longevity After Cancer, Burnout, and Heartbreak. Angela Benton, Inc. ISBN 978-0998640822
