= Carolyn McCaskill =

American academic

- Born: Mobile, Alabama, U.S.
- Education: Alabama School for the Deaf in Talladega, Alabama; B.A. degree in Psychology from Gallaudet University; M.A. degree in counseling with the deaf from Gallaudet University; Ph.D. in Administration and Supervision from Gallaudet University
- Occupations: ASL & Deaf Studies Professor at Gallaudet University
- Children: Jamel McCaskill
- Parent: Janie McCaskill

Carolyn McCaskill is a deaf African-American counselor and professor. She has been teaching at Gallaudet University since 1996, currently holds the position of professor in the ASL and Deaf Studies Department, and since 2005, she is the Coordinator of the Deaf Studies Program.

== Education ==
PhD, Gallaudet University, Special Education Administration & Supervision (2005) M.A., Counseling of the Deaf (1979) B.A., Psychology-Social Work (1977)

Prior to college, McCaskill attended and graduated of the Alabama School for the Deaf in Talladega, Alabama.

== Career ==
McCaskill served as a counselor at the Model Secondary School for the Deaf, at the Houston Community College System, and as a career counselor at Gallaudet University. She was the Coordinator of Minority Achievement and Multicultural Program for Pre-college Programs at Gallaudet University.

== Seminars, workshops, and publications ==
- See http://www.nbda.org/spotlight/dr.-carolyn-mccaskill for a list of seminars
- co-author of "The Hidden Treasure of Black ASL" (2011)

== Personal life ==
McCaskill grew up in the projects in Mobile, Alabama.

As of 2025, McCaskill lives in Washington D.C..

== Awards ==
- Crowned Miss Gallaudet 1976
- Deaf Humanitarian Award from the National Action Network (NAN)
- 2013 Grio Award
- Diversity Fellows in the Provost office in 2006
- Thomas and Julia Mayes Award 2005
- Mobile, Alabama, presented a proclamation honoring McCaskill's championing Black Deaf education, civil rights, and cultural preservation in 2025
