= Black in America =

American television series

Black In America is a multi-part series of documentaries hosted by reporter Soledad O'Brien on CNN that first aired on July 23, 2008. The series is about various issues regarding blacks (African-Americans), which includes panel discussions on issues facing the black community and a look at the culture of black families in America, men, and women.

It features exclusive commentary by music mogul Russell Simmons, Grammy Award-winning rapper Lupe Fiasco, comedian D.L. Hughley, award-winning filmmaker Spike Lee, and actress/comedian Whoopi Goldberg.

The program has been extremely successful. CNN.com's interactive section for "Black In America" garnered over 2.4 million page views. The "Black In America" iReport.com assignment received over 1,000 submissions. Several viewers of the first episode were so inspired by the program that they launched BlackInAmerica.com, an online community and social network for black Americans who want to address the issues and challenges of Black America.

The success of the program also led to CNN producing additional episodes and making it a series. The second episode, "Black in America 2", premiered on July 22, 2009, and tells the story of "Journey For Change", a youth empowerment program funded and led by activist Malaak Compton-Rock. "Journey For Change" is a yearlong program that works with 30 teenagers selected from the community of Bushwick in Brooklyn, New York to be "global ambassadors" through community service and fundraising projects. The program starts off with a 2-week trip to South Africa where kids who are used to being on the receiving end of aid are exposed to an environment where they are the privileged and they are the ones who are giving to the needy.

On September 2, 2008, the "CNN Presents: Black in America" documentary was made available for sale on Amazon.com and other retailers. It is also available through iTunes for download.

Since 2010, voice actor Kareem Taylor has been the announcer of the "Black in America" commercial campaign.

== Parts of series ==
- The Black Woman and Family: First aired on July 23, 2008; Total running time: 2 hours.

An exploration of the varied experiences of black women and families investigates the disturbing statistics of single parenthood, racial disparities between students and the devastating toll of STDs/HIV/AIDS. CNN also reports on the progress of Black women in the workplace and the status of the Black middle class.

- The Black Man: First aired on July 24, 2008; Total running time: 2 hours.

Through the personal stories of graduates of the 1968 class of Little Rock Central High School and their sons and grandsons, CNN explores the state of Black men in America. The network dispels the myths and examines the disparities between blacks and whites in education, career, economic achievement and the devastating rates of Black male incarceration.

Black in America: Today's Pioneers: First aired July 22, 2009 at 8pm & 11pm ET/PT. Total running time: 2 hours.

For the second evening of CNN's Black in America 2, anchor and special correspondent Soledad O'Brien reports on how community organizers across the country are creating progress and improvements at a local level. From a Chicago barbershop where African-American men are encouraged to seek routine medical check-ups; to Tyler Perry, an actor, director and playwright, whose life's journey has led him from homelessness to becoming a filmmaker and television producer who is creating opportunities for others; to the Black Marriage Day project which works with couples in 300 cities to help develop strong, healthy families; these are the programs and progress of people working in ways large and small to make a difference.

Black in America: Tomorrow's Leaders: First aired July 23, 2009 at 8pm & 11pm ET/PT. Total running time: 2 hours.

For the debut evening of CNN's Black in America 2, anchor and special correspondent Soledad O'Brien focuses on solutions aimed at developing African-American leaders of tomorrow. John Rice's Management Leadership for Tomorrow program has been instrumental in establishing black professionals in positions of power and influence in America's largest companies. O'Brien also reports on programs aimed at creating opportunities for the next generation of youth leadership. Malaak Compton-Rock's Journey for Change offers teenagers from inner-city schools the opportunity to see the world and develop self-confidence; and Steve Perry, Ed.D.'s, Capital Preparatory Magnet School creates opportunities for leadership and academic excellence by preparing young, black students for college with "tough love."

Almighty Debt: A CNN Black in America Special: First aired October 21, 2010. Total running time: 2 hours.

Every leading indicator - unemployment, income, wealth, educational attainment, home ownership and foreclosures - demonstrates that the African-American financial foundation is crumbling at rates that are comparatively worse than other segments of the U.S. population. Reported by anchor and special correspondent Soledad O'Brien, and told through experiences of members of the First Baptist Church of Lincoln Gardens (FBCLG) in New Jersey, the first 90-minutes of this special explores how an institution central to African-American communities for generations is helping its 7,000 parishioners survive the worst financial crisis since the Great Depression. The church's community development corporation struggles to help desperate homeowners save their homes from foreclosure and the unemployed find work. The youth ministry assists students with financial aid applications. Following the documentary, a town hall discussion moderated by O'Brien features founder and senior pastor Bishop T.D. Jakes, clinical social worker and public relations executive Terrie Williams, syndicated columnist Michelle Singletary, FBCLG senior pastor Rev. Dr. DeForest Soaries, pollster Cornell Belcher and others.

Black in America: The New Promised Land – Silicon Valley: First aired November 13, 2011.

While much of the country struggles to emerge from a recession, California's Silicon Valley is booming, and technology companies like Facebook, Skype, and Apple are seeing their valuations soar. CNN anchor and special correspondent Soledad O'Brien reports that the ownership of this digital bloom is mostly young, white, and male. For her fourth Black in America documentary, O'Brien asks why, according to industry analyst CB Insights, less than one percent of all venture capital money went to digital startups with African-American founders in 2010 – and she profiles a unique, technology-focused "accelerator" developed to help African-American digital entrepreneurs secure funding to establish their businesses.

Who is Black in America?: First aired December 9, 2012.

The fifth installment in the series focuses on colorism and racial identity. In today's United States, is being black determined by the color of your skin, by your family, by what society says or something else? The documentary follows the story of 2 young Philadelphia poets as they explore their racial identity through workshops conducted by their mentor, Perry "Vision" Divirgilio of Philly Youth Poetry Movement. The program examines how color affects identity. Scholar Yaba Blay analyzes the nuances of racial identity and the influences of skin color.

== Controversy and criticism ==
Syndicated columnist Kam Williams harshly criticized the series in a widely circulated DVD review, saying that it was full of "infuriating mistakes". One part of his review read: "My biggest overall problem had to do with the program's periodic factual inaccuracies, such as when [Soledad] O'Brien refers to the riot which erupted in L.A. after the Rodney King decision as the most deadly U.S. riot in 100 years. She conveniently ignores other more bloody incidents like the Tulsa Race Riot of 1921 when over 300 blacks were slaughtered by white militiamen. What's up with that?"

Other columnists, such as Askia Muhammad from the Final Call, also criticized the series calling it "a faulty portrait". One part of his column read: "CNN was able with this report to make what many Black men had rejected as the "American Nightmare," appear now to be the "New American Dream."

On the contrary, The Washington Post columnist Tom Shales, called it an "expressive portrait". He said that CNN turned ordinary stories into an "extraordinary series." His column reads: "[The series] looms as a tremendous accomplishment for O'Brien and for the many producers, editors and crew members who poured themselves into it. And if no good comes of it, it won't be their fault."

Author PJ Coble, labeled the original work "a poor attempt to conceptualize in a two-day documentary a history of a people and a race".

Raymond Leon Roker, a columnist for The Huffington Post, applauded CNN for taking the chance with such a controversial program. "This is never easy, as you're bound to misfire on all sides in some ways," he says. "To its credit, the series did give airtime to topics rarely discussed outside the barber/beauty shops, campuses and black kitchen tables of America."

== Ratings ==
The two-part documentary on Black men, women, and families that aired on July 23–24, 2008 became one of CNN's most watched programs, drawing an average of 2.6 million viewers and outperforming the network's year-to-date averages for 9-11 p.m. by double and triple digits. The series was promoted through an extensive advertising campaign that included television, radio, print, and online promotions. A repeat airing drew 683,000 viewers (294,000 in the 35-64 demo) on 2/25/09.
