= Kat Calvin =

African-American activist, entrepreneur and author

- Education: Mount Holyoke College University of Michigan Law School
- Known for: Founder of Spread the Vote and Project ID Co-Founder of Blerdology Founder Character's Closet First Hackathon Targeting African-Americans American Identity in Crisis: Notes from an Accidental Activist. Amistad, 2023
- Notable work: Time Magazine 16 People and Groups Fighting for a More Equal America 2018 Fast Company 100 Most Creative People in Business The Grio 100 Business Insider 30 Under 30
- Website: www.katcalvin.com

Kat Calvin is an American activist, businesswoman and author. She is the founder of Spread the Vote and Project ID and the Co-founder of Blerdology. Calvin's organization supports Americans to obtain their IDs for housing, jobs, and voting. Additionally, Calvin advocates for advanced minority representation in the STEM field.

== Early life and education ==
Calvin's parents served full-time in the United States Armed Forces. She lived in Seattle and Sierra Vista, Arizona. In 2005, Calvin graduated from Mount Holyoke College with a bachelor's in theater. From 2007 to 2010 Calvin attended the University of Michigan Law School, receiving her doctorate.

== Career ==
Kat Calvin, Amanda Spann and Janelle Jolley created the hackathon series "Black Girls Hack" exclusively for black girls, becoming the first non-profit hackathon catering to the African-American community. This hackathon was a network of leading tech startups created and financed by black women.

Calvin aimed to spark interest in young girls of color fostering a comprehensive national workforce for the tech industry. Black Girls Hack allows girls of color to create solutions for evolving digital problems.Before the second hackathon event, Janelle Jolley departed from her position with Black Girls Hack as it went into a rebranding/reorganization stage creating Blerdology: The Science of Black Nerds to reach a wider spectrum of participants and sponsorships to celebrate the Black Tech community.

The first Blerdology hackathon in November 2013, introduced fifty developers and coders to create a mobile application with some of the proceeds from the event going to Black Girls Code, to advance young black girls across America in their pursuit of computer programming.

Blerdology sought out second-tier markets such as Newark and Detroit for people of color interested in technology while connecting with Rutgers Business School to host its second hackathon event. Blerdology generated a hashtag #BlackHack to promote its new partnership with Rutgers Business School.

Calvin has created other entrepreneurial enterprises to improve the relationship between African Americans and the voting community, so in 2017, Calvin founded the non-profit organization Spread the Vote. Spread the Vote's mission is to close the gap between registered voters and voter turnout by helping them get photo IDs monetarily in states that require identification to vote. Spread the Vote was awarded a grant from New Media Ventures, which is a network of investors that fund media and tech startups.

Calvin created two other satellite political non-profits under the Spread the Vote organization. Project ID and Project ID Action Fund seek to educate further and empower its voters through laws and policies. Project ID introduced a bill into Congress, The IDs for an Inclusive Democracy Act creating free federal IDs for Americans.

In 2023, Calvin became the author of "American Identity in Crisis," which was released on the 19th of September. Her book details how 26 million American adults have no government ID.

== Awards and nominations ==
- TIME's 16 People and Groups Fighting for a More Equal America
- 2018, Fast Company 100 Most Creative People in Business
- TheGrio 100
- Business Insider 30 under 30

== Selected publication ==
- Calvin, Kat. American Identity in Crisis: Notes from an Accidental Activist. Amistad, 2023.
