= Corvida Raven =

American writer, technological artist, entrepreneur

Corvida Raven is an American writer, technological artist, entrepreneur and public speaker who lives and works out of New York City, New York. She has been garnering national attention since the age of 19 for her blog, shegeeks.net, and other projects aimed at making technological skills and information accessible to the public at large, and particularly to youth, people of colour, women and marginalized communities.

== Background and education ==
Raised in Miami, Florida, Raven began blogging in eighth grade. She majored in computer science at Hampton University while working at Blockbuster before taking a sabbatical and moving to Atlanta, Georgia. Her trademark plain-language approach to blogging about tech is informed by her experiences teaching family members how to resolve computer problems. Speaking on the challenges of being a black woman in a largely male dominated field, Raven has said: “I do my best to let my passion [for working] with new technology speak for me. I also make a point of highlighting and recommending other women — black, white, Latina and Asian — within my network, because the change starts with me. Sometimes you have to expose others to the things you’re already exposed to. That’s what helps you become successful in an office, boardroom and on the Web.”

== Career ==
Raven's blog, shegeeks.net, is her main platform for educating others about navigating social media, the internet and technological devices. Since founding the site in 2008, Raven has worked as a social media advisor for Intel and for General Motors' ChevyVolt Unplugged Tour. Once a freelance contributor to Laptop Mag, she has also served as Blog Editor for Mr. Tweet and as a Community Manager at ReadWriteWeb, the Industry Standard, Fast Company, and TED. She is co-founder of everythingtwitter.com and the Social Geeks Roundtable podcast.

== Awards and recognition ==
shegeeks.net was awarded Best Technology Blog at the 2008 Black Weblog Awards, and named one of the Top 100 Social Media, Internet Marketing and SEO Blogs in 2013. Fast Company named Raven as one of The 50 Most Influential Women in Technology in 2009 and a Social Media Curator to Watch. She was listed as one of Glamour Magazine's 21 Amazing Young Women of 2011, and recognized by Essence Magazine as a Power Player and one of the Top 25 Black Women Entrepreneurs. Time Magazine's Techland Blog listed hers among 25 Facebook Profiles You Should Subscribe to Right Now, and she is a recipient of a 2012 Women Interactive Digital Vanguard Award.
