= Jerome Ringo =

American activist (1955–2025)

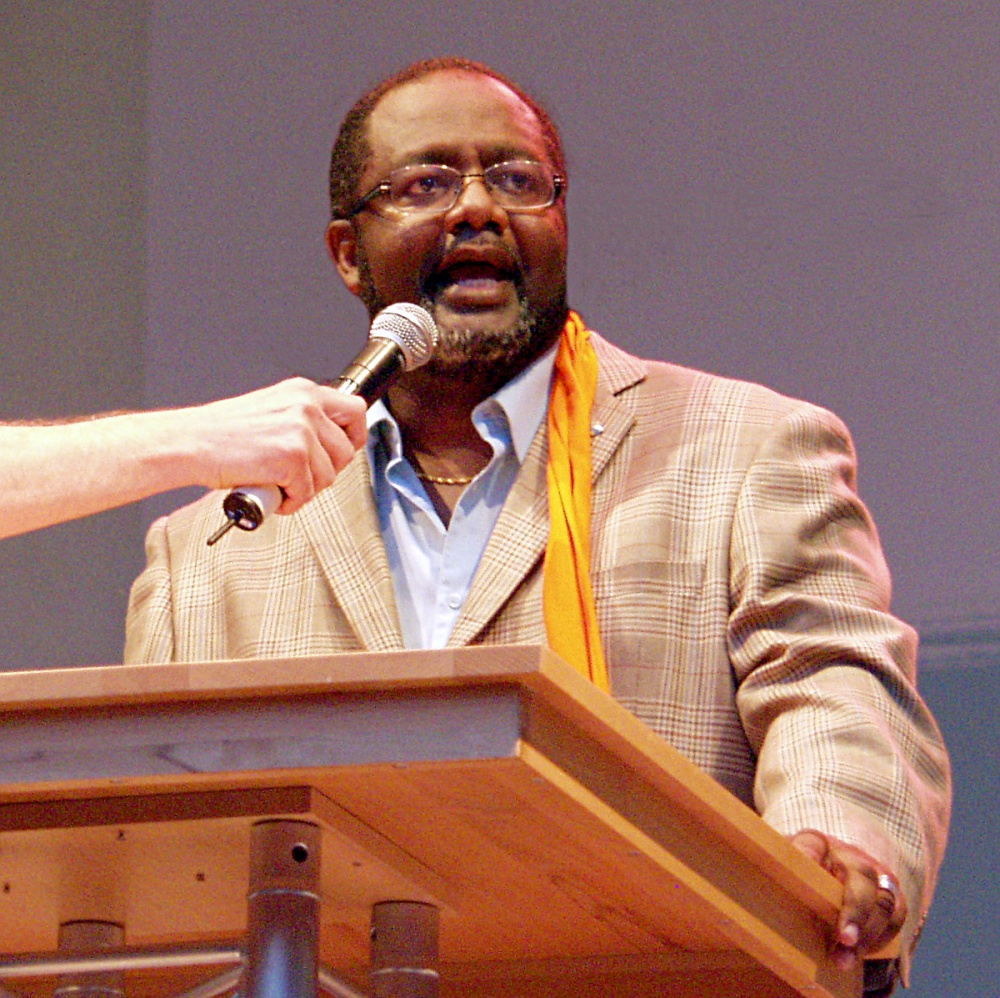
Jerome Ringo on the German Protestant Church Day, Cologne, 2007

Jerome Claude Ringo (March 2, 1955 – April 30, 2025) was an American environmental justice, clean energy, and quality jobs advocate who founded and chaired renewable energy developer Zoetic Global.

Ringo previously chaired the National Wildlife Federation (NWF), becoming the first African American to hold the position for any major conservation organization, and was an associate research scholar and McCluskey Fellow for Conservation at Yale University. He was also president of the Apollo Alliance, a coalition of organized labor, environmentalist, business, and civil rights leaders dedicated to freeing the United States of dependence on foreign oil.

== Background ==
Jerome Ringo was born in Lake Charles, Louisiana on March 2, 1955, the third of six children born to Earl Ringo, a retired postal worker, and Nellie Ringo, a nurse. Ringo grew up in Bayous of Southern Louisiana during the height of the American civil rights movement, during which time Earl worked to racially integrate public schools in Louisiana.

His father would often play recordings of speeches by the Reverend Martin Luther King Jr. When he was thirteen, he and his brothers prepared to become the first black students to enroll in previously segregated schools in Lake Charles, Louisiana. In the middle of the night, their father awakened the boys, telling them to crawl up to the front window. When the boys looked out, they witnessed a posse of Ku Klux Klansmen, who were burning a cross in their front yard.

He was the only African-American working as a ranger at the world's largest Scout camp, in Cimarron, New Mexico.

Ringo attended college, planning to major in education at both Louisiana Tech University and McNeese State University. Before earning a degree, however, he decided to take a job in the petrochemical industry in 1975, lured by a high salary.

Ringo died of a ruptured brain aneurysm in a hospital in New Orleans on April 30, 2025, at the age of 70.

== Career ==
After college, Ringo worked in the petrochemical industry for 22 years, over half of that time as a union leader. Many of his relatives lived just beyond the fence from these industries, so he saw the impacts of pollution from refineries first hand. He noted that employees at the refinery wore masks and protective clothing, but that the neighbors across the fence, who were predominantly poor and black, received no such protection, and suffered disproportionately high levels of cancers and respiratory diseases.

Eventually, Ringo decided to help educate the people in communities affected by petrochemical pollution, teaching them how to effectively stop the discharge of chemicals into neighborhoods around refineries, leading to the beginning of his environmental activism. Ringo began his environmental activism in 1991, by becoming member of the Calcasieu League for Environmental Action Now (CLEAN), an affiliate of the Louisiana Wildlife Federation. Among the 20,000 members of the statewide group, he was the first African American ever to join.

Rather than trying to shut refineries and chemical plants down, he advocated the lobbying of state legislators on environmental laws, and encouraged citizens to show up at public hearings, where, as a community, they could express their fears and concerns and speak truth to power.

Ringo was transferred to Malaysia, and during one of his return trips to the United States in 1994, he was offered early retirement. After accepting the offer, he committed his life to full-time work on behalf of people beyond the refinery fences lines.

In 1998, he was the sole African-American delegate at the Global Warming Treaty negotiations in Kyoto, Japan, where he delivered an address. He also spoke at the Central American conference on sustainable development in Belize City, Belize. He addressed many historically-Black colleges and other universities, including the University of Michigan School of Natural Resources and Environment and at the University of Oregon's Public Interest Environmental Law Conference.

=== Apollo Alliance ===
As president of the Apollo Alliance, Ringo was working to educate the public and lobby in Washington, D.C. about the need to invest in alternative clean-energy sources, energy-efficient technology and jobs by building diverse coalitions. The Apollo Alliance seeks to reinvest in the competitiveness of American industry, rebuild cities, create good jobs, and ensure good stewardship of the economy and natural environment. "We are an organization that looks like the face of America," Ringo said.

The name of the alliance was chosen to pay homage to John F. Kennedy's Apollo program, which successfully put a man on the moon in 1969. The Apollo Alliance has been endorsed by leaders of the AFL–CIO, the Sierra Club, Greenpeace USA, the National Wildlife Federation, the Union of Concerned Scientists, the NAACP and other activist groups.

=== National Wildlife Federation ===
In 1996, Ringo was elected to serve on the board of directors of the National Wildlife Federation, a seventy-year-old conservation organization comprising 4.5 million members and over 700 employees. Since becoming chairman of the board in 2005, Ringo sought to further the NWF's partnerships with other organizations, particularly those involved with combating ecological dangers in poor and minority neighborhoods. He spearheaded programs that reach into urban and minority communities, including schoolyard habitat programs such as Earth Tomorrow, which focuses on minority kids in elementary, middle, and high schools.

"The single greatest issue for me as an environmentalist is climate change," Ringo told Mother Jones in 2005.

Ringo envisioned a new movement in environmentalism, where everyone becomes involved in planning for the future together. He believed that real success, in energy security, public health, environmental protection and social justice, will come when environmentalists are united and empowered to meet as equals with corporate interests.

=== Zoetic Global ===
Ringo founded Zoetic Global to address issues such as energy security in the developing world.

Zoetic secured a power purchase agreement with Ghana in January 2016. He promoted hydrokinetic technology to ministers and leaders of countries throughout Africa, Asia and Latin America.
