= Jamail Larkins =

American aviator and entrepreneur

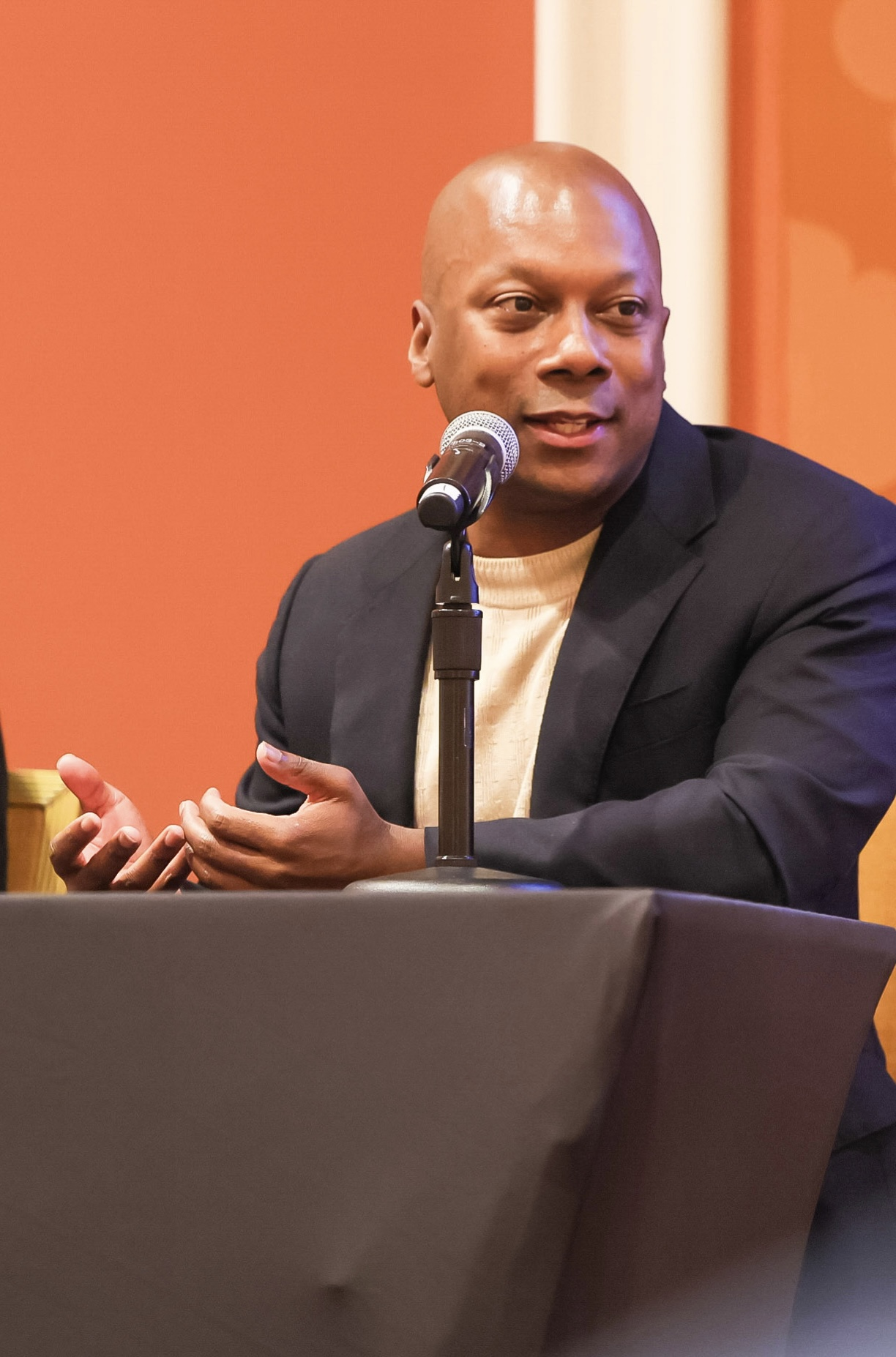
- Larkins in 2025
- Born: January 30, 1984 (age 42); Augusta, Georgia, U.S.
- Education: Embry–Riddle Aeronautical University
- Occupations: Aerobatic aviator, entrepreneur, public speaker
- Known for: Youngest American to solo an aircraft, at age 14; FAA Ambassador for Aviation and Space Education
- Website: jamaillarkinsaviation.com

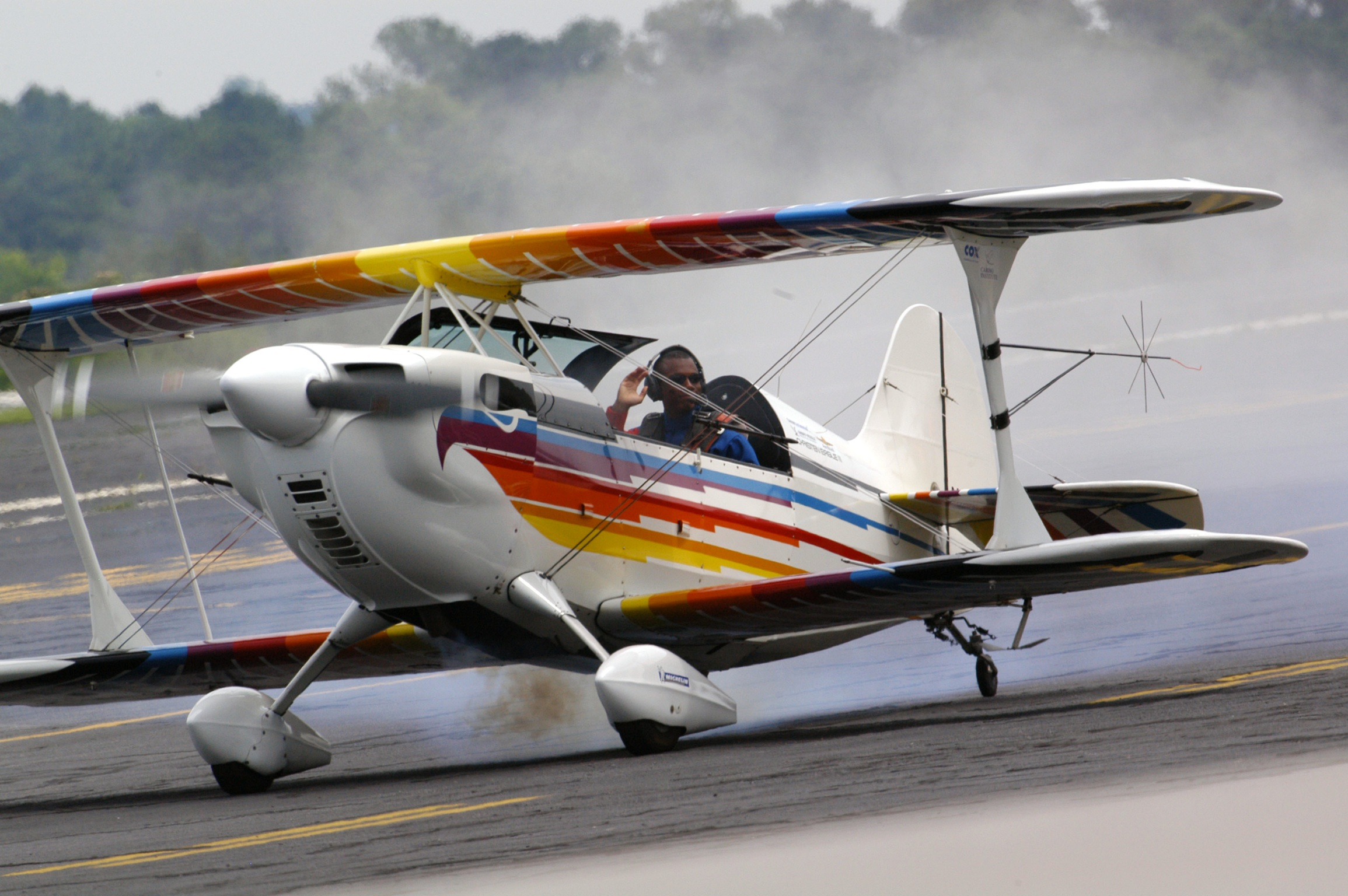
Larkins taxiing in a Christen Eagle II after an airshow demonstration, 2004

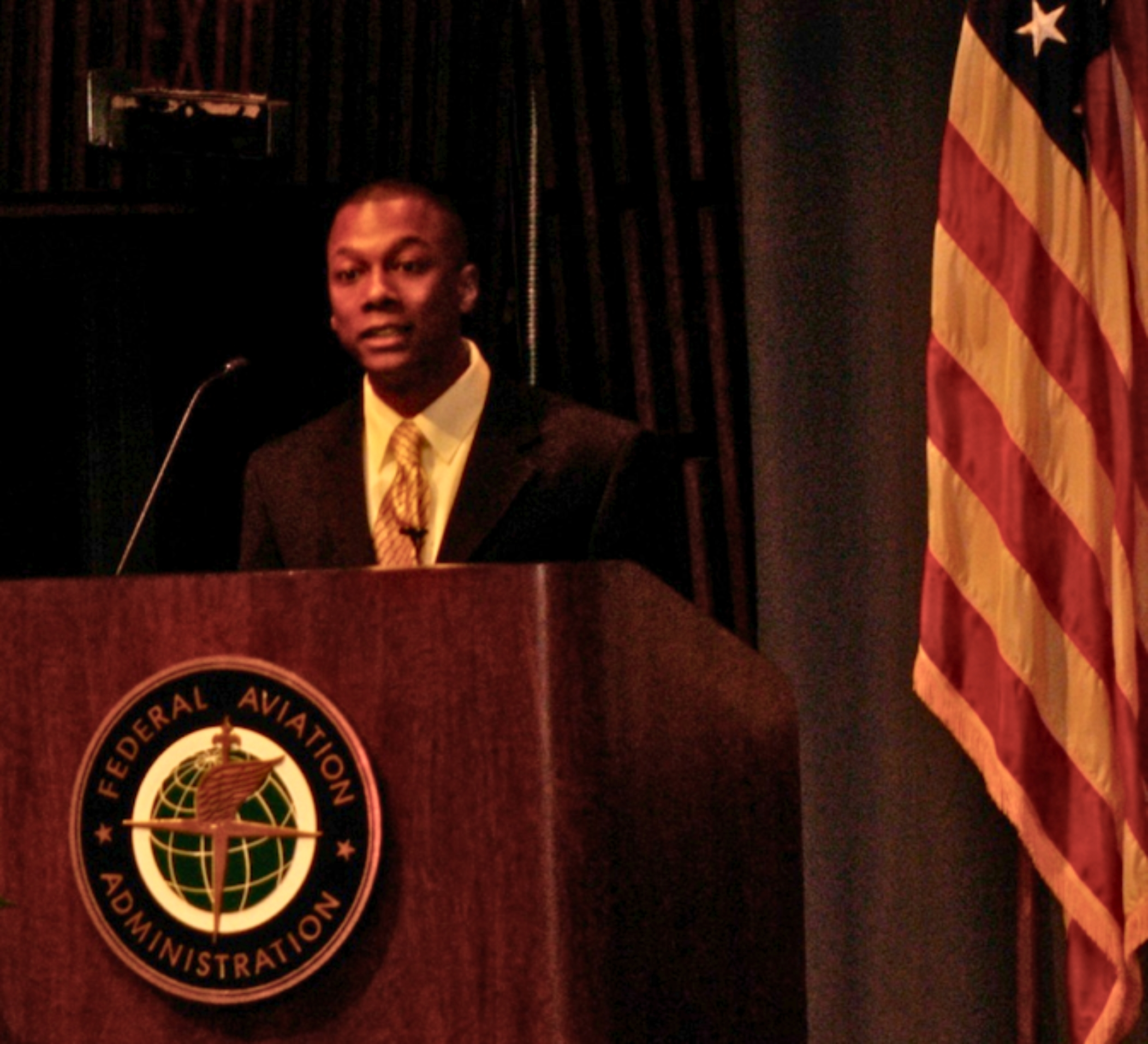
Larkins speaking at an FAA event, 2005

Jamail Larkins (born January 30, 1984) is an American aviator and entrepreneur. As a 14 year old, he was the youngest American to fly a powered aircraft solo, and at 18 became one of the youngest aerobatic airshow performers in the United States. In 2005, he was appointed the first Ambassador for Aviation and Space Education for the Federal Aviation Administration (FAA). In 2014, he testified before the United States House Committee on Small Business on issues related to business aviation.

== Early life and education ==
Larkins was born in Augusta, Georgia. As a child, he became interested in aviation through flight simulators and the Experimental Aircraft Association's (EAA) Young Eagles program, through which he took his first flight at age 12.

In 1998, after being unable to obtain a waiver to solo an aircraft in the United States because of age restrictions, Larkins traveled to Canada, where aviation regulations allowed him to solo a powered aircraft at age 14, the youngest American pilot to do so.

In 2000, at age 16, Larkins became the first student pilot to solo the Cirrus SR20.

Larkins later attended and graduated from Embry–Riddle Aeronautical University, where he studied aviation business administration.

== Airshows & FAA appointment ==
In the early 2000s, Larkins became active in airshow aerobatics, and by 2005 was among the youngest aerobatic airshow performers in the United States, leading to an appearance on the Late Show with David Letterman, and a profile from NPR on its "News & Notes" series High-Flying Careers for being one of the youngest pilots in the country.

In February 2005, FAA Administrator Marion Blakey appointed Larkins as the FAA's first Ambassador for Aviation and Space Education, before embarking on a national speaking tour of hundreds of schools to promote career opportunities in aviation to young people. By 2012, he had spoken to over 200,000 students on these tours.

Larkins also served as a National Spokesman for the EAA Young Eagles Program's "Vision of Eagles Program", a youth education initiative of the EAA Aviation Foundation.

In 2012, Larkins and the FAA signed a memorandum of understanding to renew the Aviation and Space Education ambassadorship.

== Business activities ==
=== Ascension Aircraft ===
In 2006, Larkins founded Ascension Aircraft, an aviation company that provides brokerage, financing, and charter services for private and business aviation clients.

Inc. magazine included Ascension Aircraft and Larkins in its 2009 "30 Under 30" feature on young entrepreneurs. He was also placed on Black Enterprise magazine's "40 Next" list in 2011, which celebrates the next generation of black entrepreneurs and business leaders, and in 2014, was listed on Forbes magazine's "30 Under 30" for the Energy and Industry category.

As president and CEO of Ascension Aircraft, Larkins was featured on the official Obamawhitehouse.gov website advocating for the passage of the American Jobs Act in 2011.

=== AviationStart ===
In 2025, Larkins launched AviationStart, a digital platform that provides free resources, scholarship information and training opportunities for aspiring young aviators.

== 2014 congressional testimony ==
In February 2014, Larkins testified before the United States House Committee on Small Business during a hearing on general aviation and the U.S. economy. According to the congressional record, his testimony addressed the role of general aviation in supporting small businesses.
