= Terrie Williams =

American philanthropist

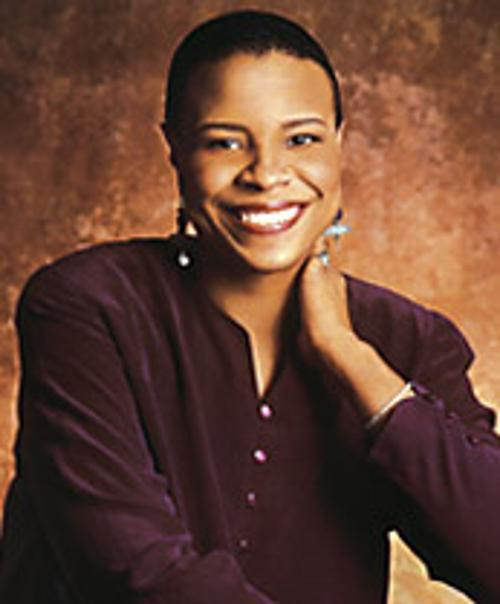
- Born: May 12, 1954 (age 72); Mount Vernon, New York, U.S.
- Education: Brandeis University (BA); Columbia University School of Social Work (MS)
- Occupations: Relations speaker; author; therapist; philanthropist

Terrie Williams (born May 12, 1954) is an American public relations speaker, author, therapist, and philanthropist.

== Early life ==
Williams was born to parents Charles and Marie.

== Education ==
Williams, after completing her high school, continued her education at Brandeis University in Waltham, Massachusetts where she received a BA in Psychology and Sociology. She received an Alumni Achievement Award in 1988. Upon completion of her bachelor's degree, she went on to obtain a Master's of Science in Social Work at Columbia University.

== Early career ==
Williams worked as a medical social worker at New York Hospital (now called Weill-Cornell Medical Center) counseling terminally ill and disabled patients. Later, she met and befriended jazz musician Miles Davis, who encouraged her to open her own business.

=== The Terrie Williams Agency ===
In 1988, she founded the Terrie Williams Agency (TTWA) a public relations firm. When it began, it represented Miles Davis and Eddie Murphy, TTWA expanded to offer employee training and motivational speaking for various organizations. The agency's clientele includes figures such as Prince, Chris Rock, Janet Jackson, Louis Gossett Jr., Al Sharpton, Sean "Diddy" Combs, Mo'Nique, Ntozake Shange, and Johnnie L. Cochran. Corporate clients have included HBO, Revlon, Time Warner, Essence magazine, and Forest City Ratner Companies.

Her work in public relations has been referenced in textbooks, business guides, print editorials, social media, and pop culture. From its creation in 1988 to its closure in 2018, the public relations firm provided many services on a pro bono basis to under-served communities.

== Battle with depression ==
In 2003, Williams suffered from severe depression that impacted her public relations career. She publicly discussed this in a 2005 Essence magazine interview, emphasizing the stigma around mental health treatment in the African-American community. Transitioning into a mental health advocate, Williams spoke nationally to encourage open conversations on mental health issues. She wrote a book, Black Pain, in 2009 that is focused on mental health challenges in the black community.

== Books ==
Williams has written four books; The Personal Touch: What You Really Need to Succeed in Today's Fast-paced Business World, Stay Strong: Simple Life Lessons for Teens, A Plentiful Harvest: Creating Balance and Harmony Through the Seven Living Virtues and Black Pain: It Just Looks Like We're Not Hurting.

== Philanthropy and activism ==
In 2005, Williams founded the Stay Strong Foundation (SSF)—now dissolved. SSF aimed to raise awareness of teen issues, promote the personal well-being of young people and enhance educational and professional development. The foundation encouraged corporate and individual responsibility, developed educational resources for youth and youth organizations, provided and coordinated internships, set up mentoring opportunities, and facilitated visits by prominent individuals and business professionals to schools, libraries, youth organizations, and group homes.

In March 2008, the Stay Strong Foundation launched the "Healing Starts With Us" campaign. In 2010 SSF collaborated with the Ad Council and the Substance Abuse and Mental Health Services Administration (SAMHSA) to introduce a campaign entitled "Share Ourselves: Healing Starts With Us." To date, the campaign has garnered $2.5 million in donated national advertising space and 11 million media impressions to significantly heighten awareness of the importance of mental and emotional health.

In October 2012, Williams was a featured speaker on mental health for World Mental Health Day.

== Awards and honors ==
- In 1991 Williams received the New York Women of Communications Matrix Award in the category of Public Relations
- In 1996, Williams was the first person of color to be awarded the Vernon C. Schranz Distinguished Lectureship at Ball State University
- 2006 Institute for the Advancement of Multicultural & Minority Medicine's Eagle Fly Free Award
- In 2009 NAMI/FAMILYA of Rockland County recognized Williams' extraordinary commitment to de-stigmatizing mental illness by giving her their Florence Gould Gross Award
- 2009 Dr. David Satcher Mental Health Trailblazer Award—Jackson State University (Southern Institute for Mental Health Advocacy, Research and Training)
- 2009 The Citizens Committee for New York City Marietta Tree Award for Public Service
- Ebony's 2010 "Power 150" for Activism
- In 2009, Williams was listed among Woman's Day magazine's 50 "Women Who Are Changing The World"
- The National Alliance on Mental Illness of New York City (NAMI-NYC Metro) 2010 award Honoring Pioneering Women in Mental Health
- 2011 Williams was named "PR Executive of the Year" at the MAAX Summit
- 2011 Full Circle Health Award
- 2011 recipient of New Federal Theater's 40th Anniversary Woodie King, Jr. Award
- 2011 Emmett Till Legacy Foundation's "Woman of Courage" Award
- 2011 The Khary Orr Leadership Award—African American Heritage Parade Committee
- 2012 SCLC Women Drum Major for Justice Award
- 2012 National Association of Social Workers-NYC Social Work Image Award
- Terrie Williams was the 2013 Commencement Keynote Speaker for Metropolitan College of New York
