= Actor Award for Outstanding Performance by a Male Actor in a Leading Role =

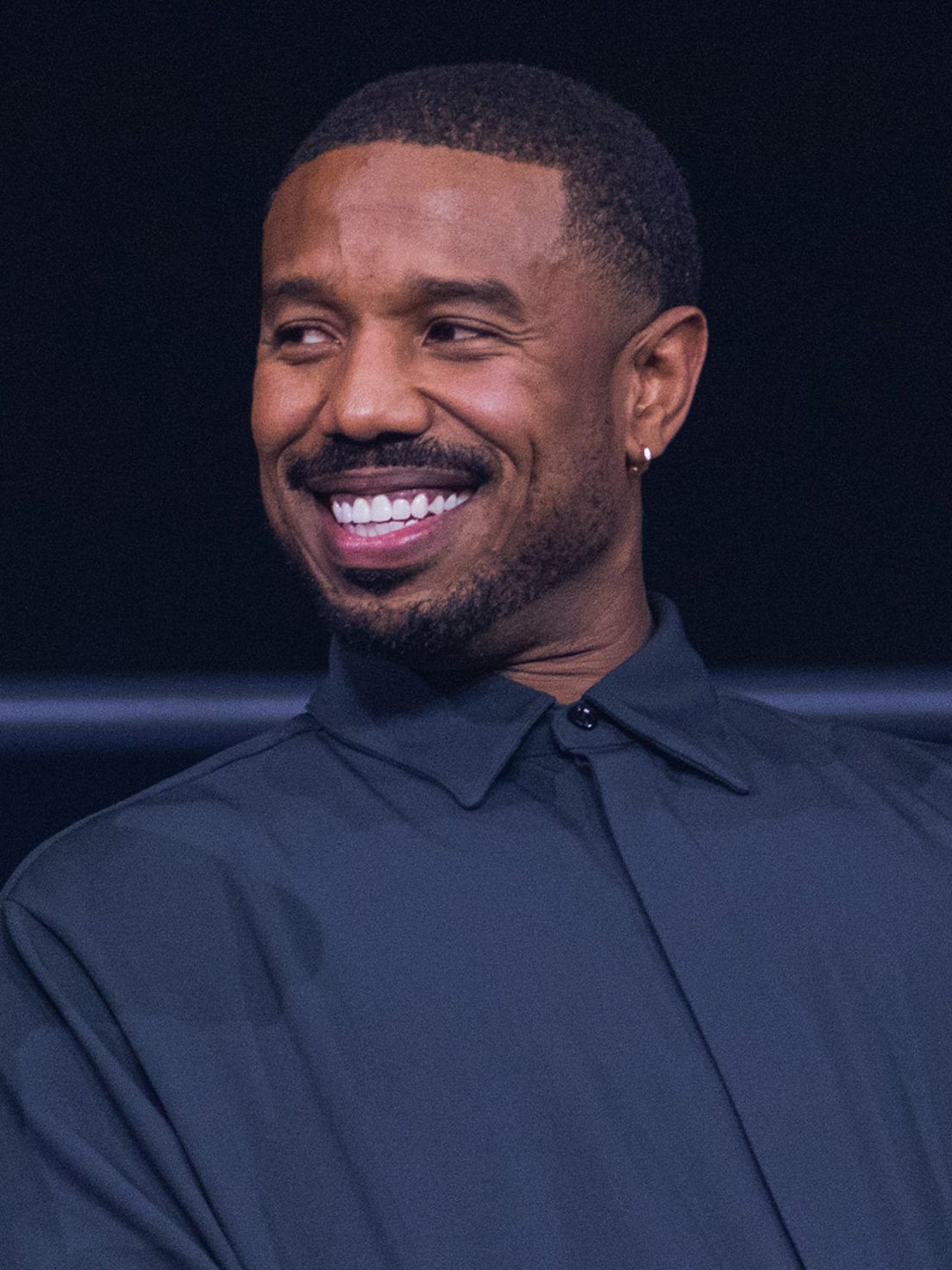
- The 2025 recipient: Michael B. Jordan
- Awarded for: Outstanding Performance by a Male Actor in a Leading Role in a Motion Picture
- Location: Los Angeles, California
- Presented by: SAG-AFTRA
- First award: Tom Hanks for Forrest Gump (1994)
- Currently held by: Michael B. Jordan for Sinners (2025)
- Website: actorawards.org

The Actor Award for Outstanding Performance by a Male Actor in a Leading Role in a Motion Picture (formerly Screen Actors Guild Award for Outstanding Performance by a Male Actor in a Leading Role) is an award presented annually by the Screen Actors Guild. It has been presented since the 1st Screen Actors Guild Awards in 1995 to a male actor who has delivered an outstanding performance in a leading role in a film released that year.

This award has been presented 30 times, and 28 actors have won the award. Tom Hanks was the award's first winner for Forrest Gump (1994). The most recent winner is Michael B. Jordan, who won for his dual role as the Smokestack Twins in Sinners (2025). Daniel Day-Lewis has won the award three times; no other actor has won it more than once. Leonardo DiCaprio and Denzel Washington have the most nominations with six each. Timothée Chalamet and Washington are the youngest and oldest winners of this category, respectively.

== Winners and nominees ==
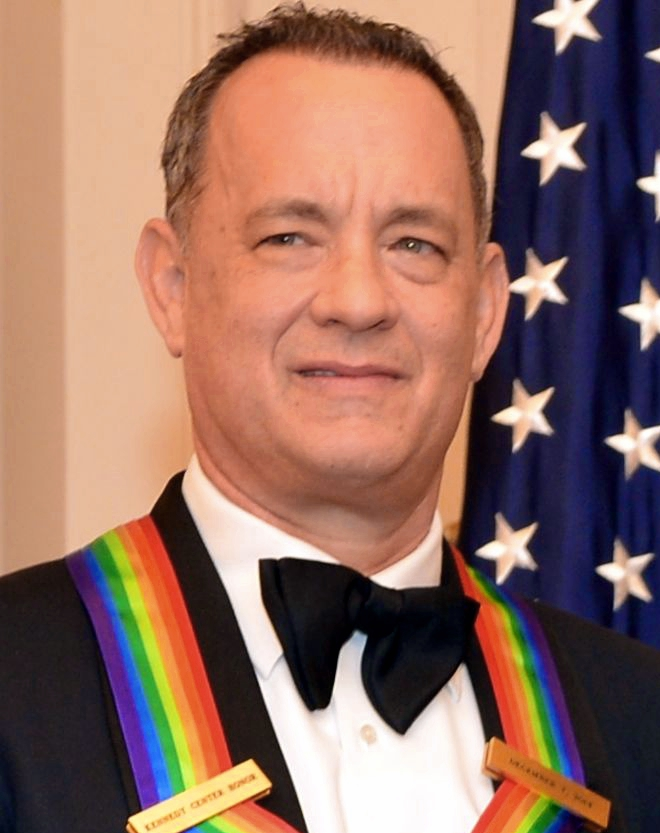
Tom Hanks was the award's first winner, for Forrest Gump (1994).

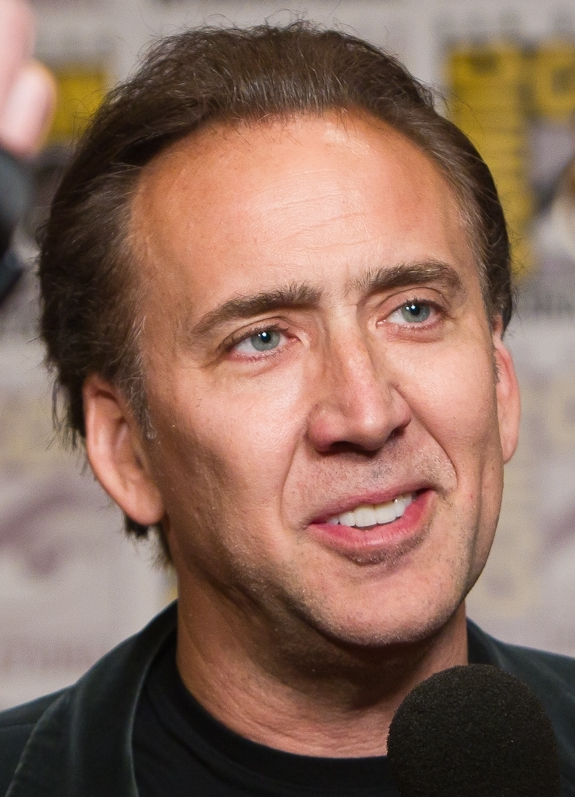
Nicolas Cage won for Leaving Las Vegas (1995).

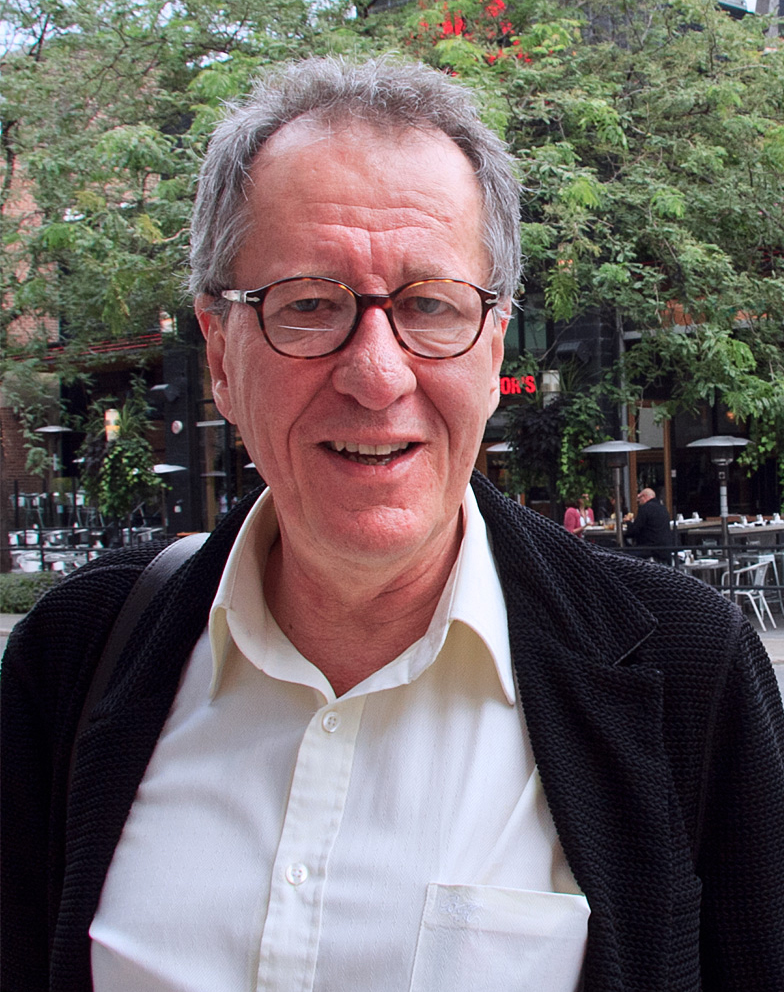
Geoffrey Rush won for Shine (1996).

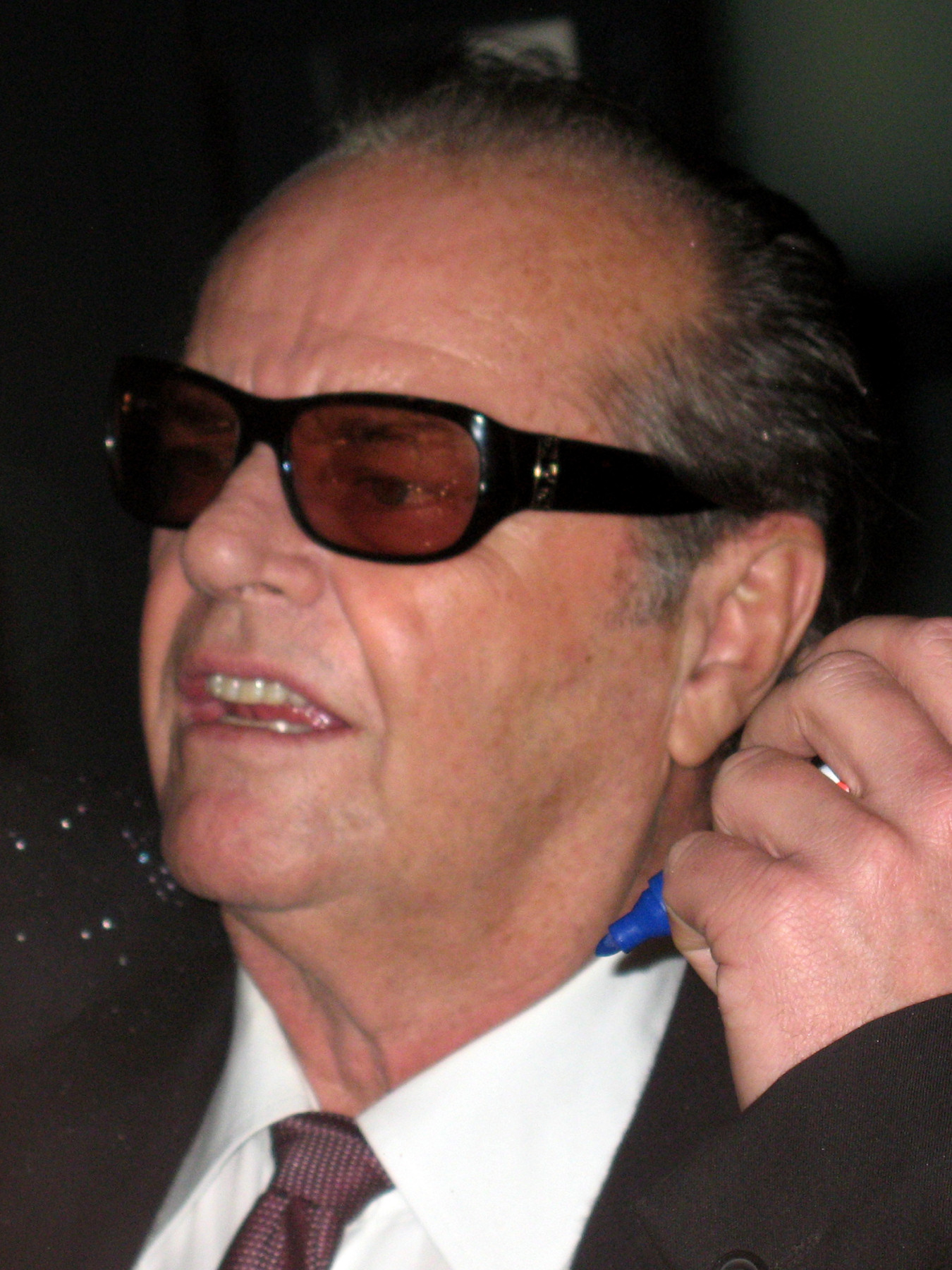
Jack Nicholson won for As Good as It Gets (1997).

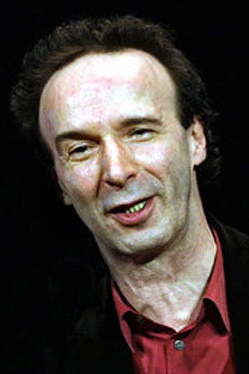
Roberto Benigni won for Life Is Beautiful (1998).

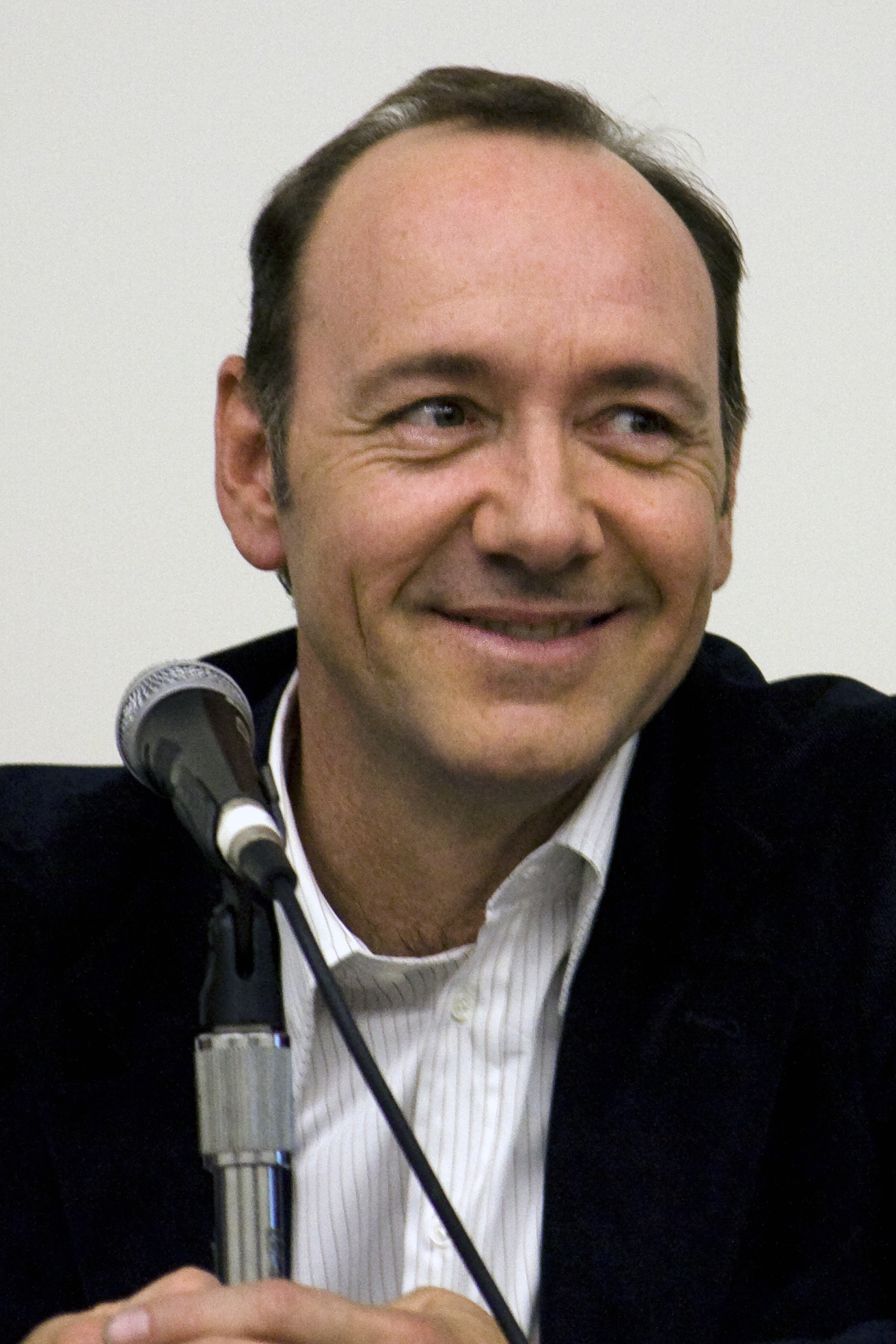
Kevin Spacey won for American Beauty (1999).

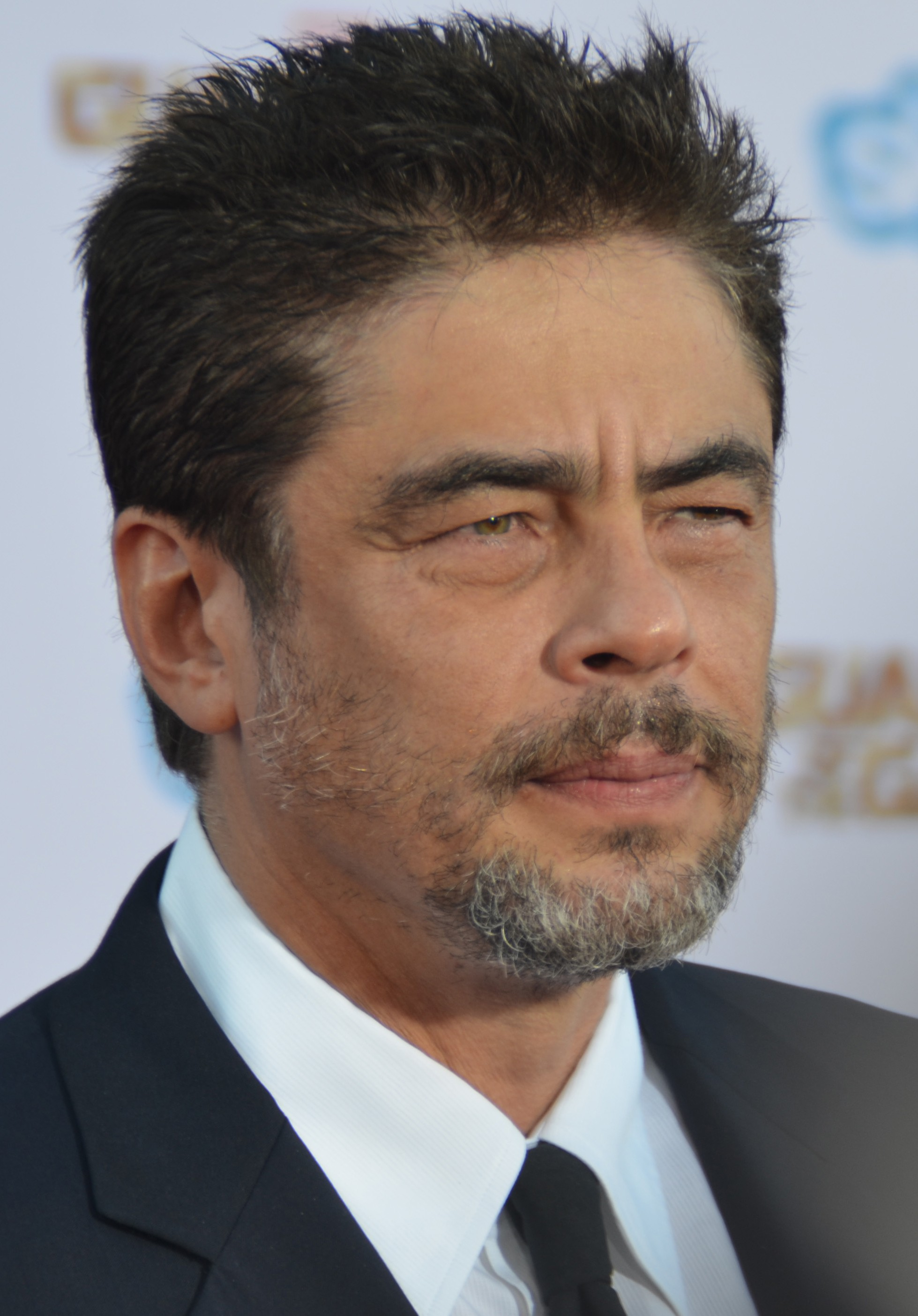
Benicio del Toro won for Traffic (2000).

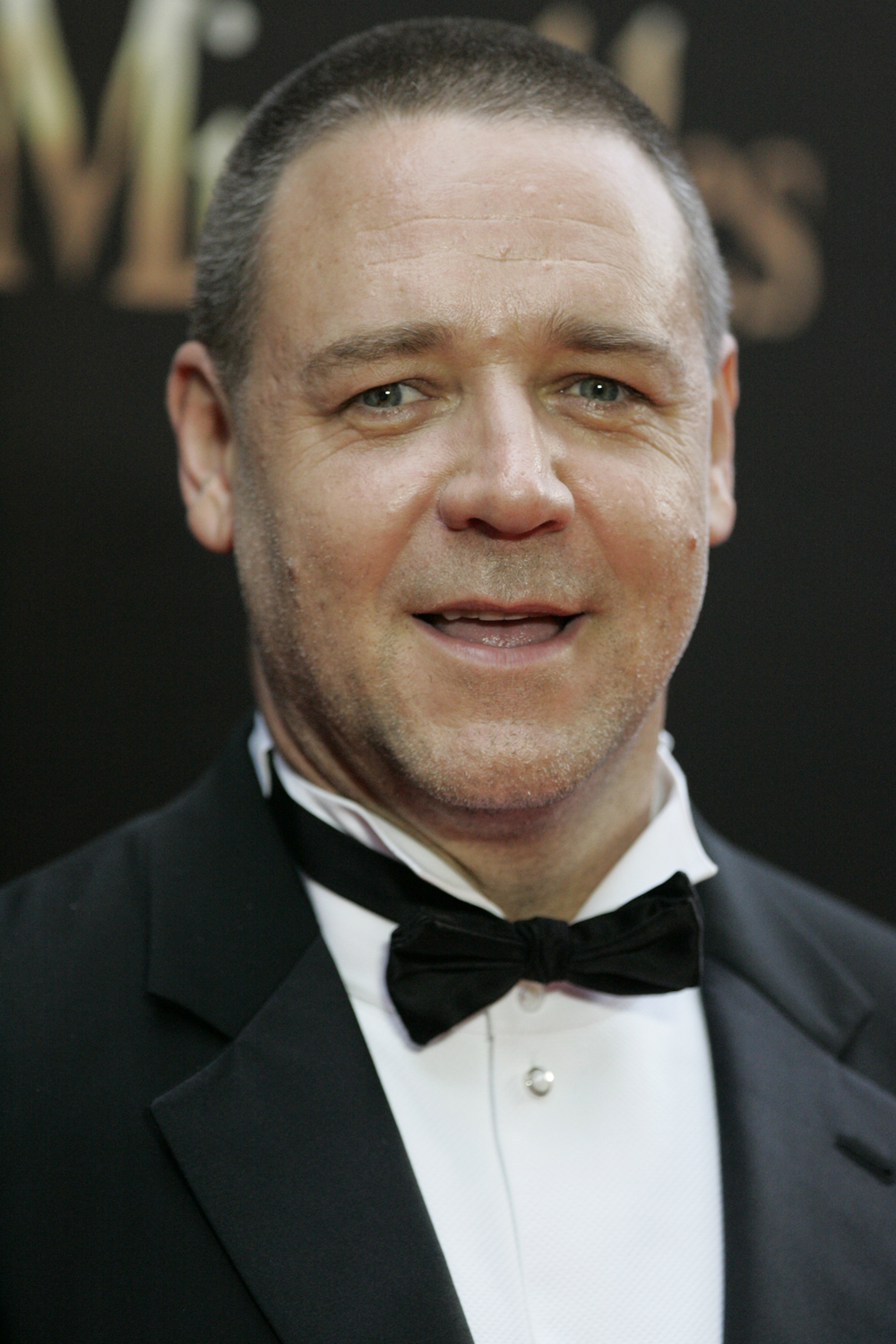
Russell Crowe won for A Beautiful Mind (2001).

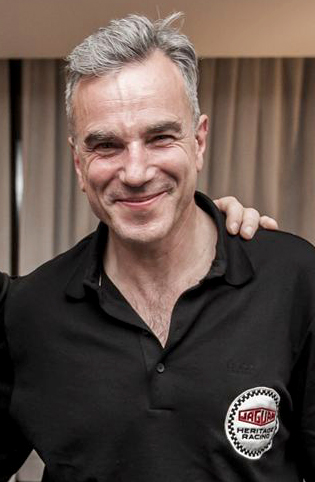
Daniel Day-Lewis won thrice for Gangs of New York (2002), There Will Be Blood (2007) and Lincoln (2012).

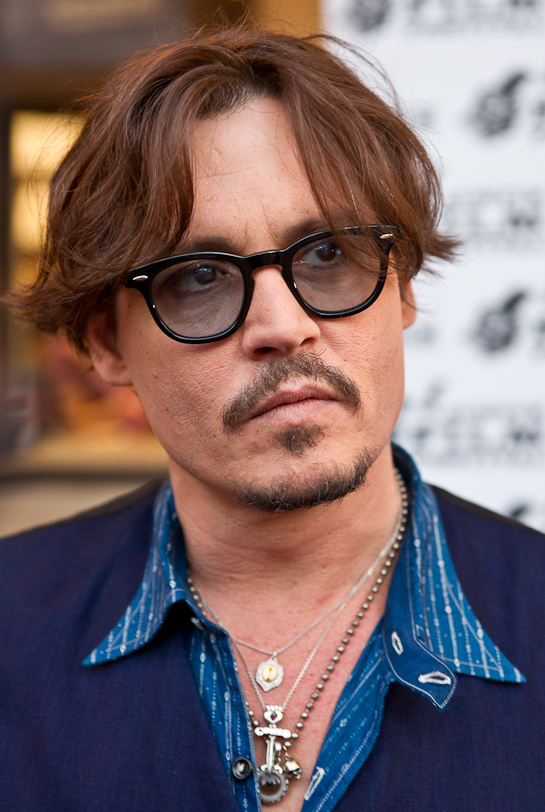
Johnny Depp won for Pirates of the Caribbean: The Curse of the Black Pearl (2003).

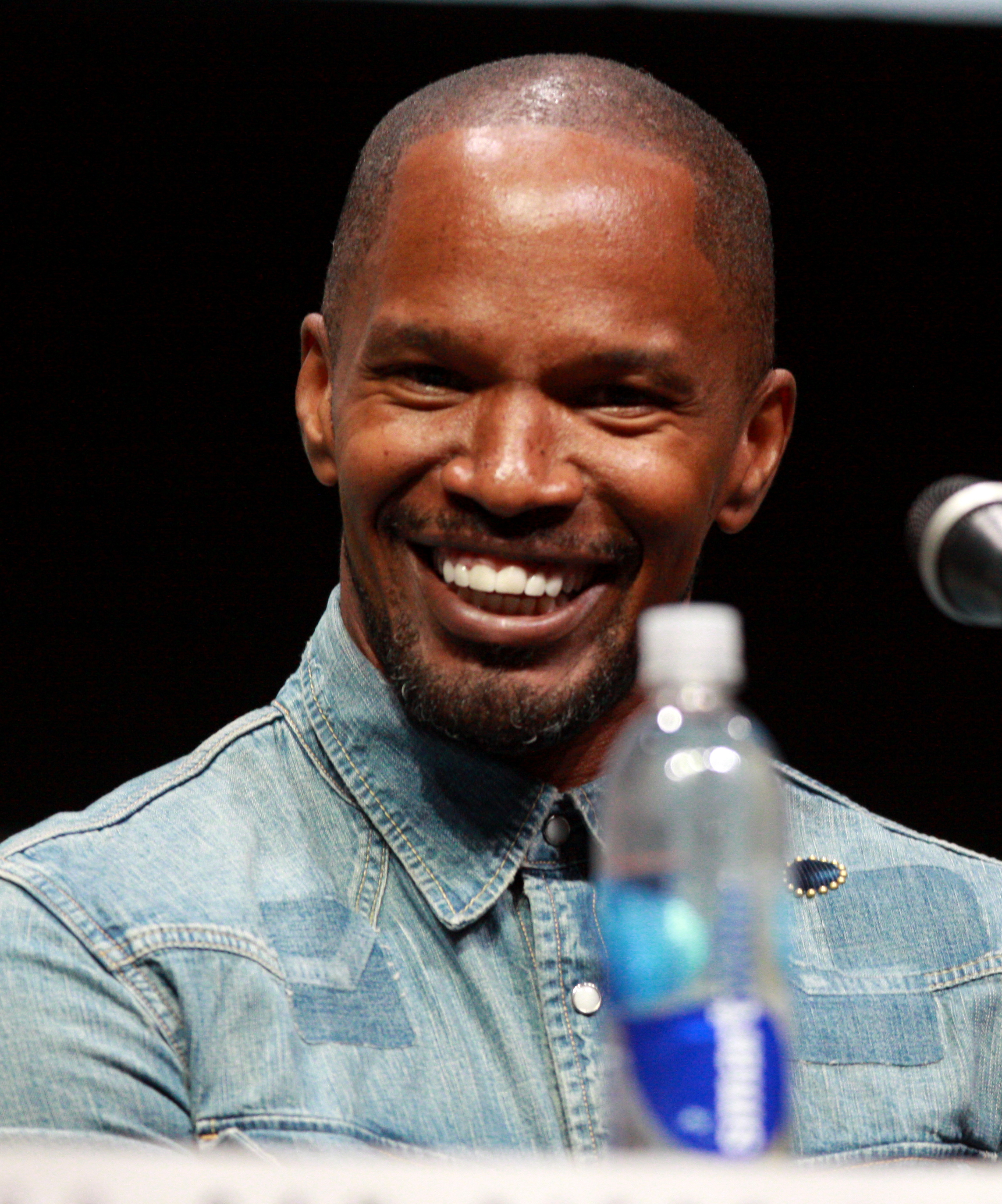
Jamie Foxx won for Ray (2004).

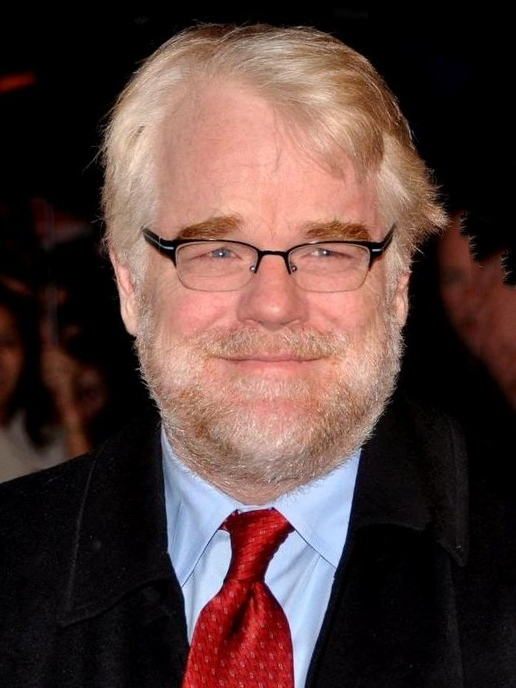
Philip Seymour Hoffman won for Capote (2005).

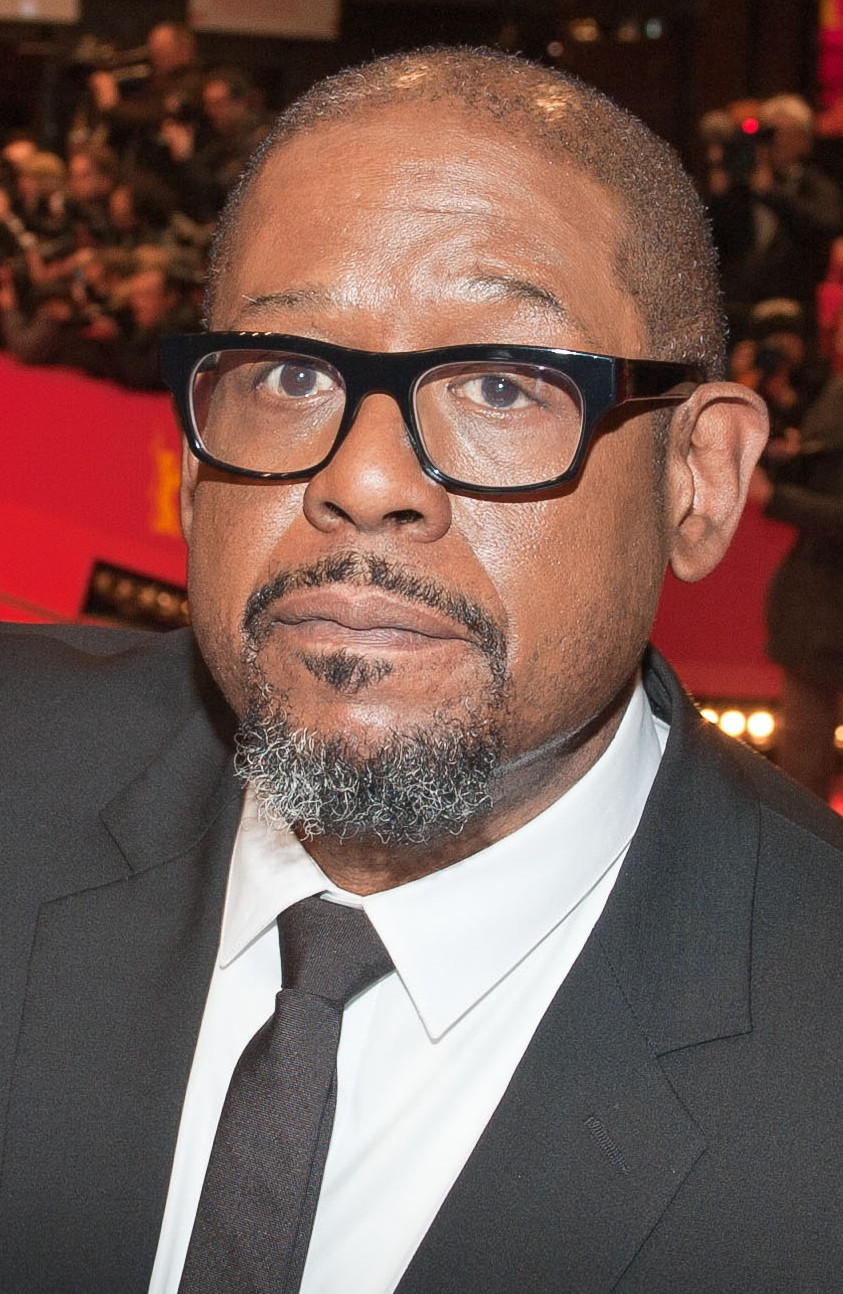
Forest Whitaker won for The Last King of Scotland (2006).

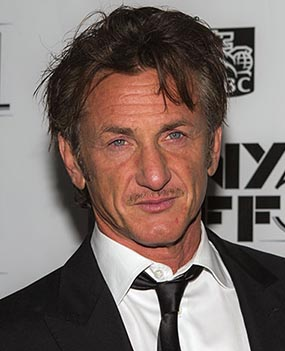
Sean Penn won for Milk (2008).

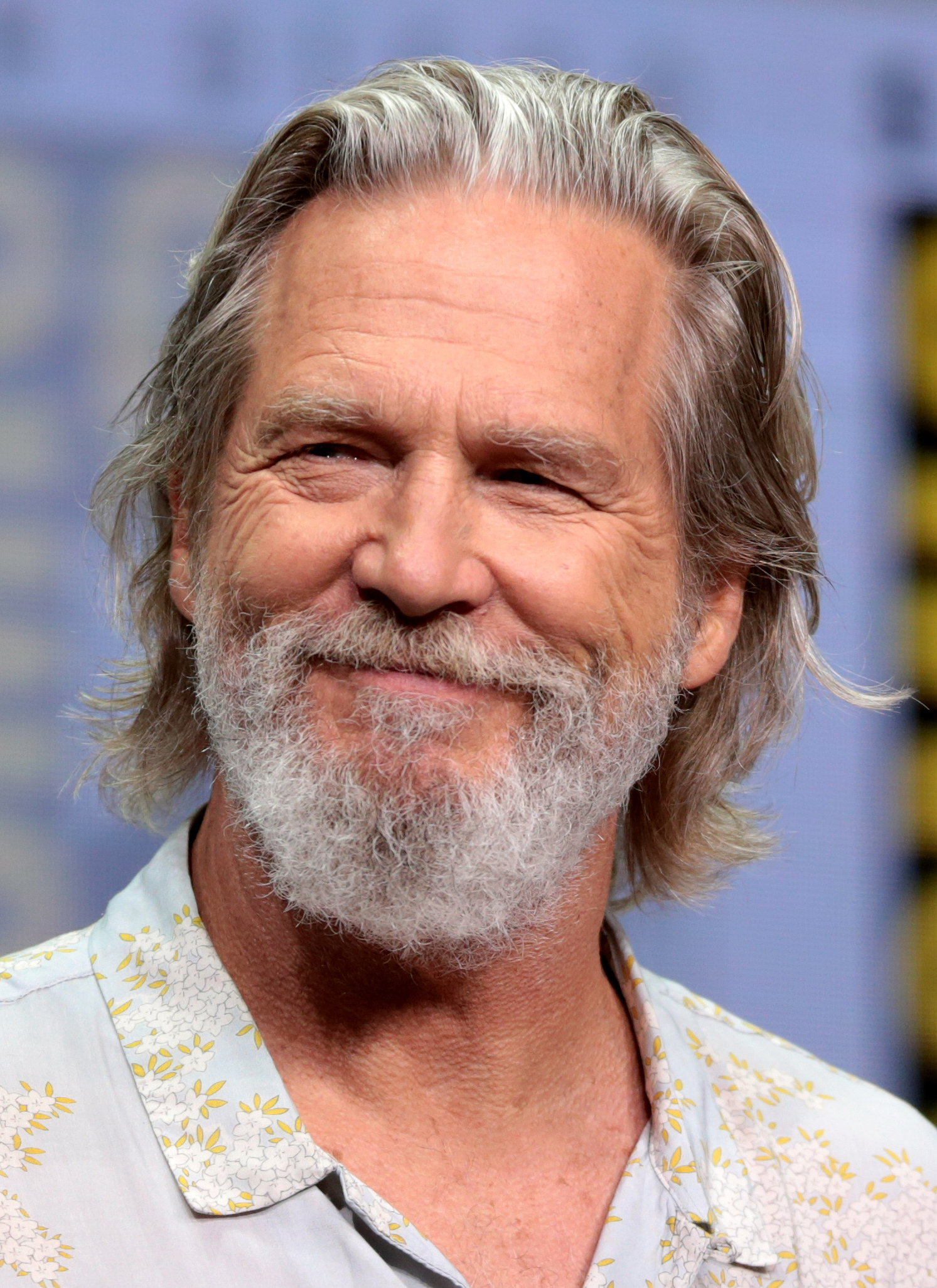
Jeff Bridges won for Crazy Heart (2009).

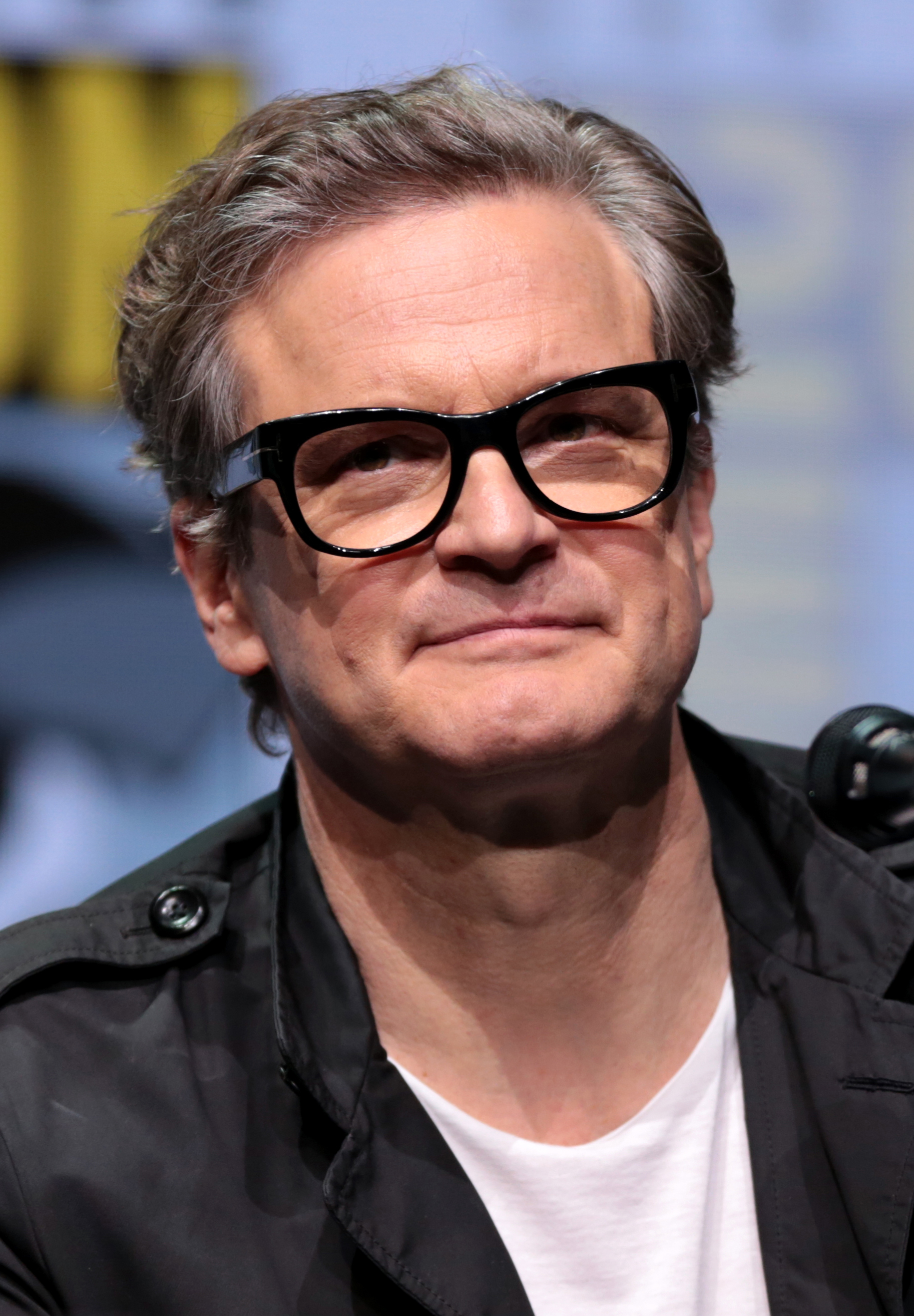
Colin Firth won for The King's Speech (2010).

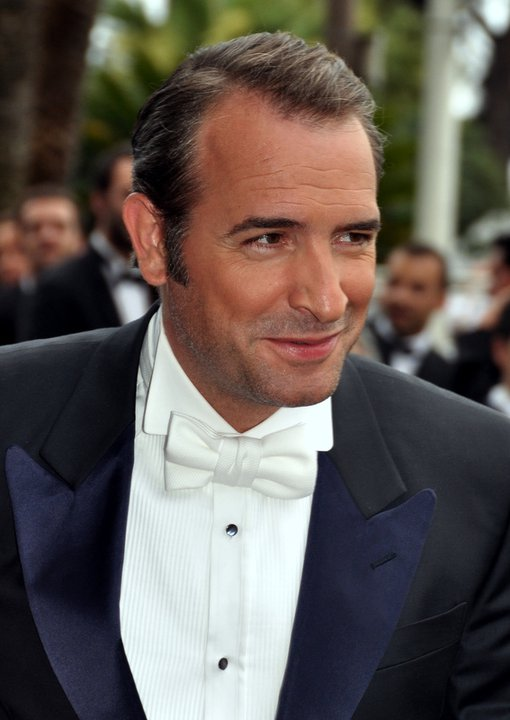
Jean Dujardin won for The Artist (2011).

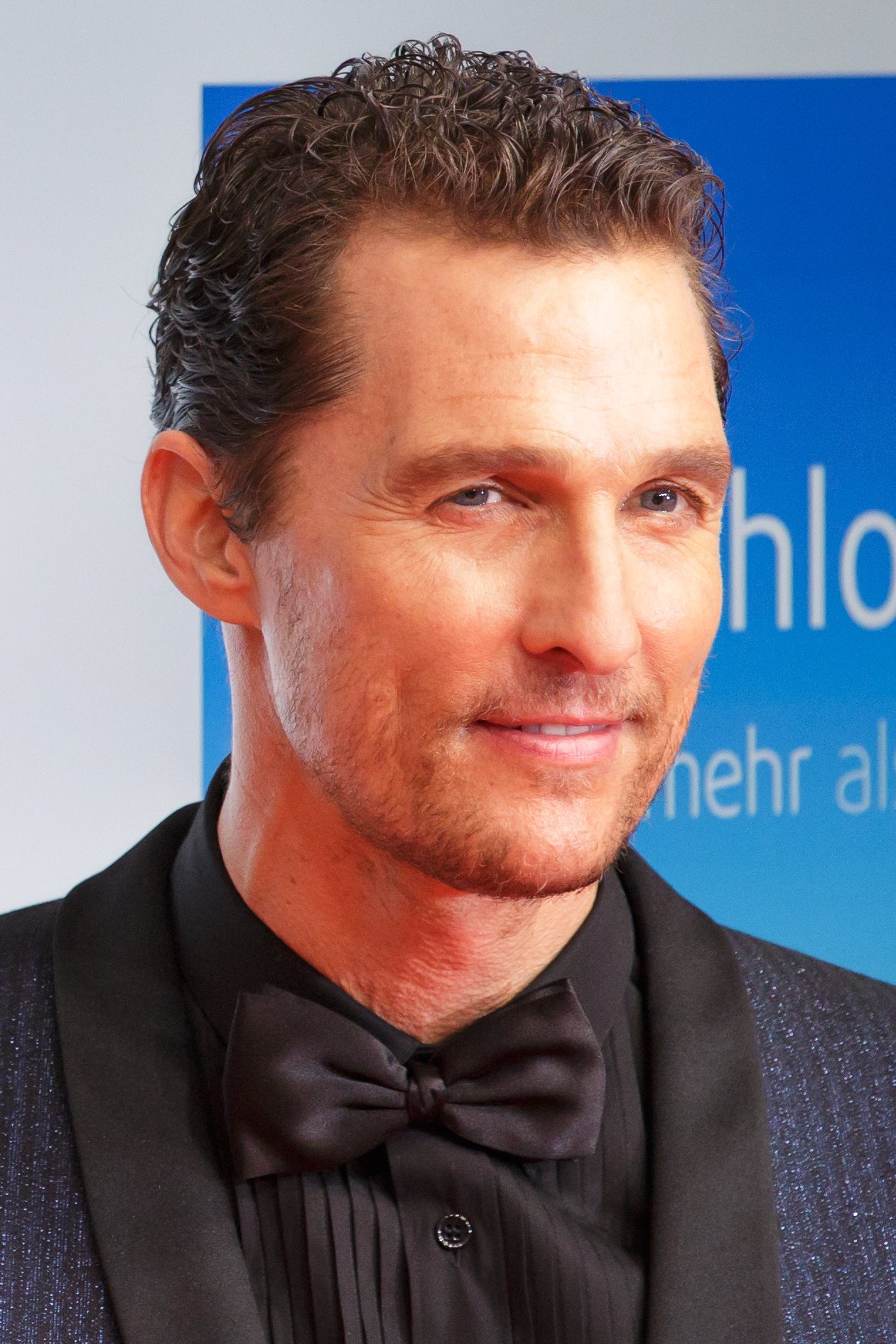
Matthew McConaughey won for Dallas Buyers Club (2013).

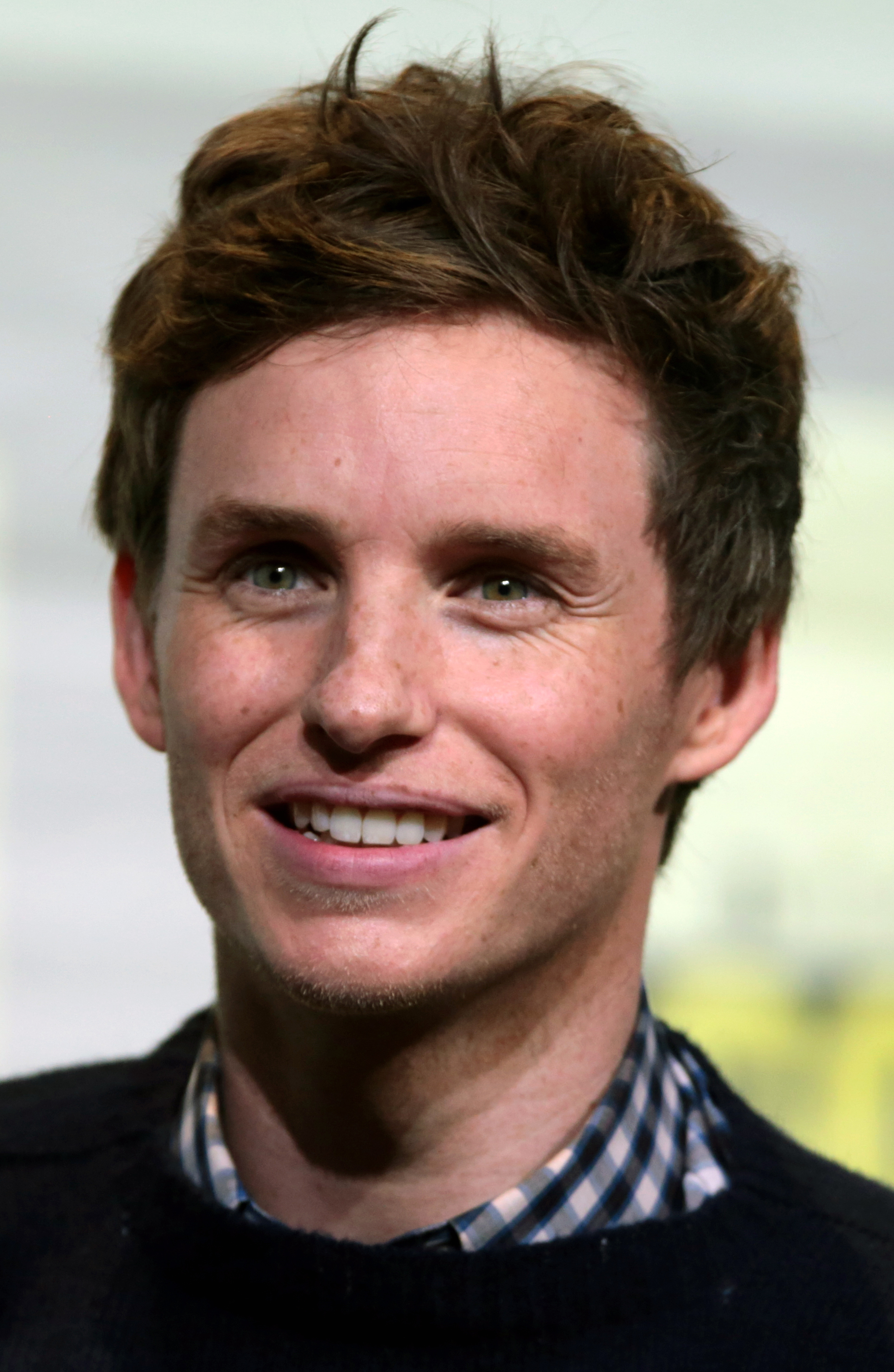
Eddie Redmayne won for The Theory of Everything (2014).

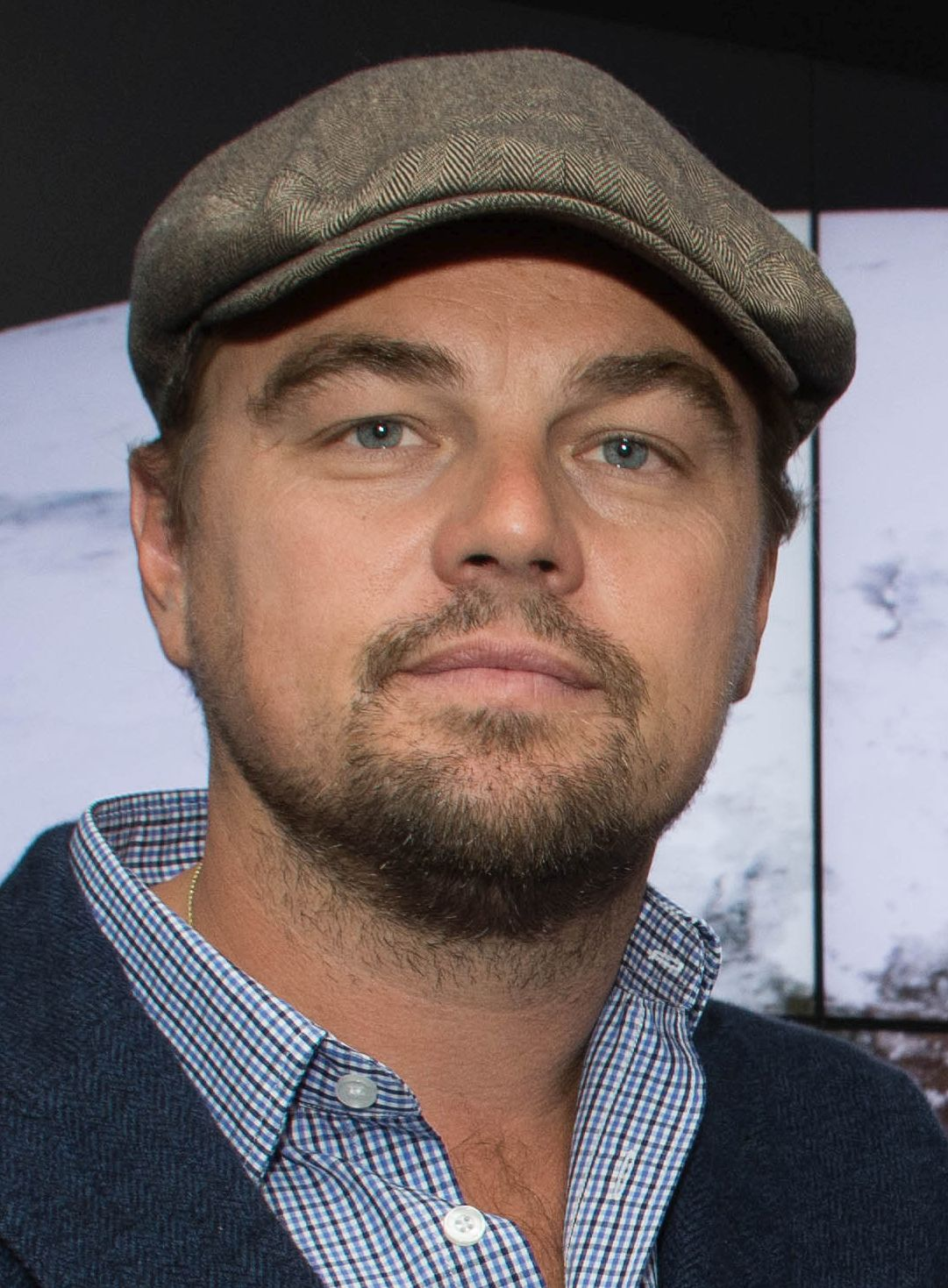
Leonardo DiCaprio won for The Revenant (2015).

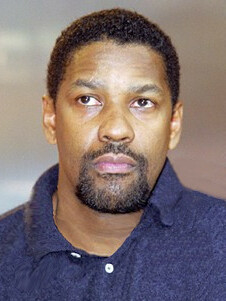
Denzel Washington won for Fences (2016).

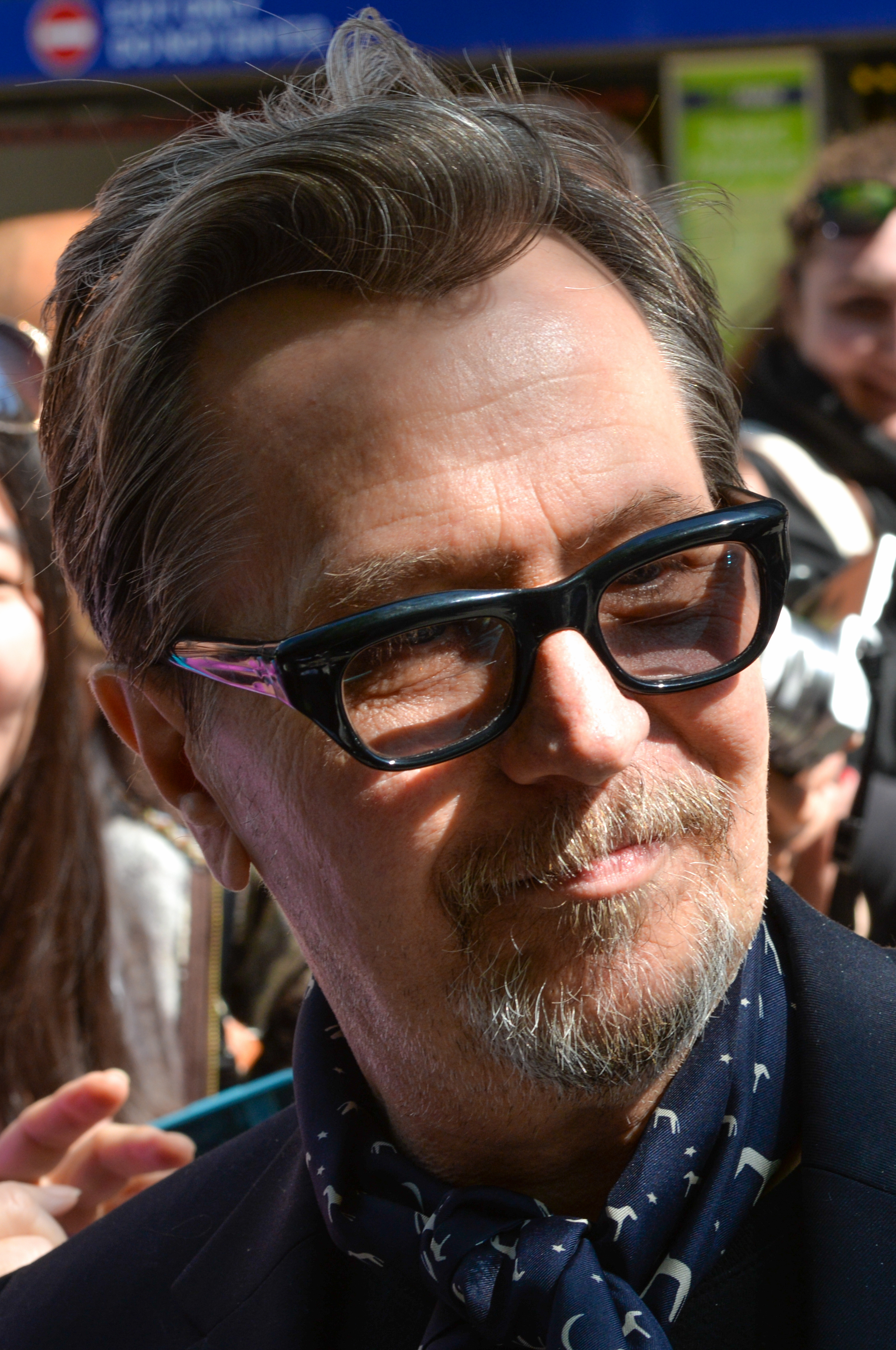
Gary Oldman won for Darkest Hour (2017).

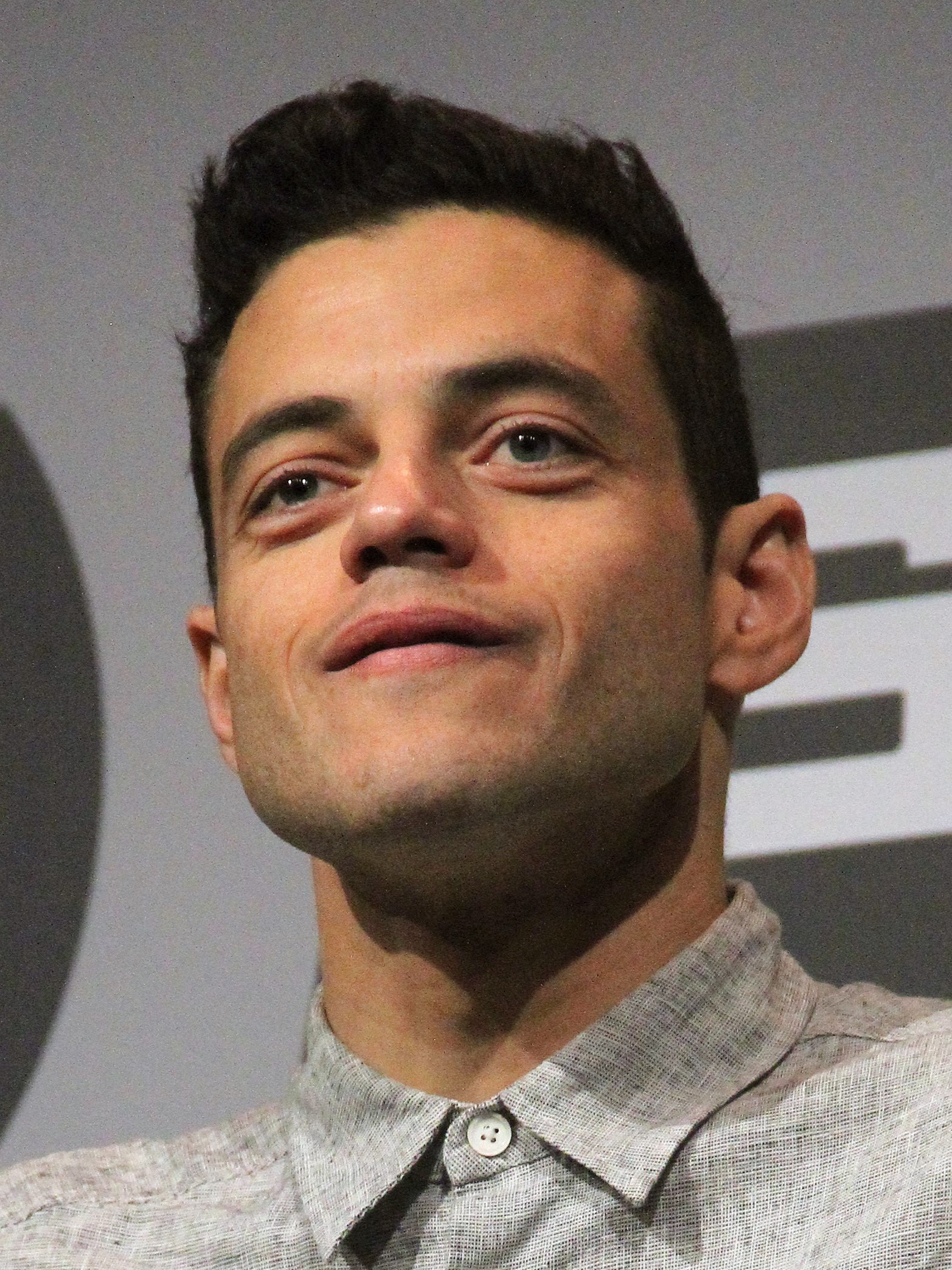
Rami Malek won for Bohemian Rhapsody (2018).

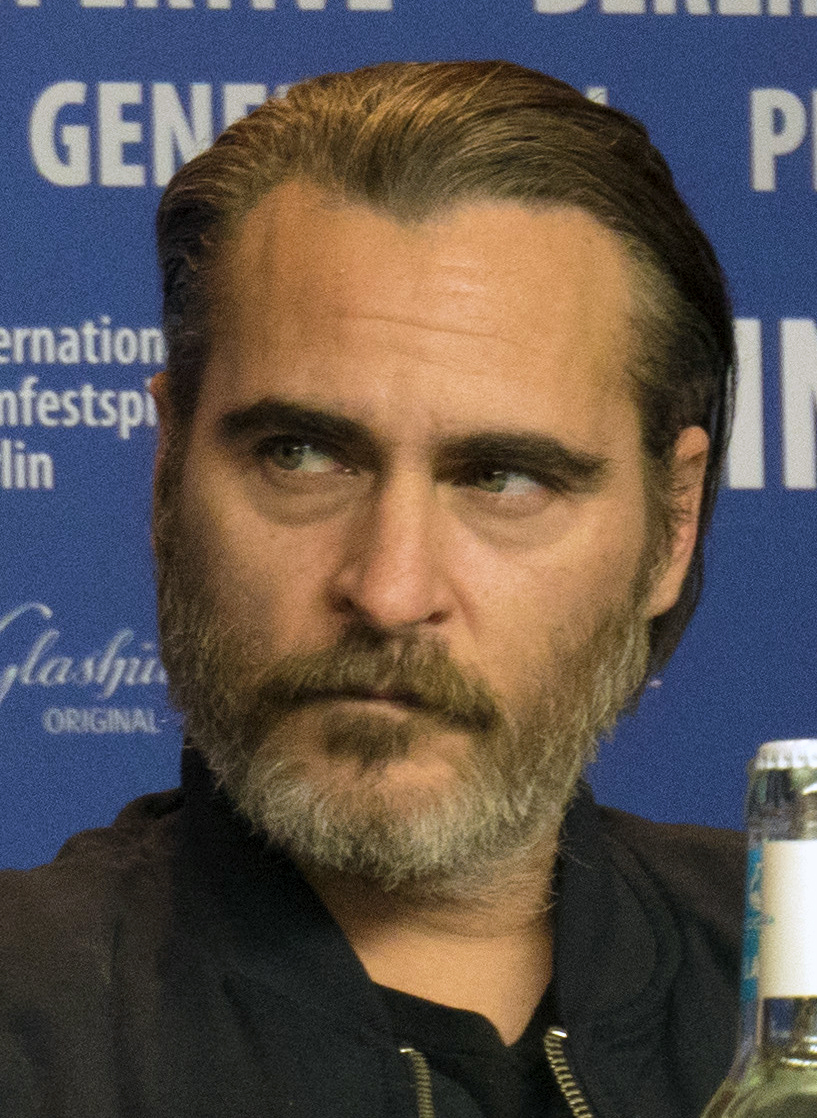
Joaquin Phoenix won for Joker (2019)

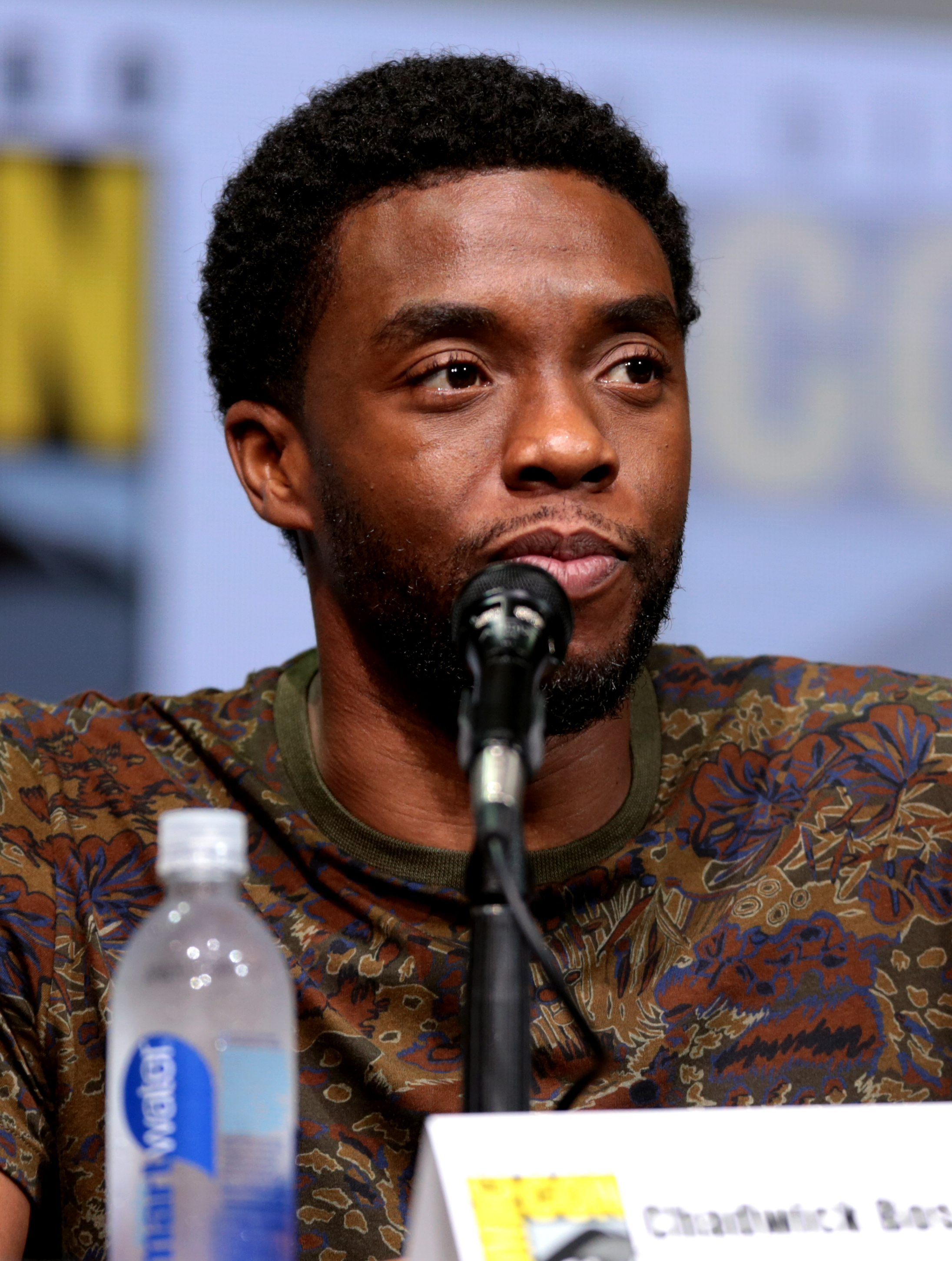
Chadwick Boseman won posthumously for Ma Rainey's Black Bottom (2020).

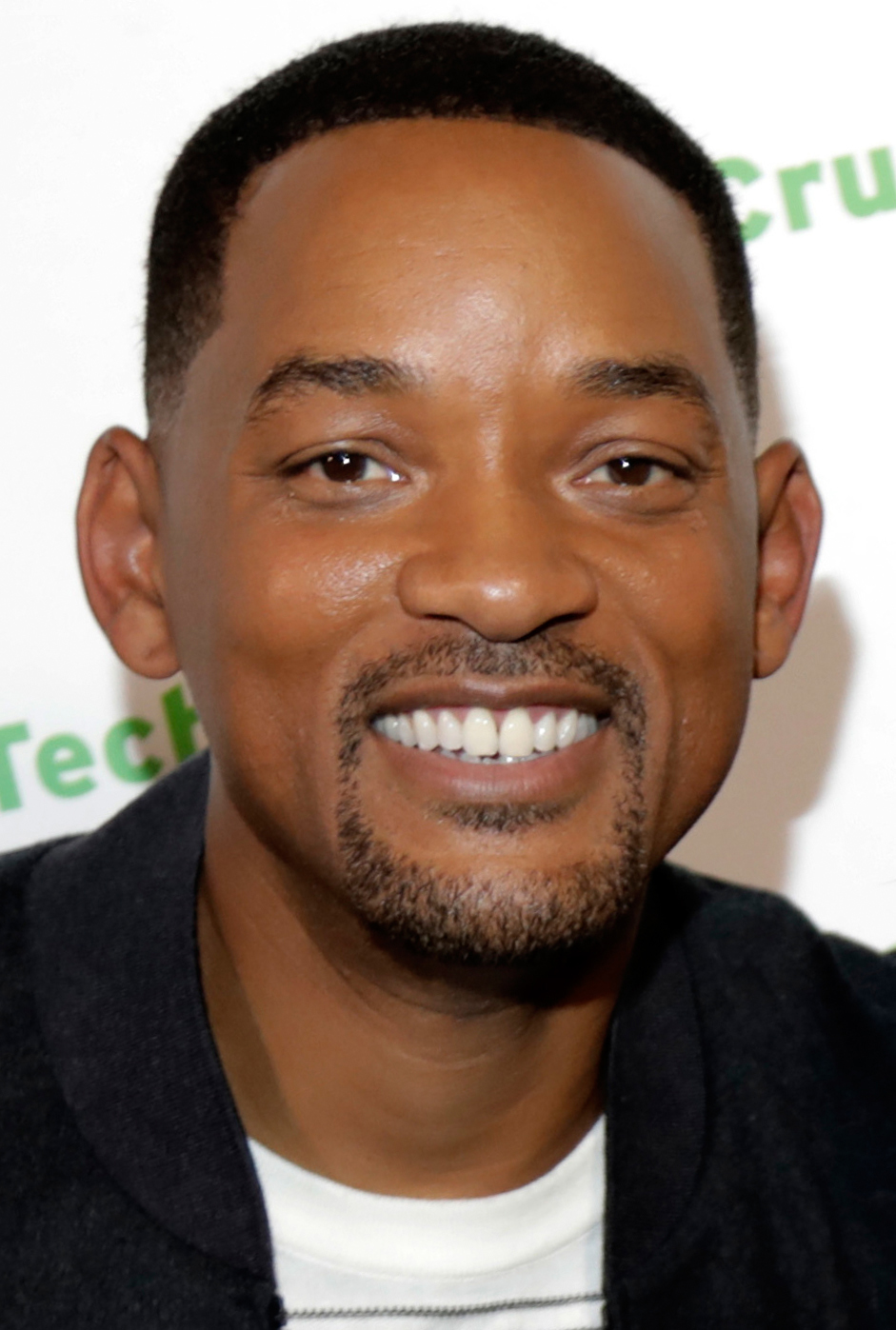
Will Smith won for King Richard (2021).

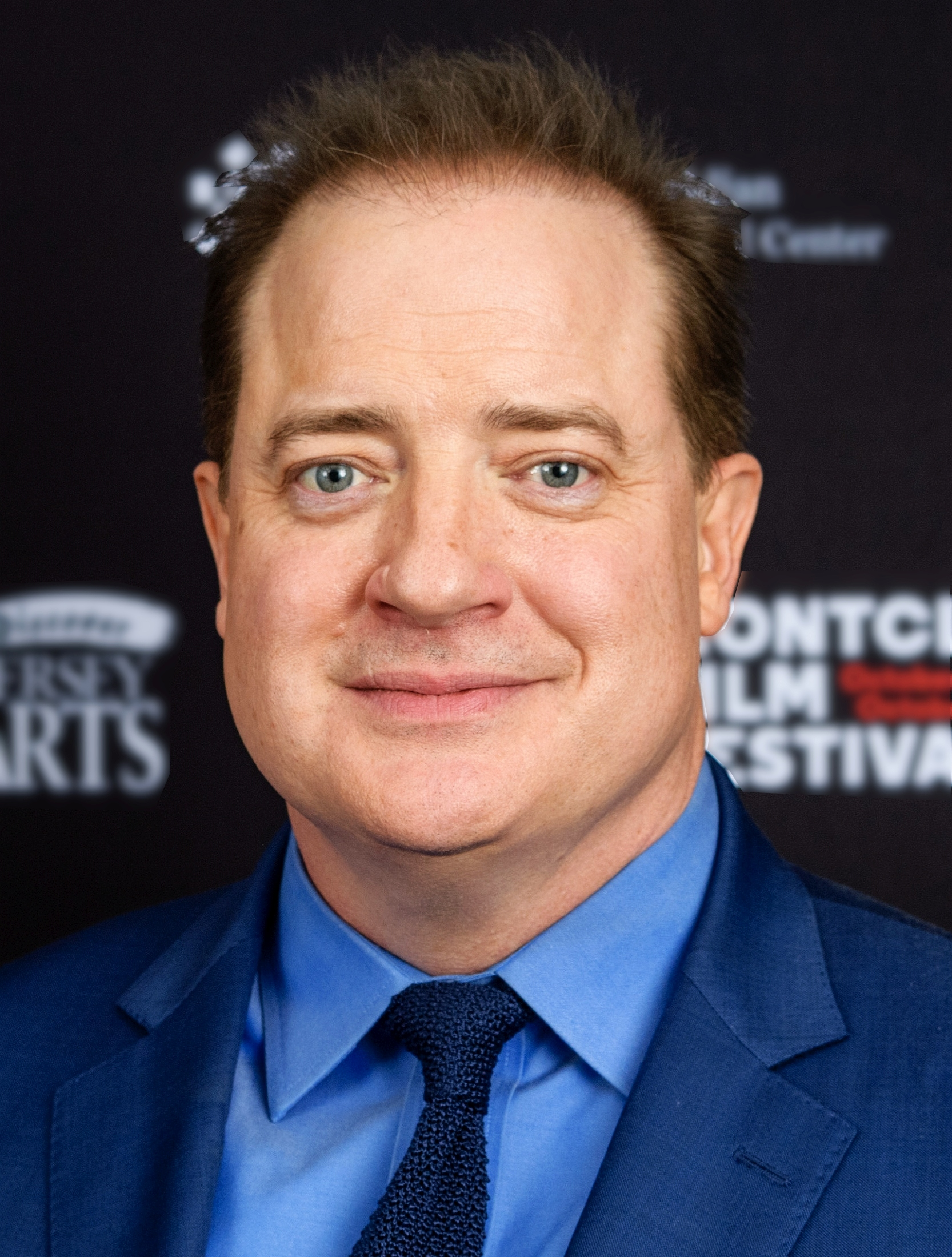
Brendan Fraser won for The Whale (2022).

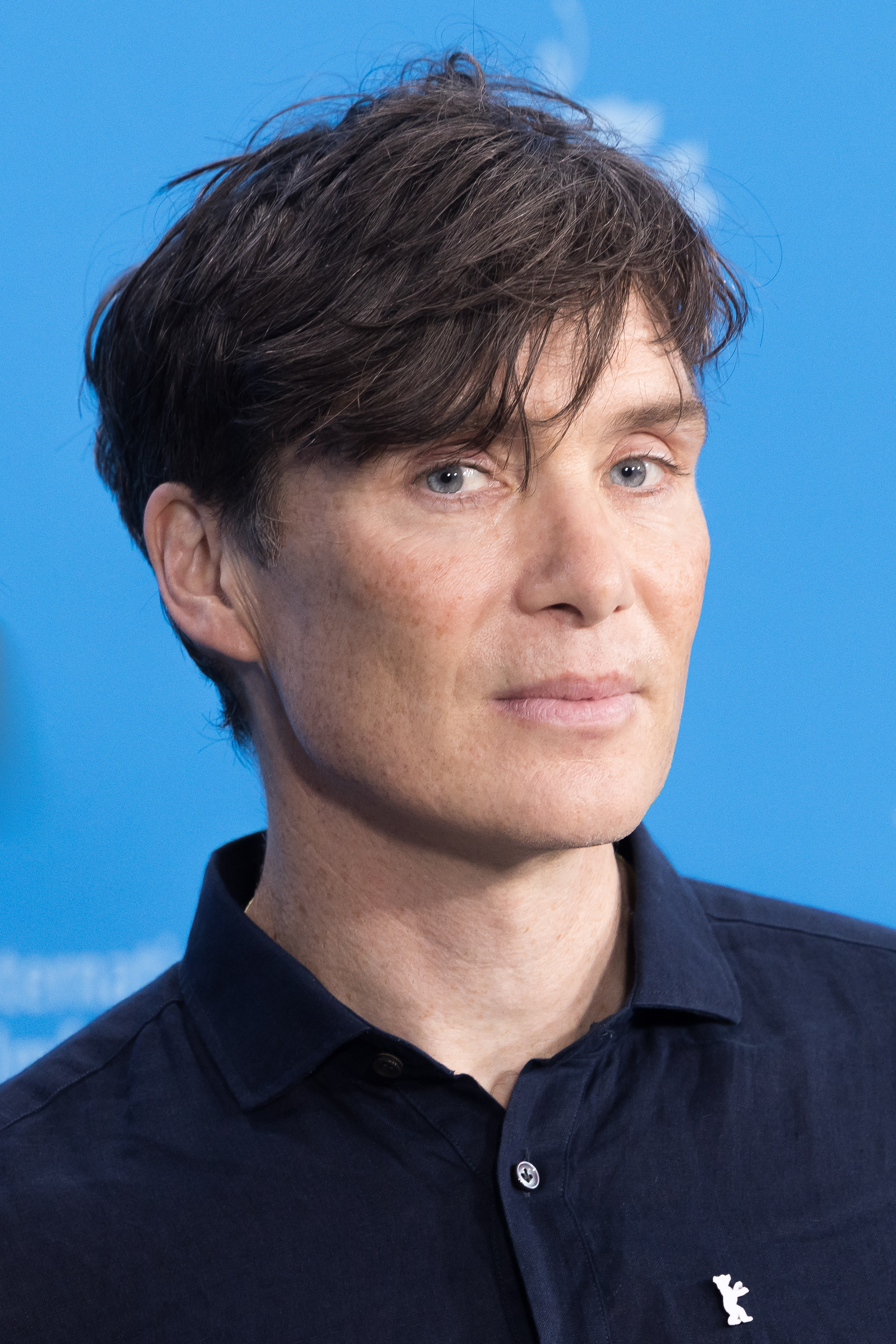
Cillian Murphy won for Oppenheimer (2023).

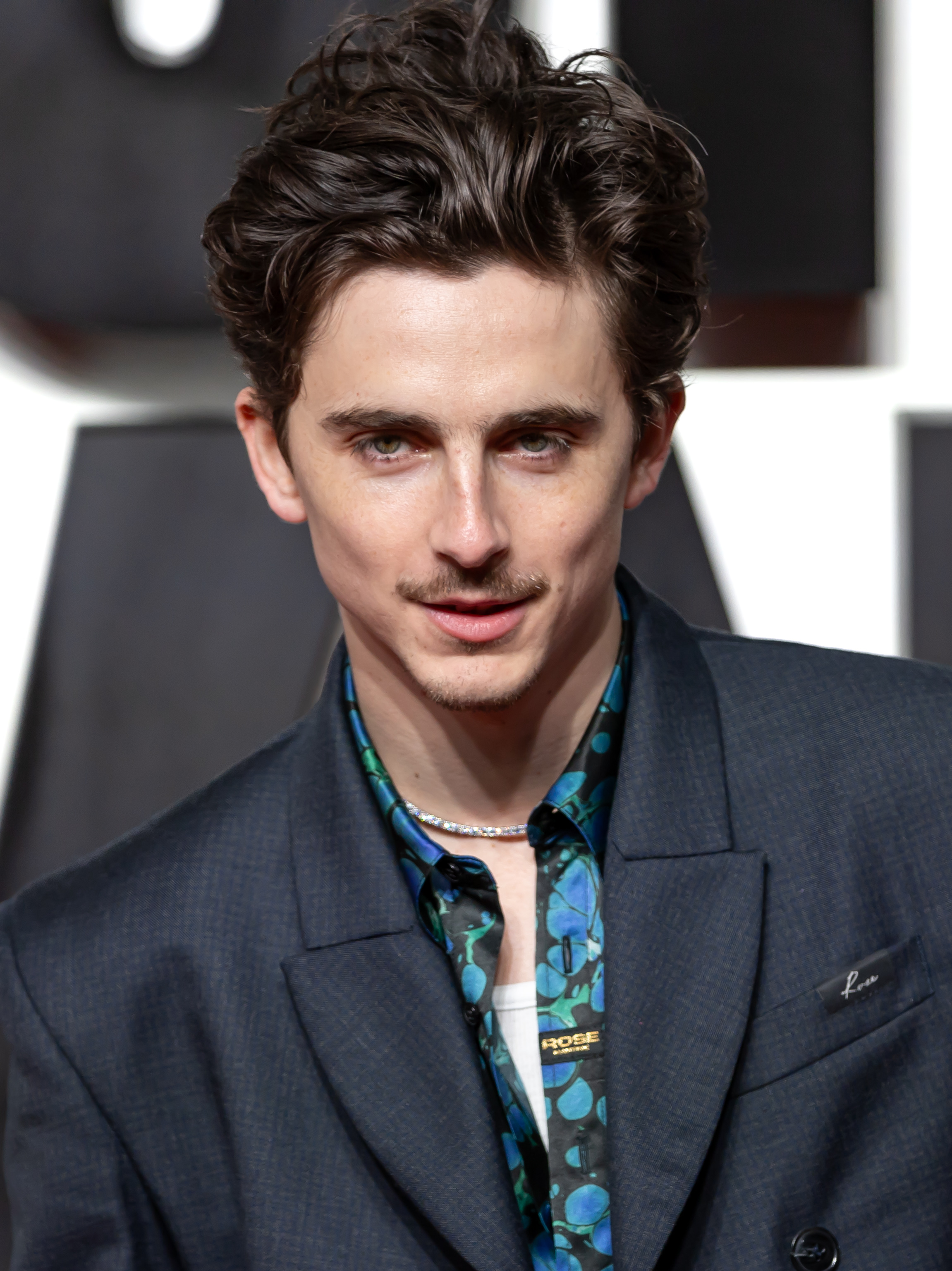
Timothée Chalamet won for A Complete Unknown (2024).

Table key
	Indicates the winner
†	Indicates a posthumous winner
†	Indicates a posthumous nominee
‡	Indicates the Academy Award winner

=== 1990s ===
Year	Actor	Film	Role(s)	Ref.
1994 (1st)	Tom Hanks ‡	Forrest Gump	Forrest Gump	
1994 (1st)	Morgan Freeman	The Shawshank Redemption	Ellis "Red" Redding	
1994 (1st)	Paul Newman	Nobody's Fool	Donald "Sully" Sullivan	
1994 (1st)	Tim Robbins	The Shawshank Redemption	Andy Dufresne	
1994 (1st)	John Travolta	Pulp Fiction	Vincent Vega	
1995 (2nd)	Nicolas Cage ‡	Leaving Las Vegas	Ben Sanderson	
1995 (2nd)	Anthony Hopkins	Nixon	Richard Nixon	
1995 (2nd)	James Earl Jones	Cry, the Beloved Country	Rev. Stephen Kumalo	
1995 (2nd)	Sean Penn	Dead Man Walking	Matthew Poncelet	
1995 (2nd)	Massimo Troisi †	Il Postino: The Postman	Mario Ruoppolo	
1996 (3rd)	Geoffrey Rush ‡	Shine	David Helfgott	
1996 (3rd)	Tom Cruise	Jerry Maguire	Jerry Maguire	
1996 (3rd)	Ralph Fiennes	The English Patient	László Almásy	
1996 (3rd)	Woody Harrelson	The People vs. Larry Flynt	Larry Flynt	
1996 (3rd)	Billy Bob Thornton	Sling Blade	Karl Childers	
1997 (4th)	Jack Nicholson ‡	As Good as It Gets	Melvin Udall	
1997 (4th)	Matt Damon	Good Will Hunting	Will Hunting	
1997 (4th)	Robert Duvall	The Apostle	Euliss "Sonny" Dewey	
1997 (4th)	Peter Fonda	Ulee's Gold	Ulysses "Ulee" Jackson	
1997 (4th)	Dustin Hoffman	Wag the Dog	Stanley Motss	
1998 (5th)	Roberto Benigni ‡	Life Is Beautiful	Guido Orefice	
1998 (5th)	Joseph Fiennes	Shakespeare in Love	William Shakespeare	
1998 (5th)	Tom Hanks	Saving Private Ryan	Capt. John H. Miller	
1998 (5th)	Ian McKellen	Gods and Monsters	James Whale	
1998 (5th)	Nick Nolte	Affliction	Wade Whitehouse	
1999 (6th)	Kevin Spacey ‡	American Beauty	Lester Burnham	
1999 (6th)	Jim Carrey	Man on the Moon	Andy Kaufman	
1999 (6th)	Russell Crowe	The Insider	Jeffrey Wigand	
1999 (6th)	Philip Seymour Hoffman	Flawless	Rusty	
1999 (6th)	Denzel Washington	The Hurricane	Rubin "Hurricane" Carter	

=== 2000s ===
Year	Actor	Film	Role(s)	Ref.
2000 (7th)	Benicio del Toro ‡ won Academy Award for Best Supporting Actor	Traffic	Javier Rodriguez	
2000 (7th)	Jamie Bell	Billy Elliot	Billy Elliot	
2000 (7th)	Russell Crowe ‡	Gladiator	Maximus Decimus Meridius	
2000 (7th)	Tom Hanks	Cast Away	Chuck Noland	
2000 (7th)	Geoffrey Rush	Quills	Marquis de Sade	
2001 (8th)	Russell Crowe	A Beautiful Mind	John Forbes Nash Jr.	
2001 (8th)	Kevin Kline	Life as a House	George Monroe	
2001 (8th)	Sean Penn	I Am Sam	Sam Dawson	
2001 (8th)	Denzel Washington ‡	Training Day	Alonzo Harris	
2001 (8th)	Tom Wilkinson	In the Bedroom	Matt Fowler	
2002 (9th)	Daniel Day-Lewis	Gangs of New York	William "Bill the Butcher" Cutting	
2002 (9th)	Adrien Brody ‡	The Pianist	Władysław "Wladek" Szpilman	
2002 (9th)	Nicolas Cage	Adaptation.	Charlie Kaufman / Donald Kaufman	
2002 (9th)	Richard Gere	Chicago	Billy Flynn	
2002 (9th)	Jack Nicholson	About Schmidt	Warren Schmidt	
2003 (10th)	Johnny Depp	Pirates of the Caribbean: The Curse of the Black Pearl	Captain Jack Sparrow	
2003 (10th)	Peter Dinklage	The Station Agent	Finbar McBride	
2003 (10th)	Ben Kingsley	House of Sand and Fog	Colonel Massoud Amir Behrani	
2003 (10th)	Bill Murray	Lost in Translation	Bob Harris	
2003 (10th)	Sean Penn ‡	Mystic River	Jimmy Markum	
2004 (11th)	Jamie Foxx ‡	Ray	Ray Charles	
2004 (11th)	Don Cheadle	Hotel Rwanda	Paul Rusesabagina	
2004 (11th)	Johnny Depp	Finding Neverland	J. M. Barrie	
2004 (11th)	Leonardo DiCaprio	The Aviator	Howard Hughes	
2004 (11th)	Paul Giamatti	Sideways	Miles Raymond	
2005 (12th)	Philip Seymour Hoffman ‡	Capote	Truman Capote	
2005 (12th)	Russell Crowe	Cinderella Man	Jim Braddock	
2005 (12th)	Heath Ledger	Brokeback Mountain	Ennis Del Mar	
2005 (12th)	Joaquin Phoenix	Walk the Line	Johnny Cash	
2005 (12th)	David Strathairn	Good Night, and Good Luck.	Edward R. Murrow	
2006 (13th)	Forest Whitaker ‡	The Last King of Scotland	Idi Amin	
2006 (13th)	Leonardo DiCaprio	Blood Diamond	Danny Archer	
2006 (13th)	Ryan Gosling	Half Nelson	Dan Dunne	
2006 (13th)	Peter O'Toole	Venus	Maurice Russell	
2006 (13th)	Will Smith	The Pursuit of Happyness	Chris Gardner	
2007 (14th)	Daniel Day-Lewis ‡	There Will Be Blood	Daniel Plainview	
2007 (14th)	George Clooney	Michael Clayton	Michael Clayton	
2007 (14th)	Ryan Gosling	Lars and the Real Girl	Lars Lindstrom	
2007 (14th)	Emile Hirsch	Into the Wild	Christopher McCandless	
2007 (14th)	Viggo Mortensen	Eastern Promises	Nikolai Luzhin	
2008 (15th)	Sean Penn ‡	Milk	Harvey Milk	
2008 (15th)	Richard Jenkins	The Visitor	Walter Vale	
2008 (15th)	Frank Langella	Frost/Nixon	Richard Nixon	
2008 (15th)	Brad Pitt	The Curious Case of Benjamin Button	Benjamin Button	
2008 (15th)	Mickey Rourke	The Wrestler	Randy "The Ram" Robinson	
2009 (16th)	Jeff Bridges ‡	Crazy Heart	Otis "Bad" Blake	
2009 (16th)	George Clooney	Up in the Air	Ryan Bingham	
2009 (16th)	Colin Firth	A Single Man	George Falconer	
2009 (16th)	Morgan Freeman	Invictus	Nelson Mandela	
2009 (16th)	Jeremy Renner	The Hurt Locker	Staff Sgt. First Class William James	

=== 2010s ===
Year	Actor	Film	Role(s)	Ref.
2010 (17th)	Colin Firth ‡	The King's Speech	King George VI	
2010 (17th)	Jeff Bridges	True Grit	Reuben "Rooster" Cogburn	
2010 (17th)	Robert Duvall	Get Low	Felix Bush	
2010 (17th)	Jesse Eisenberg	The Social Network	Mark Zuckerberg	
2010 (17th)	James Franco	127 Hours	Aron Ralston	
2011 (18th)	Jean Dujardin ‡	The Artist	George Valentin	
2011 (18th)	Demián Bichir	A Better Life	Carlos Galindo	
2011 (18th)	George Clooney	The Descendants	Matt King	
2011 (18th)	Leonardo DiCaprio	J. Edgar	J. Edgar Hoover	
2011 (18th)	Brad Pitt	Moneyball	Billy Beane	
2012 (19th)	Daniel Day-Lewis ‡	Lincoln	Abraham Lincoln	
2012 (19th)	Bradley Cooper	Silver Linings Playbook	Patrizio "Pat" Solitano, Jr.	
2012 (19th)	John Hawkes	The Sessions	Mark O'Brien	
2012 (19th)	Hugh Jackman	Les Misérables	Jean Valjean	
2012 (19th)	Denzel Washington	Flight	William "Whip" Whitaker, Sr.	
2013 (20th)	Matthew McConaughey ‡	Dallas Buyers Club	Ron Woodroof	
2013 (20th)	Bruce Dern	Nebraska	Woodrow "Woody" Grant	
2013 (20th)	Chiwetel Ejiofor	12 Years a Slave	Solomon Northup	
2013 (20th)	Tom Hanks	Captain Phillips	Richard Phillips	
2013 (20th)	Forest Whitaker	The Butler	Cecil Gaines	
2014 (21st)	Eddie Redmayne ‡	The Theory of Everything	Stephen Hawking	
2014 (21st)	Steve Carell	Foxcatcher	John Eleuthère du Pont	
2014 (21st)	Benedict Cumberbatch	The Imitation Game	Alan Turing	
2014 (21st)	Jake Gyllenhaal	Nightcrawler	Louis "Lou" Bloom	
2014 (21st)	Michael Keaton	Birdman	Riggan Thomson	
2015 (22nd)	Leonardo DiCaprio ‡	The Revenant	Hugh Glass	
2015 (22nd)	Bryan Cranston	Trumbo	Dalton Trumbo	
2015 (22nd)	Johnny Depp	Black Mass	Whitey Bulger	
2015 (22nd)	Michael Fassbender	Steve Jobs	Steve Jobs	
2015 (22nd)	Eddie Redmayne	The Danish Girl	Lili Elbe / Einar Wegener	
2016 (23rd)	Denzel Washington	Fences	Troy Maxson	
2016 (23rd)	Casey Affleck ‡	Manchester by the Sea	Lee Chandler	
2016 (23rd)	Ryan Gosling	La La Land	Sebastian Wilder	
2016 (23rd)	Andrew Garfield	Hacksaw Ridge	Desmond T. Doss	
2016 (23rd)	Viggo Mortensen	Captain Fantastic	Ben Cash	
2017 (24th)	Gary Oldman ‡	Darkest Hour	Winston Churchill	
2017 (24th)	Timothée Chalamet	Call Me by Your Name	Elio Perlman	
2017 (24th)	James Franco	The Disaster Artist	Tommy Wiseau	
2017 (24th)	Daniel Kaluuya	Get Out	Chris Washington	
2017 (24th)	Denzel Washington	Roman J. Israel, Esq.	Roman J. Israel	
2018 (25th)	Rami Malek ‡	Bohemian Rhapsody	Freddie Mercury	
2018 (25th)	Christian Bale	Vice	Dick Cheney	
2018 (25th)	Bradley Cooper	A Star Is Born	Jackson Maine	
2018 (25th)	Viggo Mortensen	Green Book	Tony Lip	
2018 (25th)	John David Washington	BlacKkKlansman	Ron Stallworth	
2019 (26th)	Joaquin Phoenix ‡	Joker	Arthur Fleck / Joker	
2019 (26th)	Christian Bale	Ford v Ferrari	Ken Miles	
2019 (26th)	Leonardo DiCaprio	Once Upon a Time in Hollywood	Rick Dalton	
2019 (26th)	Adam Driver	Marriage Story	Charlie Barber	
2019 (26th)	Taron Egerton	Rocketman	Elton John	

=== 2020s ===
Year	Actor	Film	Role(s)	Ref.
2020 (27th)	Chadwick Boseman †	Ma Rainey's Black Bottom	Levee Green	
2020 (27th)	Riz Ahmed	Sound of Metal	Ruben Stone	
2020 (27th)	Anthony Hopkins ‡	The Father	Anthony	
2020 (27th)	Gary Oldman	Mank	Herman J. Mankiewicz	
2020 (27th)	Steven Yeun	Minari	Jacob Yi	
2021 (28th)	Will Smith ‡	King Richard	Richard Williams	
2021 (28th)	Javier Bardem	Being the Ricardos	Desi Arnaz	
2021 (28th)	Benedict Cumberbatch	The Power of the Dog	Phil Burbank	
2021 (28th)	Andrew Garfield	Tick, Tick...Boom!	Jonathan Larson	
2021 (28th)	Denzel Washington	The Tragedy of Macbeth	Lord Macbeth	
2022 (29th)	Brendan Fraser ‡	The Whale	Charlie	
2022 (29th)	Austin Butler	Elvis	Elvis Presley	
2022 (29th)	Colin Farrell	The Banshees of Inisherin	Pádraic Súilleabháin	
2022 (29th)	Bill Nighy	Living	Rodney Williams	
2022 (29th)	Adam Sandler	Hustle	Stanley Sugerman	
2023 (30th)	Cillian Murphy ‡	Oppenheimer	J. Robert Oppenheimer	
2023 (30th)	Bradley Cooper	Maestro	Leonard Bernstein	
2023 (30th)	Colman Domingo	Rustin	Bayard Rustin	
2023 (30th)	Paul Giamatti	The Holdovers	Paul Hunham	
2023 (30th)	Jeffrey Wright	American Fiction	Thelonious "Monk" Ellison	
2024 (31st)	Timothée Chalamet	A Complete Unknown	Bob Dylan	
2024 (31st)	Adrien Brody ‡	The Brutalist	László Tóth	
2024 (31st)	Daniel Craig	Queer	William Lee	
2024 (31st)	Colman Domingo	Sing Sing	John "Divine G" Whitfield	
2024 (31st)	Ralph Fiennes	Conclave	Thomas Cardinal Lawrence	
2025 (32nd)	Michael B. Jordan ‡	Sinners	Elijah "Smoke" Moore / Elias "Stack" Moore	
2025 (32nd)	Timothée Chalamet	Marty Supreme	Marty Mauser	
2025 (32nd)	Leonardo DiCaprio	One Battle After Another	Bob Ferguson	
2025 (32nd)	Ethan Hawke	Blue Moon	Lorenz Hart	
2025 (32nd)	Jesse Plemons	Bugonia	Teddy Gatz	

== Superlatives ==
Superlative	Leading Actor		Supporting Actor		Overall	
Actor with most awards	Daniel Day-Lewis	3	Mahershala Ali	2	Daniel Day-Lewis	3
Actor with most nominations	Leonardo DiCaprio, Denzel Washington	6	Chris Cooper, Willem Dafoe, Jared Leto	3	Leonardo DiCaprio	7
Actor with most nominations without ever winning	George Clooney, Bradley Cooper, Ryan Gosling, Viggo Mortensen	3	Chris Cooper, Willem Dafoe	3	George Clooney, Ryan Gosling	4
Film with most nominations	The Shawshank Redemption	2	The Banshees of Inisherin, The Birdcage, The Contender, Crash, The Irishman, No Country for Old Men, One Battle After Another, Three Billboards Outside Ebbing, Missouri	2	The Banshees of Inisherin, One Battle After Another	3
Oldest Winner	Denzel Washington (Fences, 2017)	62	Christopher Plummer (Beginners, 2012)	82	Christopher Plummer (Beginners, 2012)	82
Oldest Nominee	Anthony Hopkins (The Father, 2021)	83	Robert Duvall (The Judge, 2015)	83	Robert Duvall (The Judge, 2015)	83
Youngest Winner	Timothée Chalamet (A Complete Unknown, 2025)	29	Heath Ledger (The Dark Knight, 2009)	28	Heath Ledger (The Dark Knight, 2009)	28
Youngest Nominee	Jamie Bell (Billy Elliot, 2001)	14	Jacob Tremblay (Room, 2016)	9	Jacob Tremblay (Room, 2016)	9

== Multiple winners ==
Three wins

- Daniel Day-Lewis (2002, 2007, 2012)

== Multiple nominees ==
Note: Winners are indicated in bold type.

Two nominations

- Christian Bale (Vice (2018), Ford v Ferrari (2019))
- Jeff Bridges (**Crazy Heart** (2009), True Grit (2010))
- Adrien Brody (The Pianist (2002), The Brutalist (2024))
- Nicolas Cage (**Leaving Las Vegas** (1995), Adaptation. (2002))
- Benedict Cumberbatch (The Imitation Game (2014), The Power of the Dog (2021))
- Colman Domingo (Rustin (2023), Sing Sing (2024))
- Robert Duvall (The Apostle (1997), Get Low (2010))
- Ralph Fiennes (The English Patient (1996), Conclave (2024))
- Colin Firth (A Single Man (2009), **The King's Speech** (2010))
- James Franco (127 Hours (2010), The Disaster Artist (2017))
- Morgan Freeman (The Shawshank Redemption (1994), Invictus (2009))
- Andrew Garfield (Hacksaw Ridge (2016), Tick, Tick... Boom! (2021))
- Paul Giamatti (Sideways (2004), The Holdovers (2023))
- Philip Seymour Hoffman (Flawless (1999), **Capote** (2005))
- Anthony Hopkins (Nixon (1995), The Father (2020))
- Jack Nicholson (**As Good as It Gets** (1997), About Schmidt (2002))
- Gary Oldman (**The Darkest Hour** (2017), Mank (2020))
- Eddie Redmayne (**The Theory of Everything** (2014), The Danish Girl (2015))
- Joaquin Phoenix (Walk the Line (2005), **Joker** (2019))
- Brad Pitt (The Curious Case of Benjamin Button (2008), Moneyball (2011))
- Geoffrey Rush (**Shine** (1996), Quills (2000))
- Will Smith (The Pursuit of Happyness (2006), **King Richard** (2021))
- Forest Whitaker (**The Last King of Scotland** (2006), The Butler (2013))

Three nominations

- Timothée Chalamet (Call Me by Your Name (2017), **A Complete Unknown** (2024), Marty Supreme (2025))
- George Clooney (Michael Clayton (2007), Up in the Air (2009), The Descendants (2011))
- Bradley Cooper (Silver Linings Playbook (2012), A Star is Born (2018), Maestro (2023))
- Daniel Day-Lewis (**Gangs of New York** (2002), **There Will Be Blood** (2007), **Lincoln** (2012))
- Johnny Depp (**Pirates of the Caribbean: The Curse of the Black Pearl** (2003), Finding Neverland (2004), Black Mass (2015))
- Ryan Gosling (Half Nelson (2006), Lars and the Real Girl (2007), La La Land (2016))
- Viggo Mortensen (Eastern Promises (2007), Captain Fantastic (2016), Green Book (2018))

Four nominations

- Russell Crowe (The Insider (1999), Gladiator (2000), **A Beautiful Mind** (2001), Cinderella Man (2005))
- Tom Hanks (**Forrest Gump** (1994), Saving Private Ryan (1998), Cast Away (2000), Captain Phillips (2013))
- Sean Penn (Dead Man Walking (1995), I Am Sam (2001), Mystic River (2003), **Milk** (2008))

Six nominations

- Leonardo DiCaprio (The Aviator (2004), Blood Diamond (2006), J. Edgar (2011), **The Revenant** (2015), Once Upon a Time in Hollywood (2019), One Battle After Another (2025))
- Denzel Washington (The Hurricane (1999), Training Day (2001), Flight (2012), **Fences** (2016), Roman J. Israel, Esq. (2017), The Tragedy of Macbeth (2021))

== See also ==
- Academy Award for Best Actor
- Golden Globe Award for Best Actor in a Motion Picture – Drama
- Golden Globe Award for Best Actor in a Motion Picture – Musical or Comedy
- BAFTA Award for Best Actor in a Leading Role
- Critics' Choice Movie Award for Best Actor
- Independent Spirit Award for Best Lead Performance
