= Angella Reid =

American political staffer

10th White House Chief Usher
- In office October 4, 2011 – May 5, 2017
- President: Barack Obama; Donald Trump
- Preceded by: Stephen W. Rochon
- Succeeded by: Timothy Harleth

Personal details
- Born: Saint Thomas Parish, Jamaica

Angella Reid is an American political staffer who served as the White House Chief Usher from October 2011, in the Obama administration, until her dismissal in May 2017 under the Trump administration. She was the first woman to hold the position.

As White House chief usher, Reid was responsible for managing White House operations in collaboration with several organizations, including the White House Historical Association, the Committee for the Preservation of the White House, the U.S. Commission of Fine Arts, the White House Curator, and the National Park Service.

Reid was recognized at the 2012 Grio Awards.

She was dismissed as chief usher in May 2017. The abrupt firing was unusual for the position, which does not typically change with administrations.

== Biography ==
Reid was born in Saint Thomas Parish, Jamaica, and attended high school in Kingston, Jamaica, before migrating to the United States.

Before becoming the White House chief usher, Reid had more than 25 years' experience in hotel management with Ritz-Carlton, a subsidiary of Marriott International, managing properties in Miami, Florida; Washington, D.C., and Arlington County, Virginia.
