= Gary J. Walters =

American U.S. Secret Service agent

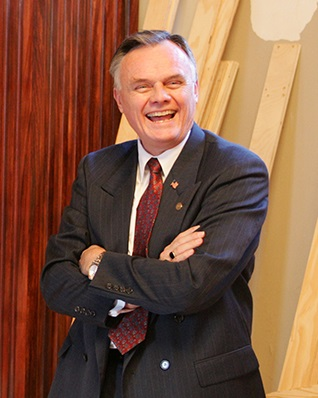
- Gary J. Walters in 2005

8th White House Chief Usher
- In office March(?) 1986 – January 31, 2007
- President: Ronald Reagan; George H. W. Bush; Bill Clinton; George W. Bush
- Preceded by: Rex Scouten
- Succeeded by: Stephen W. Rochon

Gary J. Walters is a former White House Chief Usher, appointed by President Ronald Reagan in 1986 and serving until 2007, serving under four US Presidents.

Walters graduated from the University of Maryland and served as an officer in the United States Army.

From 1970 to 1975, he was a part of the United States Secret Service detail to the President. He then was appointed Assistant Usher at the White House in 1976.

Walters was promoted to Chief Usher about March 1986. The Charlotte Post wrote that he described his position as, "an all-encompassing job that requires understanding the likes and dislikes of the first family, learning the ways of a tradition-steeped White House, and interacting with a multitude of outside organizations such as the historical association and the U.S. Commission of Fine Arts". He retired as of January 31, 2007.
