= The Butler =

2013 American historical drama film by Lee Daniels

- Theatrical release poster
- Directed by: Lee Daniels
- Written by: Danny Strong
- Based on: "A Butler Well Served By This Election" by Wil Haygood
- Produced by: Pamela Oas Williams; Laura Ziskin; Lee Daniels; Buddy Patrick; Cassian Elwes
- Starring: Forest Whitaker; Oprah Winfrey; Mariah Carey; John Cusack; Jane Fonda; Cuba Gooding Jr.; Terrence Howard; Lenny Kravitz; James Marsden; David Oyelowo; Vanessa Redgrave; Alan Rickman; Liev Schreiber; Robin Williams; Clarence Williams III
- Cinematography: Andrew Dunn
- Edited by: Joe Klotz
- Music by: Rodrigo Leão
- Production companies: Laura Ziskin Productions; Windy Hill Pictures; Follow Through Productions; Salamander Pictures; Pam Williams Productions
- Distributed by: The Weinstein Company
- Release date: August 16, 2013
- Running time: 133 minutes
- Country: United States
- Language: English
- Budget: $30 million
- Box office: $177.3 million

The Butler (full title Lee Daniels' The Butler) is a 2013 American historical drama film directed and co-produced by Lee Daniels and written by Danny Strong. It is inspired by Wil Haygood's Washington Post article "A Butler Well Served by This Election".

Loosely based on the real life of Eugene Allen, who worked in the White House for decades, the film stars Forest Whitaker as Cecil Gaines, an African American who is a witness of notable political and social events of the 20th century during his 34-year tenure serving as a White House butler. In addition to Whitaker, the film's ensemble cast features Oprah Winfrey, Mariah Carey, John Cusack, Nelsan Ellis, Jane Fonda, Cuba Gooding Jr., Terrence Howard, Minka Kelly, Elijah Kelley, Lenny Kravitz, James Marsden, David Oyelowo, Alex Pettyfer, Vanessa Redgrave, Alan Rickman, Liev Schreiber, Robin Williams and Clarence Williams III. It was the last film produced by Laura Ziskin, who died on June 12, 2011. It was also the final film appearance of Clarence Williams III, who retired from acting in 2018 and died on June 4, 2021.

The film was theatrically released by the Weinstein Company on August 16, 2013, to mostly positive reviews from critics, with many praising the cast but criticizing the historical accuracy. The film was a commercial success, grossing more than $177 million worldwide against a budget of $30 million.

== Plot ==
In 2009, an elderly Cecil Gaines recounts his life story while waiting at the White House to meet the newly inaugurated president. Cecil was born and raised on a cotton plantation in Macon, Georgia to Black sharecroppers, while the Jim Crow laws still existed. In 1926, when Cecil was seven, the white landowner, Thomas Westfall, rapes Cecil's mulatto mother, Hattie. Cecil's father, Earl, confronts Thomas and is killed by him. Cecil is taken in by Thomas' elderly mother, Annabeth, who is also the estate's matron. Annabeth trains Cecil to be a house servant.

In 1937, at age 18, Cecil leaves the plantation. Desperately hungry, he breaks into a hotel pastry shop. The elderly master-servant Maynard takes pity on him and gives him a job. Cecil learns advanced serving and interpersonal skills from Maynard, who later recommends Cecil for a position in a Washington, D.C., hotel. While working there, Cecil meets and marries Gloria, and the couple have two sons, Louis and Charlie.

In 1957, Cecil is hired by the White House during Dwight D. Eisenhower's administration. White House maître d'hôtel Freddie Fallows introduces him to head butler Carter Wilson and co-worker James Holloway. Cecil witnesses Eisenhower's reluctance to use troops to enforce school desegregation, then his resolve to uphold the law by racially desegregating Little Rock Central High School in Arkansas.

Louis, the Gaineses' elder son, becomes a university student at Fisk University in Nashville, Tennessee, although Cecil feels that the South is too volatile. Louis joins the Southern Christian Leadership Conference (SCLC), activist James Lawson's student program, which leads to a nonviolent sit-in at a segregated diner, where he is arrested. Gloria, who feels that Cecil puts his job ahead of her, descends into alcoholism.

In 1961, after John F. Kennedy's inauguration, Louis and others are attacked by members of the Ku Klux Klan while on a freedom ride to Birmingham, Alabama. Louis participates in the 1963 Birmingham Children's Crusade, where dogs and water cannons are used to stop the marchers, an action that inspires Kennedy to deliver a national address proposing the Civil Rights Act of 1964.

After Kennedy is assassinated in 1963, his successor, Lyndon B. Johnson, enacts the legislation. As a goodwill gesture, Jackie Kennedy gives Cecil one of the former president's neckties.

Louis participates in the 1965 Selma Voting Rights Movement, which inspires Johnson to demand that Congress enact the landmark Voting Rights Act of 1965. Johnson also gives Cecil a tie bar.

In 1968, after civil rights activist Martin Luther King Jr.'s assassination, Louis tells his family that he has joined the Black Panthers. Cecil orders Louis and his girlfriend to leave his house. Louis is again arrested. Cecil becomes aware of President Richard Nixon's plans to suppress the Black Panthers.

Charlie confides to Louis that he plans to join the war in Vietnam. After enlisting, he is killed and buried at Arlington National Cemetery. When the Black Panthers resort to violence, Louis leaves the organization and returns to college, earning his master's degree in political science and eventually running for a seat in Congress, although Cecil continues to resent him.

In 1986, Cecil repeatedly approaches his white supervisor at the White House over the unequal pay and career advancement provided to the Black White House staff. With President Ronald Reagan's support, Cecil prevails, his reputation growing to the point that he and his wife are invited by the Reagans to be guests at a state dinner. Cecil becomes uncomfortable with the class divisions in the White House. After witnessing Reagan's refusal to support economic sanctions against South Africa for apartheid one month before the sanctions are imposed by Congress, he resigns.

Gloria encourages Cecil to mend his relationship with Louis. Realizing that his son's actions are heroic, he joins him at a protest against South African apartheid, but they are arrested and jailed together.

In 2008, Gloria dies shortly before Barack Obama is elected as the nation's first Black president. Two months, two weeks and one day later, Cecil prepares to meet the newly inaugurated President, wearing the articles that he received from Kennedy and Johnson. White House Chief Usher Stephen W. Rochon approaches him, telling him that the president is ready and preparing to show him the way to the Oval Office. Cecil tells him that he knows the way and walks down the hall to the office.

== Cast ==
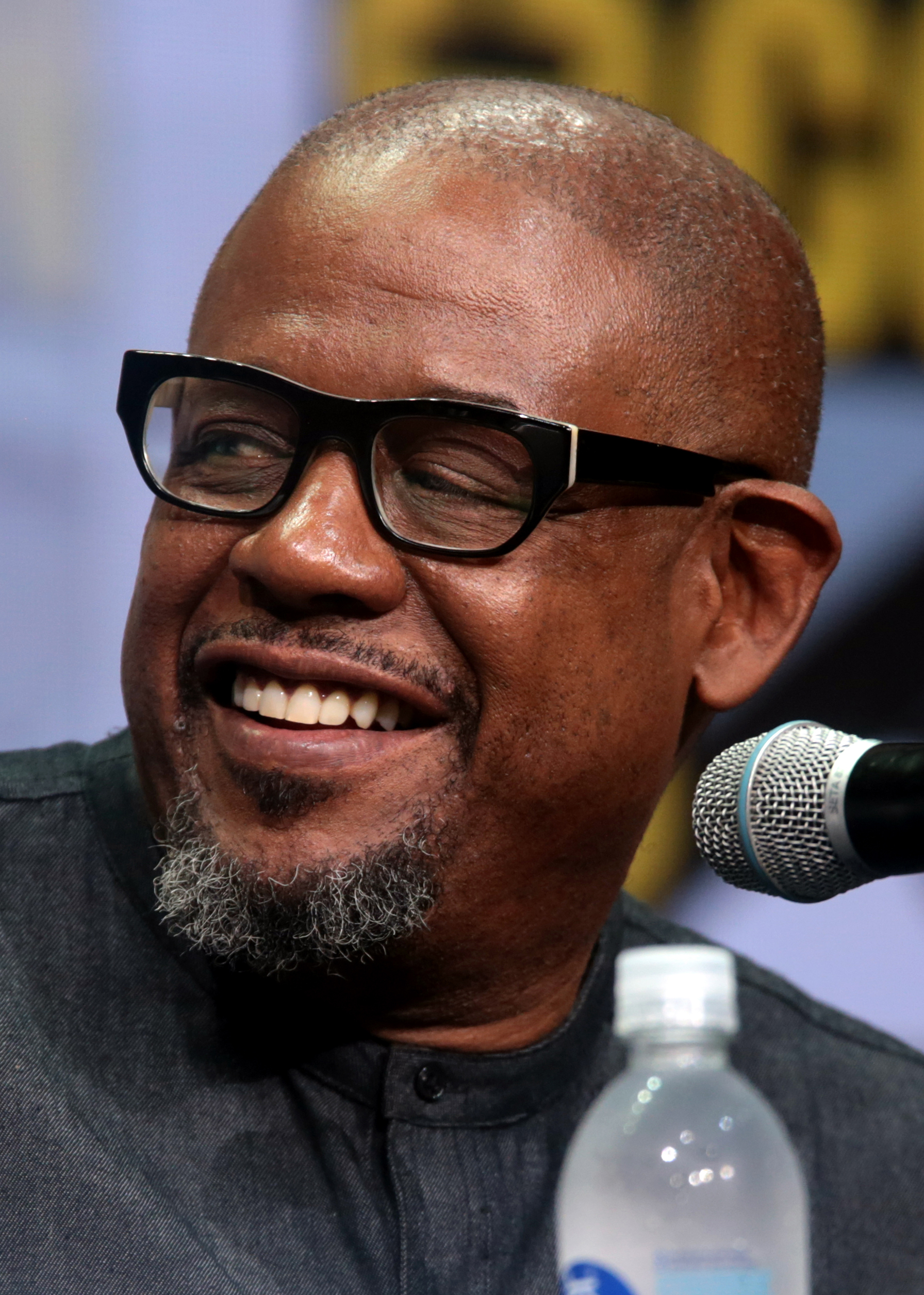
Forest Whitaker portrays Cecil Gaines in The Butler

- Forest Whitaker as Cecil Gaines, the film's main character, who dedicates his life to becoming a professional domestic worker ever since he was 7 years old. He is based on real life American waiter and butler Eugene Allen.
  - Michael Rainey Jr. and Aml Ameen portray Cecil at ages 7 and 18, respectively.

Gaines's private life

- Oprah Winfrey as Gloria Gaines, Cecil Gaines's wife.
- David Oyelowo as Louis Gaines, the Gaineses' elder son.
- Elijah Kelley as Charlie Gaines, the Gaineses' younger son.
  - Isaac White portrays him at age 10.
- Alex Pettyfer as Thomas Westfall, the brutal plantation owner who kills Earl after raping Hattie.
- David Banner as Earl Gaines, Cecil's father and a sharecropper.
- Mariah Carey as Hattie Pearl, Cecil's mother and a sharecropper.
- Terrence Howard as Howard, the Gaineses' neighbor who romantically pursues Gloria.
- Adriane Lenox as Gina, Howard's wife.
- Yaya DaCosta as Carol Hammie, Louis's girlfriend.
- Vanessa Redgrave as Annabeth Westfall, Thomas Westfall's elderly mother and a matron on the plantation.
- Clarence Williams III as Maynard, an elderly man who mentors young Cecil and introduces him to his profession.

White House co-workers

- Cuba Gooding Jr. as Carter Wilson, the fast-talking head butler at the White House, with whom Cecil forms a close friendship.
- Lenny Kravitz as James Holloway, a co-worker butler of Cecil's at the White House.
- Colman Domingo as Freddie Fallows, the White House maitre d' who hires Cecil.

White House historical figures

- Robin Williams as Dwight D. Eisenhower, the 34th President of the United States.
- James DuMont as Sherman Adams, Eisenhower's White House Chief of Staff.
- Robert Aberdeen as Herbert Brownell Jr., Eisenhower's Attorney General.
- James Marsden as John F. Kennedy, the 35th President of the United States.
- Minka Kelly as First Lady Jacqueline Kennedy.
- Liev Schreiber as Lyndon B. Johnson, the 36th President of the United States.
- John Cusack as Richard Nixon, the 37th President of the United States.
- Alex Manette as H. R. Haldeman, Nixon's White House Chief of Staff.
- Colin Walker as John Ehrlichman, Nixon's White House Counsel.
- Alan Rickman as Ronald Reagan, the 40th President of the United States.
- Jane Fonda as First Lady Nancy Reagan.
- Stephen Rider as Stephen W. Rochon, Barack Obama's White House Chief Usher.

Civil rights historical figures

- Nelsan Ellis as Martin Luther King Jr.
- Jesse Williams as civil rights activist James Lawson.
- Danny Strong, the film's screenwriter, appears as a Freedom Bus journalist.

Presidents Gerald Ford, Jimmy Carter, Barack Obama and civil rights leader Jesse Jackson are depicted in archival footage.

Melissa Leo and Orlando Eric Street were cast as First Lady Mamie Eisenhower and Barack Obama, respectively, but did not appear in the finished film.

== Production ==
=== Development ===
Danny Strong's screenplay is inspired by Wil Haygood's Washington Post article "A Butler Well Served by This Election". The project received initial backing in early 2011 when producers Laura Ziskin and Pam Williams approached Sheila Johnson for help financing the film. After reading Danny Strong's screenplay, Johnson invested $2.7 million before bringing in several African American investors. However, Ziskin died from cancer in June 2011. This left director Daniels and producing partner Hilary Shor to look further for producers. They started with Cassian Elwes, with whom they were working on The Paperboy. Elwes joined the list of producers and began fundraising for the film.

In spring 2012, AI Film, a British financing and production company, added a $6 million guarantee against foreign pre-sales. Finally, the film raised its requisite $30 million budget through 41 producers and executive producers, including Earl W. Stafford, Harry I. Martin Jr., Brett Johnson, Michael Finley and Buddy Patrick. Thereafter, as film production started, Weinstein Co. picked up U.S. distribution rights for the film. David Glasser, Weinstein Co. COO, called fundraising as an independent film "a story that's a movie within itself".

The Weinstein Company acquired the distribution rights for the film after Columbia Pictures put the film in turnaround.

The film's title was up for a possible renaming due to a Motion Picture Association claim from Warner Bros., which had inherited from the defunct Lubin Company a now-lost 1916 silent short film with the same name. The case was subsequently resolved with the MPAA granting The Weinstein Company permission to add Lee Daniels in front of the title, under the condition that his name was "75% the size of The Butler". On July 23, 2013, the distributor unveiled a revised poster, displaying the title as Lee Daniels' The Butler.

=== Filming ===
Principal photography started in June 2012 in New Orleans. Interior White House scenes were shot at Second Line Stages. Production was originally scheduled to wrap in early August 2012 but was delayed by the impact of Hurricane Isaac.

== Reception ==
=== Box office ===
In its opening weekend, the film debuted in first place, with $24.6 million. The film topped the North American box office in its first three consecutive weeks. The film has grossed $116.6 million in Canada and the United States, and it earned $60.7 million elsewhere, for a total of $177.3 million.

=== Critical response ===
The Butler received generally positive reviews from critics. On Rotten Tomatoes, it has a 72% rating, based on 199 reviews, with an average score of 6.60/10. The site's consensus says: "Gut-wrenching and emotionally affecting, Lee Daniels' The Butler overcomes an uneven narrative thanks to strong performances from an all-star cast." On Metacritic, it has a weighted average score of 65 based on 47 reviews, indicating "generally positive" reviews. Audiences surveyed by CinemaScore gave the film an "A" on a scale of A+ to F.

Todd McCarthy of The Hollywood Reporter praised the film, saying, "Even with all contrivances and obvious point-making and familiar historical signposting, Daniels' The Butler is always engaging, often entertaining and certainly never dull."

Richard Roeper lauded the film's casting, remarking that "Forest Whitaker gives the performance of his career".

Rolling Stone also spoke highly of Whitaker, writing that his "reflective, powerfully understated performance...fills this flawed film with potency and purpose".

Variety wrote that "Daniels develops a strong sense of the inner complexities and contradictions of the civil-rights landscape".

USA Today gave the film three stars out of four, and noted, "It's inspiring and filled with fine performances, but the insistently swelling musical score and melodramatic moments seem calculated and undercut a powerful story".

Kenneth Turan of the Los Angeles Times was more negative: "An ambitious and overdue attempt to create a Hollywood-style epic around the experience of black Americans in general and the civil rights movement in particular, it undercuts itself by hitting its points squarely on the nose with a 9-pound hammer." Several critics compared the film's historical anecdotes and sentimentality to Forrest Gump.

President Barack Obama said, "I teared up thinking about not just the butlers who worked here in the White House, but an entire generation of people who were talented and skilled. But because of Jim Crow and because of discrimination, there was only so far they could go."

=== Accolades ===
List of awards and nominations received by The Butler
| Award | Category | Recipients | Result |
|---|---|---|---|
| AARP Annual Movies for Grownups Awards | Best Supporting Actress | Oprah Winfrey | Won |
| BAFTA Awards | Best Actress in a Supporting Role | Oprah Winfrey | Nominated |
| BAFTA Awards | BAFTA Award for Best Makeup and Hair | Debra Denson, Beverly Jo Pryor, Candace Neal | Nominated |
| Hollywood Film Awards | Best Director | Lee Daniels | Won |
| Hollywood Film Awards | Spotlight | David Oyelowo | Won |
| Critics Choice Awards | Best Supporting Actress | Oprah Winfrey | Nominated |
| Critics Choice Awards | Best Cast | Mariah Carey, John Cusack, Jane Fonda, Cuba Gooding Jr., Terrence Howard, Lenny Kravitz, James Marsden, David Oyelowo, Alex Pettyfer, Vanessa Redgrave, Alan Rickman, Liev Schreiber, Forest Whitaker, Robin Williams, and Oprah Winfrey | Nominated |
| Critics Choice Awards | Best Makeup | | Nominated |
| NAACP Image Award | Outstanding Motion Picture | | Nominated |
| NAACP Image Award | Outstanding Actor in a Motion Picture | Forest Whitaker | Won |
| NAACP Image Award | Outstanding Supporting Actor in a Motion Picture | David Oyelowo | Won |
| NAACP Image Award | Outstanding Supporting Actor in a Motion Picture | Cuba Gooding Jr. | Nominated |
| NAACP Image Award | Outstanding Supporting Actor in a Motion Picture | Terrence Howard | Nominated |
| NAACP Image Award | Outstanding Supporting Actress in a Motion Picture | Oprah Winfrey | Nominated |
| NAACP Image Award | Outstanding Writing in a Motion Picture | Danny Strong | Nominated |
| NAACP Image Award | Outstanding Directing in a Motion Picture | Lee Daniels | Nominated |
| People's Choice Awards | Favorite Dramatic Movie | | Nominated |
| People's Choice Awards | Favorite Dramatic Movie Actress | Oprah Winfrey | Nominated |
| Phoenix Film Critics Society | Best Actress in a Supporting Role | Oprah Winfrey | Nominated |
| Screen Actors Guild Award | Outstanding Performance by a Cast in a Motion Picture | Mariah Carey, John Cusack, Jane Fonda, Cuba Gooding Jr., Terrence Howard, Lenny Kravitz, James Marsden, David Oyelowo, Alex Pettyfer, Vanessa Redgrave, Alan Rickman, Liev Schreiber, Forest Whitaker, Robin Williams, and Oprah Winfrey | Nominated |
| Screen Actors Guild Award | Outstanding Performance by a Male Actor in a Leading Role | Forest Whitaker | Nominated |
| Screen Actors Guild Award | Outstanding Performance by a Female Actor in a Supporting Role | Oprah Winfrey | Nominated |
| Satellite Awards | Best Actor in a Motion Picture | Forest Whitaker | Nominated |
| Satellite Awards | Best Actress in Supporting Role | Oprah Winfrey | Nominated |
| Satellite Awards | Best Art Direction & Production Design | Diane Lederman, Tim Galvin | Nominated |

=== Historical accuracy ===
Regarding historical accuracy, Eliana Dockterman wrote in Time: "Allen was born on a Virginia plantation in 1919, not in Georgia.... In the movie, Cecil' Gaines grows up on a cotton field in Macon, where his family comes into conflict with the white farmers for whom they work. What befalls his parents on the cotton field was added for dramatic effect.... Though tension between father and son over civil rights issues fuels most of the drama in the film, [Eugene Allen's son] Charles Allen was not the radical political activist that Gaines's son is in the movie."

The film also excluded Billy Graham from Eisenhower's meeting regarding the sending of troops to Arkansas to aid the Little Rock Nine. By 1992, Christian Century acknowledged that Graham in fact had a vital role in persuading Eisenhower's to go along with this decision.

The film also falsely portrayed Lyndon Johnson as initially being reluctant to support the Selma Movement. A phone conversation between Johnson and Martin Luther King Jr. on January 15, 1965, showed that King privately conspired with Johnson and that Johnson sought to use the Movement to advance the Voting Rights Act of 1965 and other legislation through Congress.

Particular criticism has been directed at the film's accuracy in portraying President Ronald Reagan. While Alan Rickman's performance generated positive reviews, conservative activists criticized the director and screenwriters of the film for depicting Reagan as indifferent to civil rights and reluctant to associate with the White House's Black employees during his presidency. According to Michael Reagan, the former president's son and a conservative activist, "The real story of the White House butler doesn't imply racism at all. It's simply Hollywood liberals wanting to believe something about my father that was never there."

Paul Kengor, one of President Reagan's biographers, also attacked the film, saying, "I've talked to many White House staff, cooks, housekeepers, doctors, and Secret Service over the years. They are universal in their love of Ronald Reagan." Regarding the president's initial opposition to sanctions against apartheid in South Africa, Kengor said, "Ronald Reagan was appalled by apartheid, but also wanted to ensure that if the apartheid regime collapsed in South Africa that it wasn't replaced by a Marxist-totalitarian regime allied with Moscow and Cuba that would take the South African people down the same road as Ethiopia, Mozambique, and, yes, Cuba. In the immediate years before Reagan became president, 11 countries from the Third World, from Asia to Africa to Latin America, went Communist. It was devastating. If the film refuses to deal with this issue with the necessary balance, it shouldn't deal with it at all."

== See also ==
- Backstairs at the White House, a 1979 miniseries with a similar theme
- Civil rights movement in popular culture
- Great Migration
- List of black films of the 2010s
