= Stephen W. Rochon =

White House Chief Usher

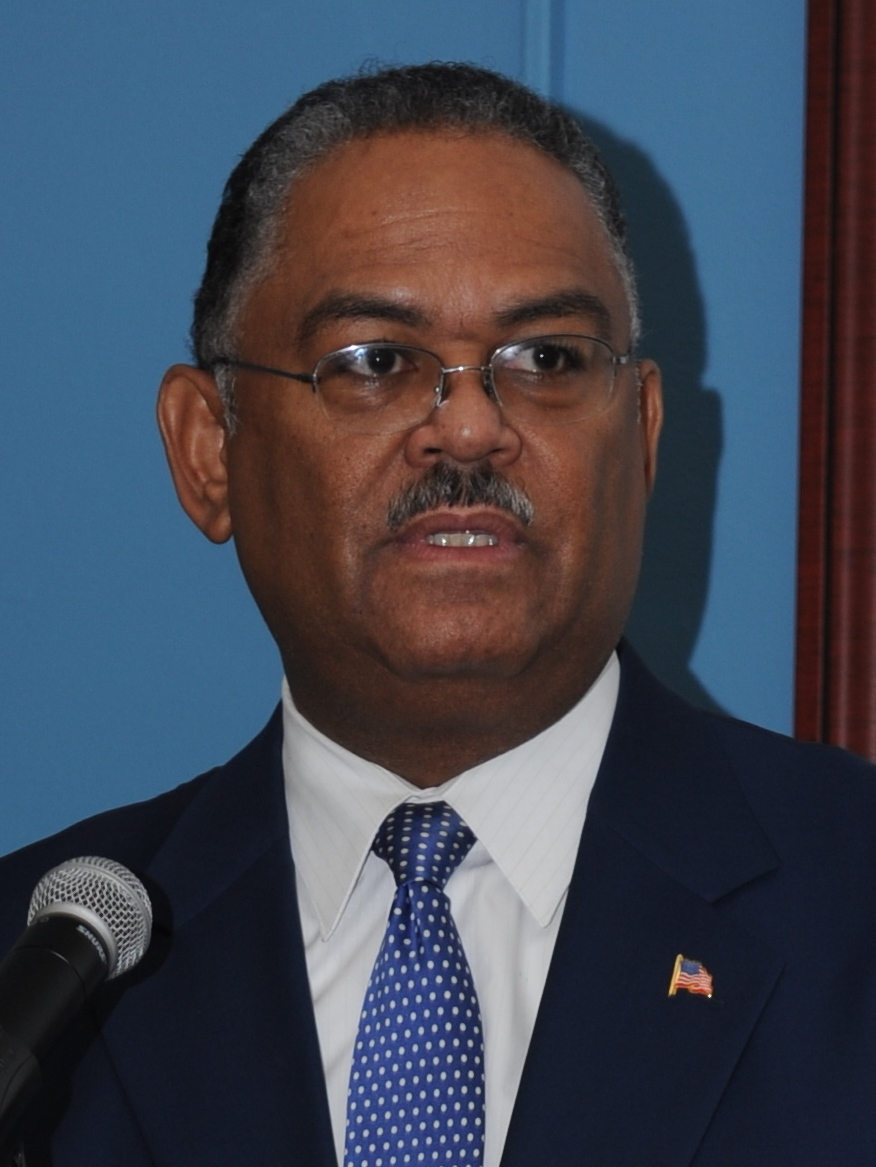

9th White House Chief Usher
- In office March 12, 2007 – 2011
- President: George W. Bush; Barack Obama
- Preceded by: Gary J. Walters
- Succeeded by: Angella Reid

Personal details
- Education: Xavier University of Louisiana; National Defense University
- Military career
- Allegiance: United States
- Branch: United States Coast Guard
- Service years: 1970–2007
- Rank: Rear Admiral

Stephen Wayne Rochon is an American political staffer who served as the director of the Executive Residence and White House Chief Usher from 2007 to 2011. He was the first African-American White House Chief Usher.

Rochon served his last day on active duty as a rear admiral with the Coast Guard on March 9, 2007, and began his service at the White House on March 12. Rochon succeeded Gary J. Walters, who retired in January 2007 after 20 years as White House Chief Usher.

Rochon resigned as chief usher in 2011 to work in the United States Department of Homeland Security and was replaced as chief usher by Angella Reid on October 5, 2011.

== Biography ==
=== Education ===
Rochon holds a B.S. in business administration from Xavier University of Louisiana and a M.S. in national resource strategy from the National Defense University.

=== Coast Guard career ===
Admiral Rochon enlisted in the Coast Guard in 1970. He rose through the enlisted ranks and received a commission as an ensign in 1975 from the Officer Candidate School at Yorktown, Virginia.

As the Coast Guard's commander of the Maintenance and Logistics Command Atlantic, Admiral Rochon was responsible for naval and civil engineering, financial management, personnel, legal, civil rights, electronic systems support, and contingency planning across 40 U.S. states, Puerto Rico, Europe, and the Middle East.

A New Orleans native, Admiral Rochon served as the Coast Guard's director of personnel management in the aftermath of the 2005 hurricanes, providing support for Coast Guard personnel and their families, and ensuring they had housing and new job assignments. Admiral Rochon has a passion for history and historic preservation. He produced video documentaries in 1989 and 2005 honoring Alex Haley, USCG (Ret) and author of "Roots." Admiral Rochon also spearheaded the posthumous awarding of the Gold Lifesaving Medal to the African American crew of the Pea Island Life-Saving Station for a daring rescue in 1896 near the Outer Banks of North Carolina. He has contributed his expertise to a number of museums across the United States, from Louisiana to Connecticut. Admiral Rochon helped rebuild and preserve the historic significance of three turn-of-the-century homes in New Orleans following the 2005 hurricanes.

=== White House ===
Rochon was appointed chief usher at the White House, beginning his tenure on March 12, 2007. He was the first African American to hold the position. Rochon resigned in May 2011 to take a position at the United States Department of Homeland Security.

== Awards ==
Admiral Rochon has earned three Legion of Merit medals. He has also received numerous civic and community leadership awards.

A White House lawn picnic table is dedicated to Admiral Rochon.

== Personal life ==
Rochon is Catholic and attends Saint Joseph Catholic Church in Alexandria, Virginia.

He also served as a consultant for the 2013 movie The Butler.
