= Wil Haygood =

American journalist and author (born 1954)

- Born: September 19, 1954 (age 72); Columbus, Ohio, U.S.
- Education: Miami University

Wil Haygood (born September 19, 1954, in Columbus, Ohio) is an American journalist and author who is known for his 2008 article "A Butler Well Served by this Election" in The Washington Post about Eugene Allen, which served as the basis for the 2013 movie The Butler. Since then, Haygood has written a book about Allen, The Butler: A Witness to History. While being interviewed on the radio program Conversations with Allan Wolper on WBGO 88.3FM, Haygood revealed that he had tracked down another White House butler. At the last minute, this butler, who had served three presidents, refused to be interviewed; the man's family apparently did not want his story out against the parallel story of the election of President Barack Obama.

Haygood is a fellow of the John Simon Guggenheim Memorial Foundation and a professor at Miami University. Haygood's 2018 book Tigerland: 1968–1969: A City Divided, A Nation Torn Apart, And A Magical Season Of Healing was the runner-up for the 2019 Dayton Literary Peace Prize for Nonfiction. In 2022, Haygood was chosen as the recipient of the Dayton Literary Peace Prize's Ambassador Richard C. Holbrooke Distinguished Achievement Award.

== Books ==
- Two on the River, 1986
- King of Cats: The Life and Times of Adam Clayton Powell Jr., 1993
- The Haygoods of Columbus: A Family Memoir, 1997
- In Black and White: The Life of Sammy Davis Jr., 2003
- Sweet Thunder: The Life and Times of Sugar Ray Robinson, 2009
- The Butler: A Witness to History, 2013
- Showdown: Thurgood Marshall and the Supreme Court Nomination that Changed America, 2015 ISBN 9780307947376
- Tigerland: 1968–1969: A City Divided, A Nation Torn Apart, And A Magical Season Of Healing, 2018. ISBN 9780525432579
- Colorization: One Hundred Years of Black Films in a White World, 2021. ISBN 9780525656876
- The War Within a War: The Black Struggle in Vietnam and at Home, 2026. ISBN 9780593537695
