= Eugene Allen =

American waiter and butler (1919–2010)

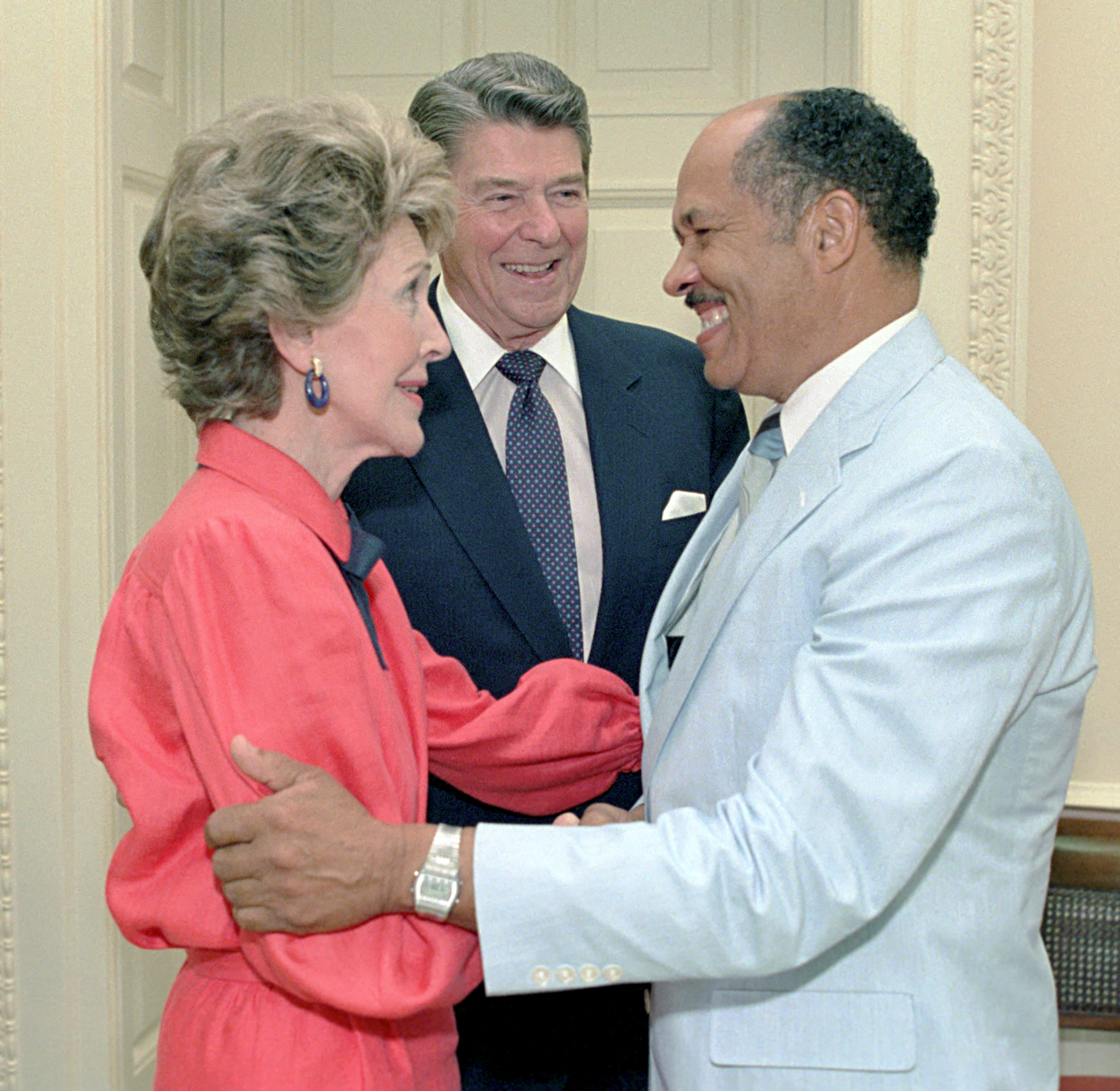
- Allen with Ronald and Nancy Reagan, 1986
- Born: July 14, 1919; Buckingham County, Virginia, U.S.
- Died: March 31, 2010 (aged 90); Takoma Park, Maryland, U.S.
- Occupation: Butler
- Spouse: Helene Lee (m. 1943; died 2008)

Eugene Charles Allen (July 14, 1919 – March 31, 2010) was an American waiter and butler who worked for the U.S. government at the White House for 34 years until he retired as the head butler in 1986.

Allen's life was the inspiration for the 2013 film The Butler.

== Life ==
Allen was born in Buckingham County, Virginia and raised on Shirland Farm, a sharecropping plantation near Scottsville. He worked as a waiter for many years, in "whites-only resorts and country clubs", including The Homestead resort in Hot Springs, Virginia, and a club in Washington.

He started in the White House in 1952 as a "pantry man", a job which involved basic tasks such as dish washing, stocking and polishing silverware. Over the years Allen rose in his position, becoming the butler to the president.

Allen was particularly affected by the assassination of President Kennedy in 1963. According to his son, "My father came home late on the day that President Kennedy had been shot. But then he got up and put his coat back on. He said, 'I've got to go back to work.' But in the hallway, he fell against the wall and started crying. That was the first time in my life I had ever seen my father cry." He was invited to the funeral, but chose to stay at work to prepare for the reception, because "Someone had to be at the White House to serve everyone after they came from the funeral." Allen never missed a day of work in 34 years.

Allen finally attained the most prestigious rank of butlers serving in the White House, Maître d'hôtel, in 1981, during the presidency of Ronald Reagan. Reagan invited Allen and his wife Helene to a state dinner in honor of Helmut Kohl at the White House. Allen was the first White House butler ever to be invited as a guest to a state dinner. He retired in 1986, after he worked for Harry S. Truman, Dwight D. Eisenhower, John F. Kennedy, Lyndon B. Johnson, Richard Nixon, Gerald Ford, Jimmy Carter, and Ronald Reagan, a total of eight presidents.

Allen was married to his wife, Helene, for 65 years. They met at a birthday party in Washington in 1942, and married a year later in 1943. The couple had one son, Charles Allen. He and his wife had intended to vote for Barack Obama in 2008, but she died the day before the election, on November 3.

Allen died of kidney failure at the Washington Adventist Hospital in Takoma Park, Maryland on March 31, 2010.

== Public reputation ==
Allen came to public attention when a 2008 article about him and his wife, by journalist Wil Haygood, entitled "A Butler Well Served by This Election", was published in The Washington Post shortly after the 2008 presidential election. It placed Allen's life in the context of changing race relations and the personalities of the presidents he'd served. It ended with the story of how the couple intended to vote for Obama together but Helene died just before the election,

They talked about praying to help Barack Obama get to the White House. They’d go vote together. She’d lean on her cane with one hand, and on him with the other, while walking down to the precinct. And she’d get supper going afterward...On Monday Helene had a doctor’s appointment. Gene woke and nudged her once, then again. He shuffled around to her side of the bed. He nudged Helene again. He was all alone. “I woke up and my wife didn’t,” he said later.

The story had an immediate impact. Columbia Pictures bought the film rights to Allen's life story, and he was invited to Obama's inauguration, where he commented, "That's the man...Whew, I'm telling you, it's something to see. Seeing him standing there, it's been worth it all."

Allen and other workers who served presidents were featured in a 32-minute documentary, Workers at the White House, directed by Marjorie Hunt and released on a 2009 DVD, White House Workers: Traditions and Memories by Smithsonian Folkways Recordings.

Allen's life was the inspiration for the 2013 film The Butler. Danny Strong's screenplay was inspired by the 2008 Washington Post article. The film departs from the facts of Allen's life. The central character, "Cecil Gaines", is only loosely based on the real Allen.
