= List of state dinners in the United States =

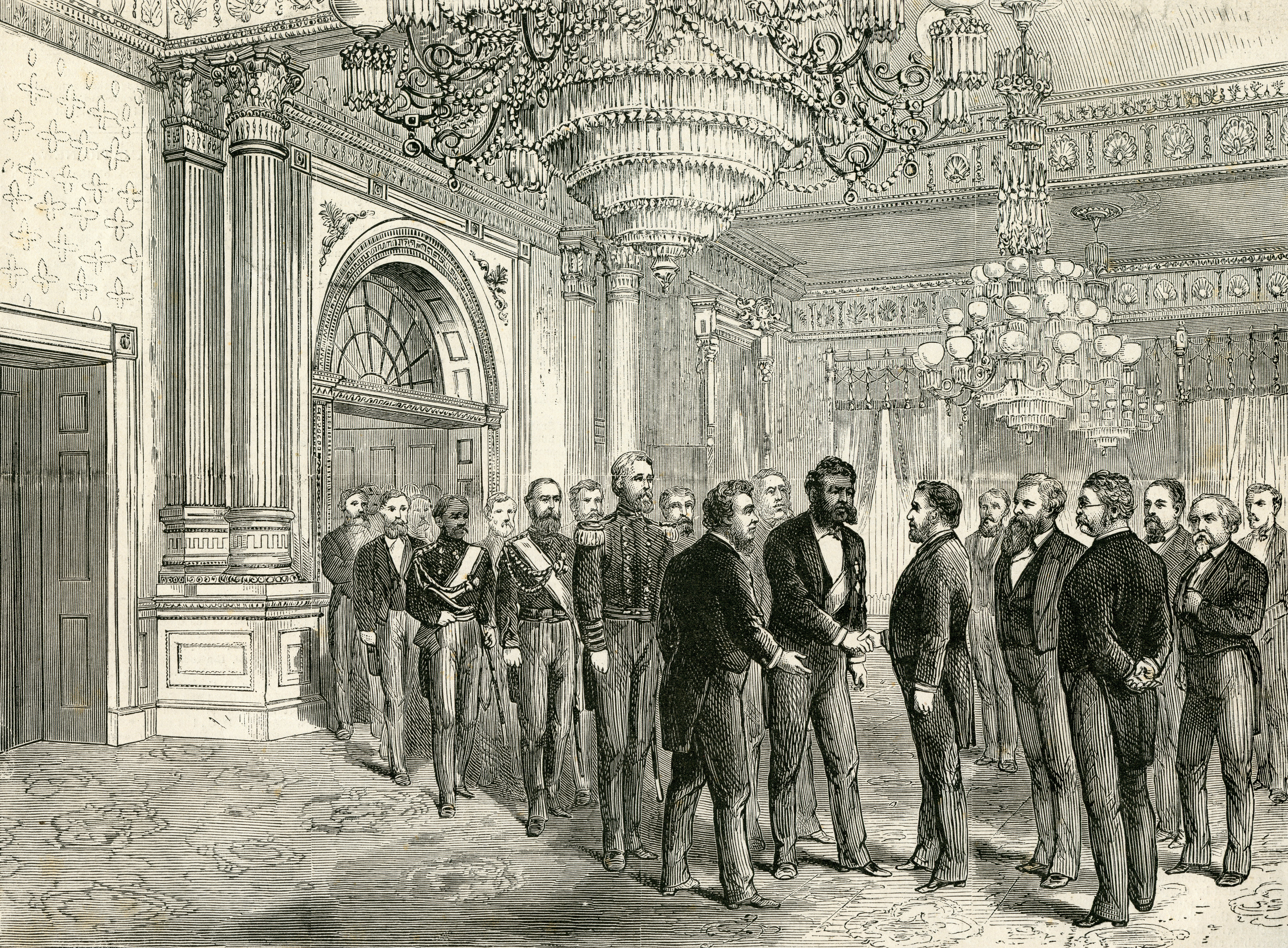
Illustration of the first state dinner at the White House. David Kalākaua, monarch of the Kingdom of Hawaii meeting with President Ulysses S. Grant.

A state dinner in the United States is a formal dinner held in honor of a foreign head of state, such as a king, queen, president, or any head of government. It is hosted by the President of the United States and is usually held in the State Dining Room at the White House in Washington, D.C. Other formal dinners for important people of other nations, such as a prince or princess, are called official dinners, the difference being that the federal government does not pay for them. Nowadays these dinners are more often black tie rather than white tie (see formal wear).

The first state dinner was held on December 22, 1874, by President Ulysses S. Grant to welcome King Kalākaua of the Kingdom of Hawai'i.

United States state dinners include a variety of dining events across the world, including conferences and summits. They influence many nations and their dining events. State dinners today have a lot more political significance than formerly, and are notably attended by prime ministers and presidents accompanied by politicians, entertainment and security services.

== Ulysses S. Grant ==
Date	Visiting Country	Guest(s) of Honor	Social Secretary
December 22, 1874	Hawaii	Kalākaua of Hawai'i	

== Herbert Hoover ==
Date	Visiting Country	Guest(s) of Honor	Social Secretary
April 29, 1931	Thailand	Prajadhipok of Thailand	Mary Randolph
October 22, 1931	France	Pierre Laval	

== Franklin D. Roosevelt ==
Date	Visiting Country	Guest(s) of Honor	Social Secretary
October 10, 1933	Panama	Harmodio Arias Madrid	Edith Benham Helm
June 8, 1939	United Kingdom	George VI of the United Kingdom	Edith Benham Helm
February 12, 1941	Luxembourg	Charlotte, Grand Duchess of Luxembourg	Edith Benham Helm
July 7, 1942	Colombia	Alfonso López Pumarejo	Edith Benham Helm
December 8, 1942	Cuba	Fulgencio Batista	Edith Benham Helm
June 9, 1943	Paraguay	Higinio Moríñigo	Edith Benham Helm
October 14, 1943	Haiti	Élie Lescot	Edith Benham Helm
January 19, 1944	Venezuela	Isaías Medina Angarita	Edith Benham Helm
June 7, 1944	Poland	Stanisław Mikołajczyk	Edith Benham Helm
August 24, 1944	Iceland	Sveinn Björnsson	Edith Benham Helm
March 23, 1945	Canada	Alexander Cambridge, 1st Earl of Athlone	Edith Benham Helm

== Harry S. Truman ==
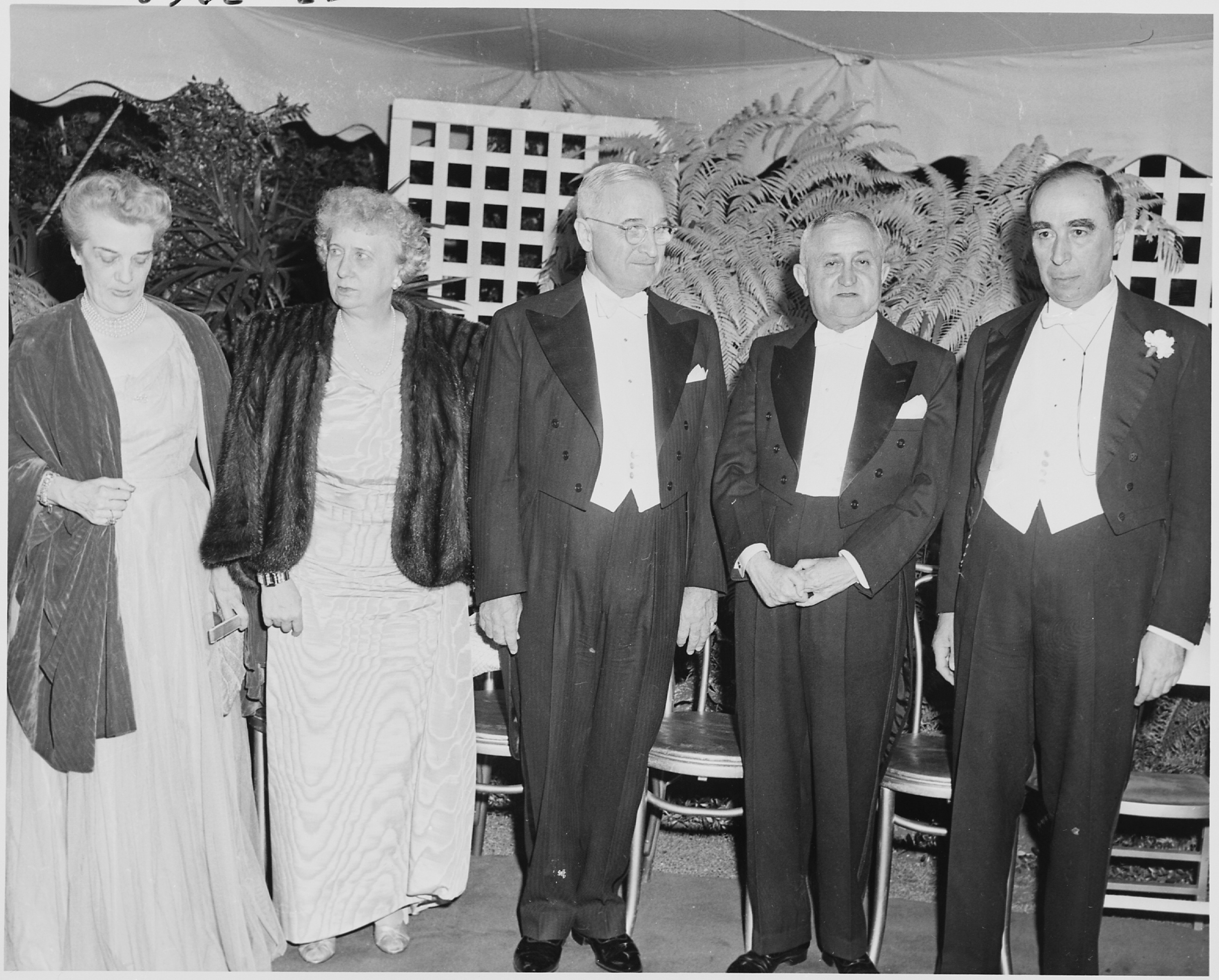
President Harry S. Truman and First Lady Bess Truman with Brazilian President Eurico Gaspar Dutra and other dignitaries at a state dinner (1949)

Date	Visiting Country	Guest(s) of Honor	Social Secretary
August 22, 1945	France	Charles de Gaulle	Edith Benham Helm
November 10, 1945	Canada; United Kingdom	William Lyon Mackenzie King; Clement Attlee	Edith Benham Helm
April 29, 1947	Mexico	Miguel Alemán Valdés	Edith Benham Helm
April 4, 1949	Belgium; Canada; Denmark; France; Iceland; Italy; Luxembourg; Netherlands; Portugal; United Kingdom	Paul-Henri Spaak, Robert Silvercruys; Lester B. Pearson, Humphrey Hume Wrong; Gustav Rasmussen, Henrik Kauffmann; Robert Schuman, Henri Bonnet; Bjarni Benediktsson, Thor Thors; Carlo Sforza, Alberto Tarchiani; Joseph Bech, Hugues Le Gallais; Dirk Stikker, Eelco van Kleffens; Jose Caeiro da Mata, Pedro Teotónio Pereira; Ernest Bevin, (Baron) Oliver Franks	Edith Benham Helm
May 18, 1949	Brazil	Eurico Gaspar Dutra	Edith Benham Helm
August 8, 1949	Philippines	Elpidio Quirino	Edith Benham Helm
November 16, 1949	Iran	Mohammad Reza Pahlavi	Edith Benham Helm
March 28, 1951	France	Vincent Auriol	Edith Benham Helm
June 20, 1951	Ecuador	Galo Plaza	Edith Benham Helm
April 2, 1952	Netherlands	Juliana of the Netherlands	Edith Benham Helm

== Dwight D. Eisenhower ==
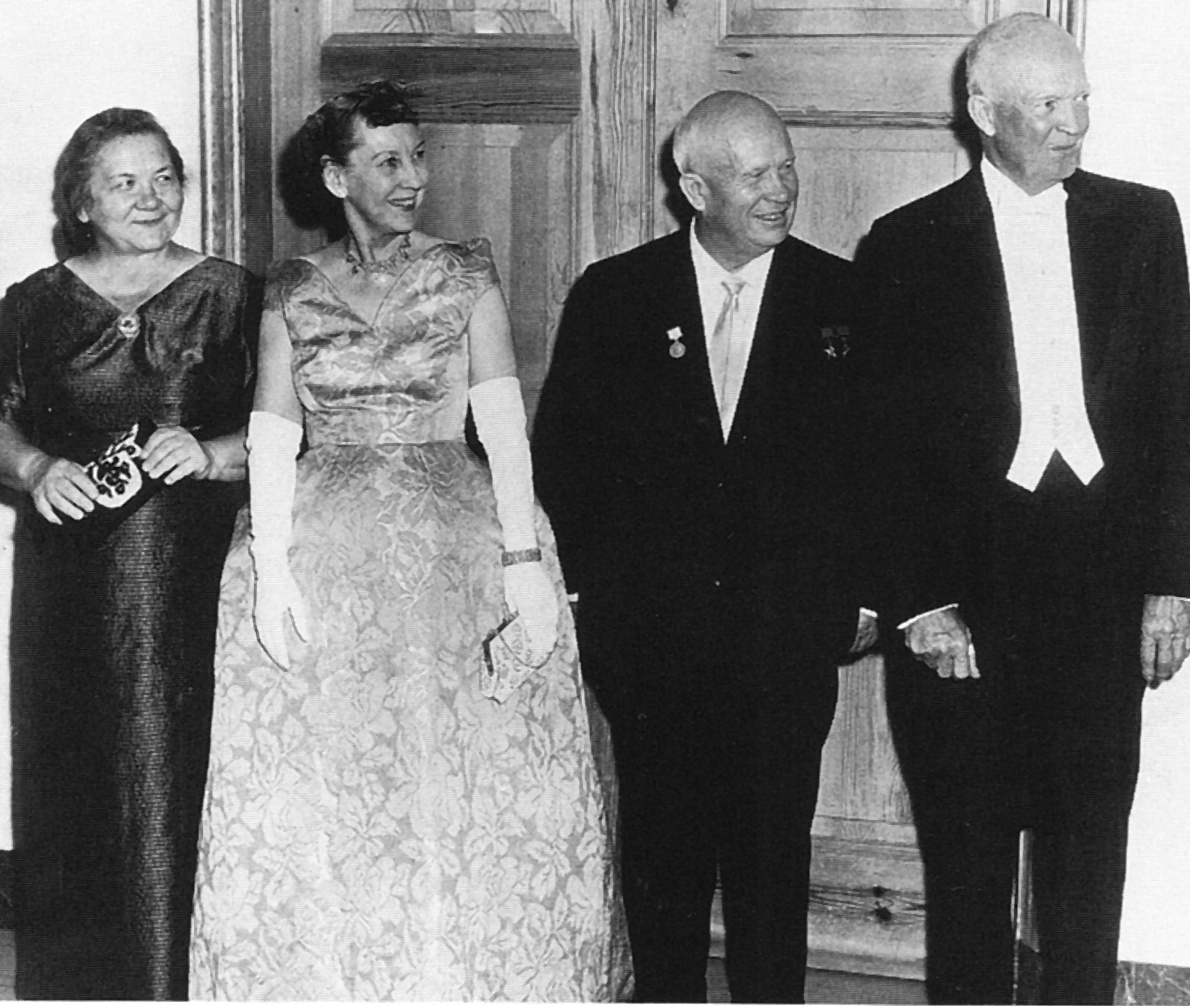
Dwight D. Eisenhower (far right), Nikita Khrushchev, and their wives at a state dinner (1959)

Date	Visiting Country	Guest(s) of Honor	Social Secretary
October 28, 1953	Greece	Paul of Greece	Mary Jane McCaffrey
January 27, 1954	Turkey	Celâl Bayar	Mary Jane McCaffrey
May 26, 1954	Ethiopia	Haile Selassie of Ethiopia	Mary Jane McCaffrey
July 26, 1954	South Korea	Syngman Rhee	Mary Jane McCaffrey
October 18, 1954	Liberia	William Tubman	Mary Jane McCaffrey
January 26, 1955	Haiti	Paul Magloire	Mary Jane McCaffrey
May 8, 1957	South Vietnam	Ngo Dinh Diem	Mary Jane McCaffrey
October 17, 1957	Canada	Elizabeth II of Canada	Mary Jane McCaffrey
June 4, 1958	West Germany	Theodor Heuss	Mary Jane McCaffrey
June 17, 1958	Philippines	Carlos P. Garcia	Mary Jane McCaffrey
January 20, 1959	Argentina	Arturo Frondizi	Mary Jane McCaffrey
March 10, 1959	El Salvador	José María Lemus	Mary Jane McCaffrey
March 17, 1959	Ireland	Seán T. O'Kelly	Mary Jane McCaffrey
May 11, 1959	Belgium	Baudouin of Belgium	Mary Jane McCaffrey
September 15, 1959	Soviet Union	Nikita Khrushchev	Mary Jane McCaffrey
October 9, 1959	Mexico	Adolfo López Mateos	Mary Jane McCaffrey
October 26, 1959	Guinea	Ahmed Sékou Touré	Mary Jane McCaffrey
April 5, 1960	Colombia	Alberto Lleras Camargo	Mary Jane McCaffrey
April 22, 1960	France	Charles de Gaulle	Mary Jane McCaffrey
April 27, 1960	Nepal	Mahendra of Nepal	Mary Jane McCaffrey
June 3, 1960	Canada	John Diefenbaker	Mary Jane McCaffrey
June 28, 1960	Thailand	Bhumibol Adulyadej of Thailand	Mary Jane McCaffrey
September 27, 1960	Japan	Prince Akihito	Mary Jane McCaffrey
October 11, 1960	Denmark	Frederik IX of Denmark	Mary Jane McCaffrey

== John F. Kennedy ==
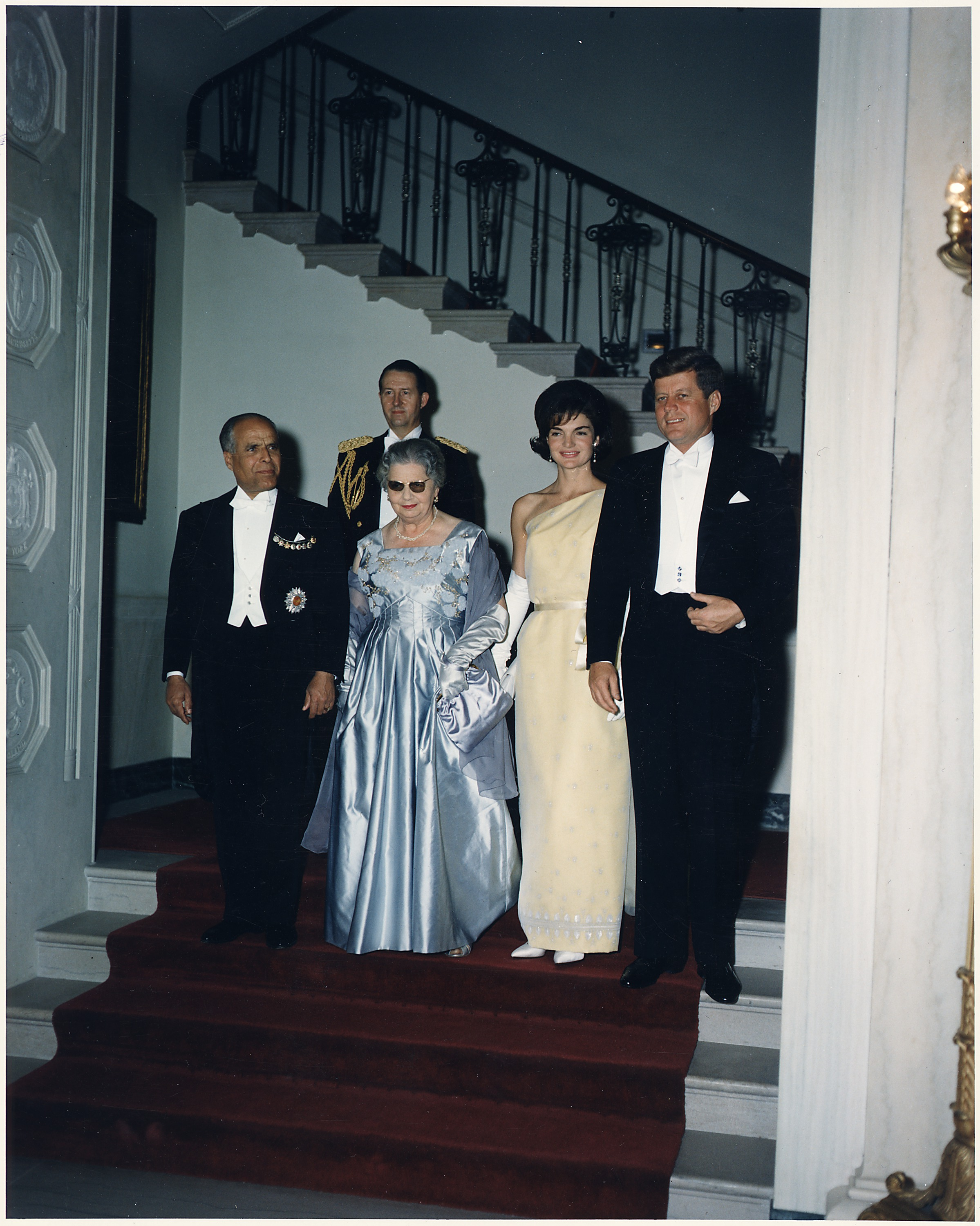
President Habib Bourguiba of Tunisia and President John F. Kennedy with their wives and General Chester Victor Clifton Jr. at the state dinner in 1961.

Date	Visiting Country	Guest(s) of Honor	Social Secretary	Entertainment
May 3, 1961	Tunisia	Habib Bourguiba	Letitia Baldrige	
July 11, 1961	Pakistan	Ayub Khan	Letitia Baldrige	National Symphony Orchestra
September 19, 1961	Peru	Manuel Prado Ugarteche	Letitia Baldrige	Roberta Peters, Jerome Hines
October 4, 1961	Sudan	Ibrahim Abboud	Letitia Baldrige	American Shakespeare Theatre
November 7, 1961	India	Jawaharlal Nehru	Letitia Baldrige	
February 13, 1962	Saudi Arabia	Saud of Saudi Arabia	Letitia Baldrige	
April 11, 1962	Iran	Mohammad Reza Pahlavi	Letitia Baldrige	Ballets: U.S.A., Jerome Robbins
May 22, 1962	Ivory Coast	Félix Houphouët-Boigny	Letitia Baldrige	American Ballet Theatre
February 19, 1963	Venezuela	Rómulo Betancourt	Letitia Baldrige	
March 27, 1963	Morocco	Hassan II of Morocco	Letitia Baldrige	New York City Center Light Opera Company
April 30, 1963	Luxembourg	Charlotte, Grand Duchess of Luxembourg	Letitia Baldrige	Basil Rathbone, Helen Boatwright, Consort Players
June 3, 1963	India	Sarvepalli Radhakrishnan	Letitia Baldrige	Washington National Opera
September 5, 1963	Afghanistan	Mohammed Zahir Shah	Letitia Baldrige	Military bands
October 1, 1963	Ethiopia	Haile Selassie of Ethiopia	Letitia Baldrige	Joffrey Ballet
October 15, 1963	Ireland	Seán Lemass	Letitia Baldrige	

== Lyndon B. Johnson ==
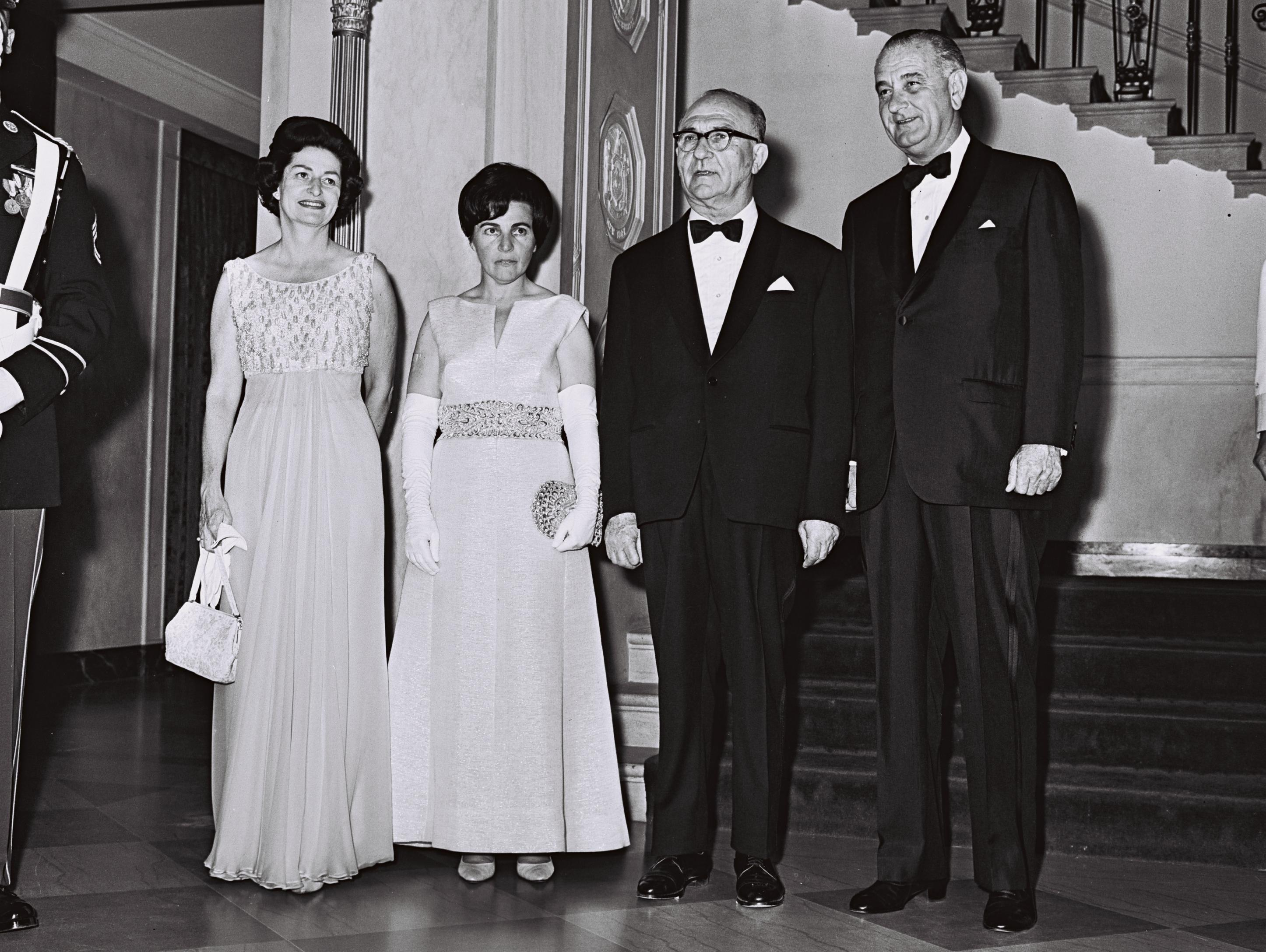
Lyndon B. Johnson, Levi Eshkol, and their wives enter a state dinner (1964)

Date	Visiting Country	Guest(s) of Honor	Location of Dinner	Social Secretary	Entertainment
December 29, 1963	West Germany	Ludwig Erhard	LBJ Ranch		Pianist Van Cliburn
January 14, 1964	Italy	Antonio Segni	White House	Bess Abell	Robert Merrill and The New Christy Minstrels
June 1, 1964	Israel	Levi Eshkol	White House	Bess Abell	
October 5, 1964	Philippines	Diosdado Macapagal	White House	Bess Abell	Harkness Ballet
March 29, 1965	Upper Volta	Maurice Yaméogo	White House	Bess Abell	Dancers from the American Institute of Indian Art
May 17, 1965	South Korea	Park Chung-hee	White House	Bess Abell	Walter Trampler
December 14, 1965	Pakistan	Ayub Khan	White House	Bess Abell	
June 21, 1966	Saudi Arabia	Faisal bin Abdulaziz Al Saud	White House	Bess Abell	Fireworks
September 8, 1966	Burma	Ne Win	White House	Bess Abell	
September 14, 1966	Philippines	Ferdinand Marcos	White House	Bess Abell	New York City Center Light Opera Company
September 28, 1966 (luncheon rather than dinner)	Senegal	Leopold Sedar Senghor	White House	Bess Abell	
February 14, 1967	Ethiopia	Haile Selassie	White House	Bess Abell	Singers Richard Tucker and Nedda Casei
April 3, 1967	Turkey	Cevdet Sunay	White House	Bess Abell	Opera Company of Boston
June 27, 1967	Thailand	Bhumibol Adulydej of Thailand	White House	Bess Abell	
October 26, 1967	Mexico	Gustavo Diaz-Ordaz	White House	Bess Abell	Herb Alpert and the Tijuana Brass
November 1, 1967	Nepal	King Mahendra	White House	Bess Abell	Charlie Byrd
March 20, 1968	Paraguay	General Alfredo Stroessner	White House	Bess Abell	
April 25, 1968	Norway	Olav V	White House	Bess Abell	Jeoffrey Ballet
May 15, 1968	Tunisia	Habib Bourguiba	White House	Bess Abell	Geoffrey Holder and Carmen de Lavallade
December 11, 1968	Kuwait	Sabah al-Salim al-Sabah	White House	Bess Abell	Robert Merrill and The New Christy Minstrels

== Richard Nixon ==
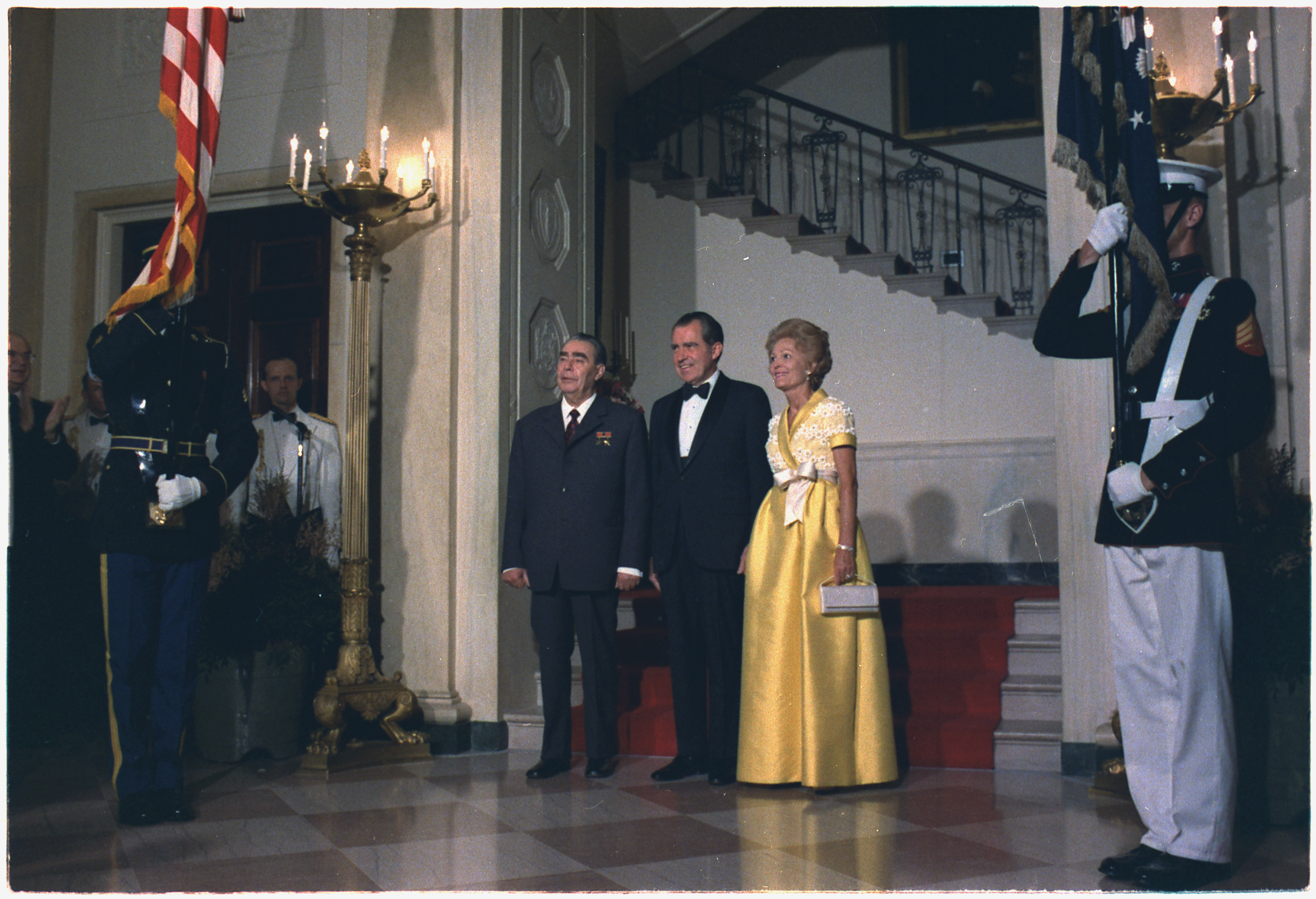
Richard Nixon, Pat Nixon, and Leonid Brezhnev at a state dinner (1973)

Date	Visiting Country	Guest(s) of Honor	Social Secretary
March 24, 1969	Canada	Pierre Trudeau	Lucy A. Winchester
April 8, 1969	Jordan	King Hussein	Lucy A. Winchester
May 6, 1969	Australia	John Gorton	Lucy A. Winchester
May 19, 1969	Sierra Leone	Siaka Stevens	Lucy A. Winchester
May 27, 1969	Netherlands	Petrus de Jong	Lucy A. Winchester
June 12, 1969	Colombia	Carlos Lleras Restrepo	Lucy A. Winchester
July 8, 1969	Ethiopia	Emperor Haile Selassie	Lucy A. Winchester
August 8, 1969	West Germany	Kurt-Georg Kiesinger	Lucy A. Winchester
September 16, 1969	New Zealand	Keith Holyoake	Lucy A. Winchester
September 25, 1969	Israel	Golda Meir	Lucy A. Winchester
October 7, 1969	Laos	Souvanna Phouma	Lucy A. Winchester
October 21, 1969	Iran	Mohammad Reza Pahlavi	Lucy A. Winchester
November 20, 1969	Japan	Eisaku Satō	Lucy A. Winchester
January 27, 1970	United Kingdom	Harold Wilson	Lucy A. Winchester
February 24, 1970	France	Georges Pompidou	Lucy A. Winchester
April 10, 1970	West Germany	Willy Brandt	Lucy A. Winchester
April 14, 1970	Denmark	Hilmar Baunsgaard	Lucy A. Winchester
May 27, 1970	Indonesia	Soeharto	Lucy A. Winchester
June 2, 1970	Venezuela	Rafael Caldera Rodriguez	Lucy A. Winchester
July 23, 1970	Finland	Urho Kekkonen	Lucy A. Winchester
August 4, 1970	DR Congo	Joseph-Désiré Mobutu	Lucy A. Winchester
December 17, 1970	United Kingdom	Edward Heath	Lucy A. Winchester
February 18, 1971	Italy	Emilio Colombo	Lucy A. Winchester
May 27, 1971	Saudi Arabia	Faisal of Saudi Arabia	Lucy A. Winchester
October 28, 1971	Yugoslavia	Josip Broz Tito	Lucy A. Winchester
November 4, 1971	India	Indira Gandhi	Lucy A. Winchester
December 7, 1971	Brazil	Emílio Médici	Lucy A. Winchester
March 21, 1972	Turkey	Nihat Erim	Lucy A. Winchester
June 15, 1972	Mexico	Luis Echeverria	Lucy A. Winchester
February 1, 1973	United Kingdom	Edward Heath	Lucy A. Winchester
April 10, 1973	Singapore	Lee Kuan Yew	Lucy A. Winchester
April 18, 1973	Italy	Giulio Andreotti	Lucy A. Winchester
May 2, 1973	West Germany	Willy Brandt	Lucy A. Winchester
May 15, 1973	Ethiopia	Haile Selassie	Lucy A. Winchester
June 18, 1973	Soviet Union	Leonid Brezhnev	Lucy A. Winchester
July 26, 1973	Iran	Mohammad Reza Pahlavi	Lucy A. Winchester
August 1, 1973	Japan	Kakuei Tanaka	Lucy A. Winchester
September 20, 1973	Pakistan	Zulfikar Ali Bhutto	Lucy A. Winchester
September 29, 1973	New Zealand	Norman Kirk	Lucy A. Winchester
October 11, 1973	Ivory Coast	Felix Houphouet-Boigny	Lucy A. Winchester
December 4, 1973	Romania	Nicolae Ceausescu	Lucy A. Winchester
March 12, 1974 (hosted by Vice President Gerald Ford in Nixon's place)	Jordan	Hussein of Jordan	Lucy A. Winchester

== Gerald Ford ==
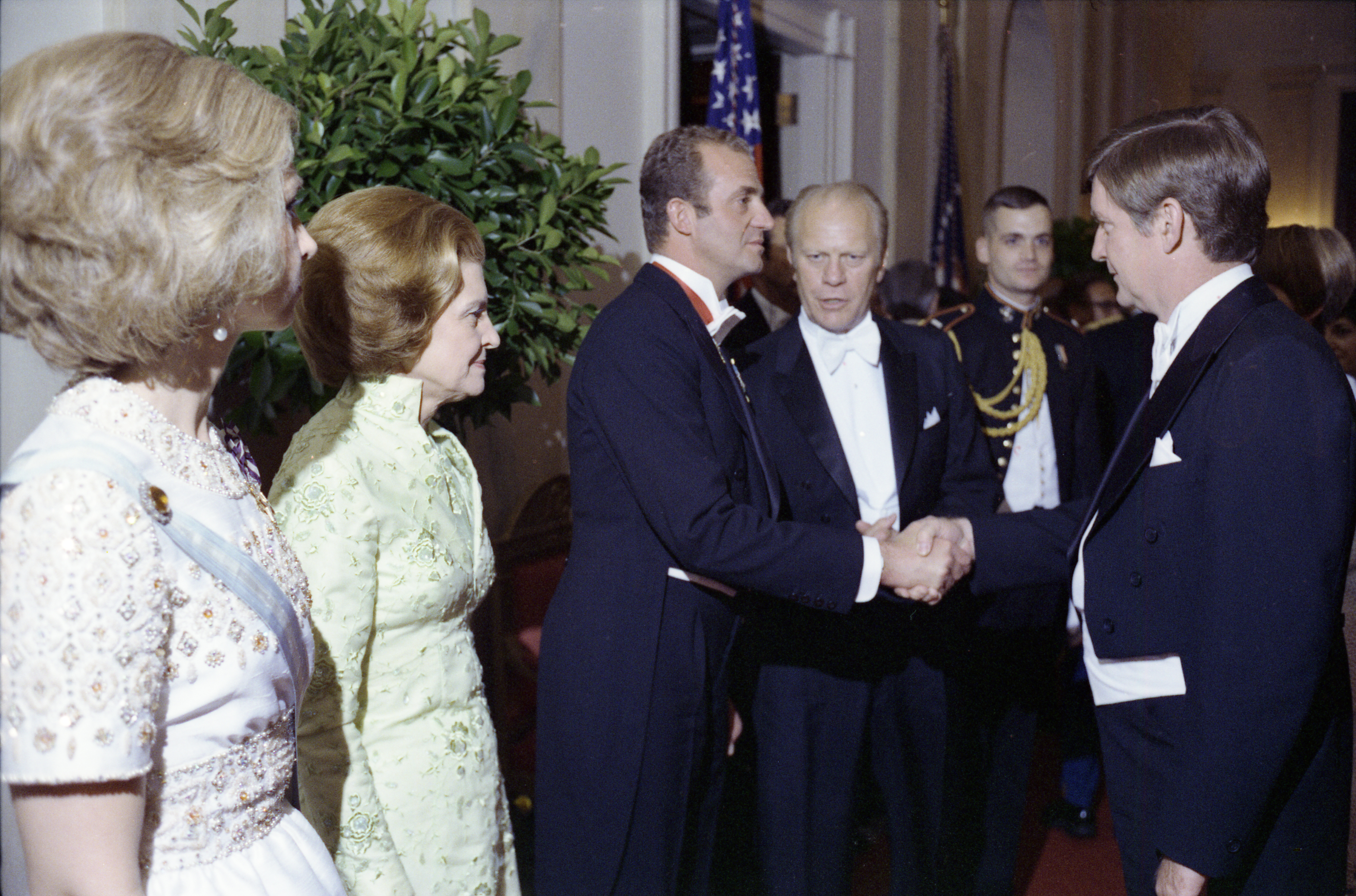
Queen Sofia, First Lady Betty Ford, King Juan Carlos I, and President Gerald Ford greeting guests at a state dinner (1976)

Date	Visiting Country	Guest(s) of Honor	Social Secretary
August 16, 1974	Jordan	Hussein of Jordan	Maria Downs
September 12, 1974	Israel	Yitzhak Rabin	Maria Downs
September 25, 1974	Italy	Giovanni Leone	Maria Downs
October 8, 1974	Poland	Edward Gierek	Maria Downs
November 12, 1974	Austria	Bruno Kreisky	Maria Downs
December 4, 1974	Canada	Pierre Trudeau	Maria Downs
December 5, 1974	West Germany	Helmut Schmidt	Maria Downs
February 5, 1975	Pakistan	Zulfikar Ali Bhutto	Maria Downs
January 30, 1975	United Kingdom	Harold Wilson	Maria Downs
April 19, 1975	Zambia	Kenneth Kaunda	Maria Downs
April 29, 1975	Jordan	King Hussein of Jordan	Maria Downs
May 1, 1975	Tunisia	Hedi Nouira	Maria Downs
May 8, 1975	Singapore	Lee Kuan Yew	Maria Downs
May 14, 1975	Netherlands	Joop den Uyl	Maria Downs
May 15, 1975	Iran	Mohammad Reza Pahlavi	Maria Downs
June 11, 1975	Israel	Yitzhak Rabin	Maria Downs
June 16, 1975	West Germany	Walter Scheel	Maria Downs
August 5, 1975	Japan	Takeo Miki	Maria Downs
September 25, 1975	Colombia	Alfonso Lopez Michelsen	Maria Downs
October 2, 1975	Japan	Emperor Hirohito	Maria Downs
October 27, 1975	Egypt	Anwar Sadat	Maria Downs
November 12, 1975	Luxembourg	Gaston Thorn	Maria Downs
January 27, 1976	Israel	Yitzhak Rabin	Maria Downs
March 17, 1976	Ireland	Liam Cosgrave	Maria Downs
March 30, 1976	Jordan	King Hussein of Jordan	Maria Downs
May 17, 1976	France	Valery Giscard d'Estaing	Maria Downs
June 2, 1976	Spain	King Juan Carlos	Maria Downs
July 7, 1976	United Kingdom	Queen Elizabeth II	Maria Downs
July 15, 1976	West Germany	Helmut Schmidt	Maria Downs
July 27, 1976	Australia	Malcolm Fraser	Maria Downs
August 3, 1976	Finland	Urho Kekkonen	Maria Downs
September 21, 1976	Liberia	William Tolbert	Maria Downs
December 6, 1976	Italy	Giulio Andreotti	Maria Downs

== Jimmy Carter ==
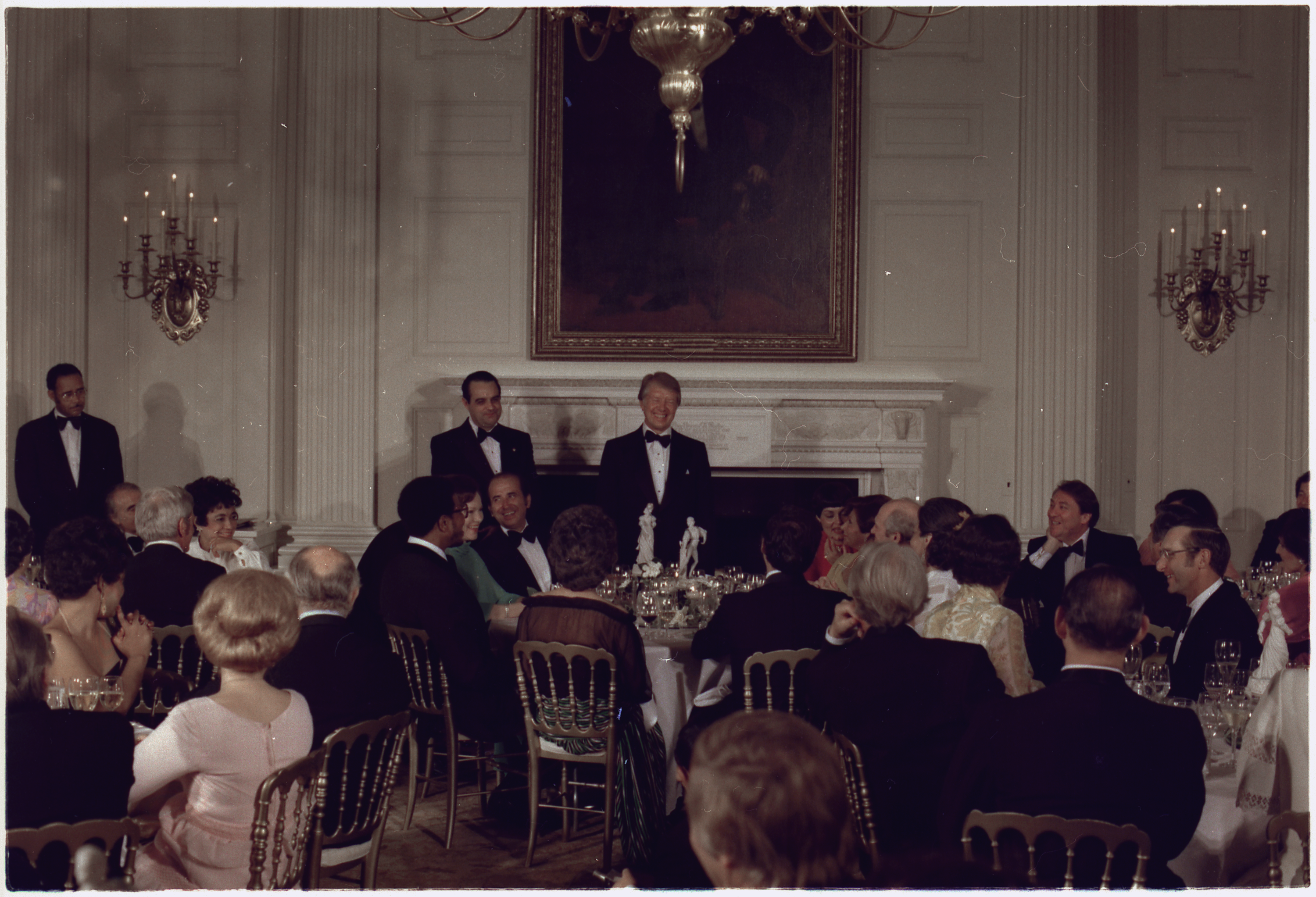
Jimmy Carter toasts Carlos Andres Perez, the President of Venezuela, during a state dinner (1977)

Date	Visiting Country	Guest(s) of Honor	Social Secretary	Entertainment
February 14, 1977	Mexico	José López Portillo	Gretchen Poston	Rudolf Serkin
February 21, 1977	Canada	Pierre Trudeau	Gretchen Poston	The Young Columbians
March 7, 1977	Israel	Yitzhak Rabin	Gretchen Poston	The Alexandria Quartet
March 10, 1977	United Kingdom	James Callaghan	Gretchen Poston	Robert White
March 21, 1977	Japan	Takeo Fukuda	Gretchen Poston	The Tokyo String Quartet
April 4, 1977	Egypt	Anwar Al-Sadat	Gretchen Poston	
April 25, 1977	Jordan	King Hussein of Jordan	Gretchen Poston	Wind Quartet from the Richmond Symphony
May 24, 1977	Saudi Arabia	Fahd of Saudi Arabia	Gretchen Poston	
June 22, 1977	Australia	Malcolm Fraser	Gretchen Poston	
June 28, 1977	Venezuela	Carlos Andrés Pérez	Gretchen Poston	Cynthia Gregory and Ted Kivitt
July 13, 1977	West Germany	Helmut Schmidt	Gretchen Poston	Members of the Metropolitan Opera Company
July 19, 1977	Israel	Menachem Begin	Gretchen Poston	
July 26, 1977	Italy	Giulio Andreotti	Gretchen Poston	Shirley Verrett
August 4, 1977	Tanzania	Mwalimu Julius K. Neyere	Gretchen Poston	The Richard Quintet
September 7, 1977 (Dinner held in connection with the signing of the Torrijos–Carter Treaties regarding the transfer of the Panama Canal)	Paraguay Dominican Republic Bolivia Chile Costa Rica Venezuela Guatemala Colombia Honduras Peru Ecuador Argentina Uruguay El Salvador Canada Panama Jamaica Bahamas Grenada Brazil Guyana Haiti Nicaragua Mexico Trinidad and Tobago Suriname Barbados	Alfredo Stroessner Joaquin Balaguer Hugo Banzer Suarez Augusto Pinochet Ugarte Daniel Oduber Quiros Carlos Andres Perez Kjell Eugenio Laugerud Garcia Alfonso Lopez Michelsen Juan Alberto Melgar Castro Francisco Morales Bermudez Alfredo Poveda Burbano Jorge Rafael Videla Aparicio Mendez Carlos Humberto Romero Pierre Elliott Trudeau Omar Torrijos Herrera Michael Norman Manley Lynden O. Pindling Eric Gairy Adalberto Pereira dos Santos Ptolemy A. Reid Edner Brutus Cornelio Hueck Santiago Garcia Victor C. McIntyre Roel F. Karamat Oliver H. Jackman	Gretchen Poston	Martina Arroyo, Isaac Stern and Andre Previn
September 9, 1977	France	Raymond Barre	Gretchen Poston	Elizabeth Matesky
October 11, 1977	Nigeria	Olusegun Obasanjo	Gretchen Poston	Susan Starr
October 19, 1977	Belgium	Leo Tindemans	Gretchen Poston	
November 15, 1977	Iran	Mohammad Reza Pahlavi	Gretchen Poston	
March 7, 1978	Yugoslavia	Josip Broz Tito	Gretchen Poston	
April 12, 1978	Romania	Nicolae Ceaușescu	Gretchen Poston	George Shearing, Clamma Dale
May 3, 1978	Japan	Takeo Fukuda	Gretchen Poston	
May 17, 1978	Zambia	Kenneth Kaunda	Gretchen Poston	Mel Downs
June 13, 1978	India	Morarji Desai	Gretchen Poston	James Weaver
November 14, 1978	Morocco	Hassan II of Morocco	Gretchen Poston	Alvin Ailey
January 29, 1979	China	Deng Xiaoping	Gretchen Poston	
February 6, 1979	Thailand	Kriangsak Chomanan	Gretchen Poston	The American Dance Machine
March 26, 1979	Egypt; Israel	Anwar Al-Sadat; Menachem Begin	Gretchen Poston	Omar Khorshid and Gamal Abdel-Rahim; Itzhak Perlman and Pinchas Zukerman; Leontyne Price
May 2, 1979	Japan	Masayoshi Ōhira	Gretchen Poston	Bobby Short
September 28, 1979	Mexico	José López Portillo	Gretchen Poston	Chamber Music Society of Lincoln Center
November 8, 1979	Ireland	Jack Lynch	Gretchen Poston	Washington Opera
December 17, 1979	United Kingdom	Margaret Thatcher	Gretchen Poston	
January 24, 1980	Italy	Francesco Cossiga	Gretchen Poston	Tom T. Hall
February 20, 1980	Kenya	Daniel arap Moi	Gretchen Poston	Delphin & Romain
March 5, 1980	West Germany	Helmut Schmidt	Gretchen Poston	The New York Jazz Repertory Company
April 8, 1980	Egypt	Anwar Al-Sadat	Gretchen Poston	The Statler Brothers
April 15, 1980	Israel	Menachem Begin	Gretchen Poston	The Guarneri String Quartet
April 22, 1980	Belgium	Baudouin of Belgium	Gretchen Poston	New York Harp Ensemble
June 17, 1980	Jordan	King Hussein of Jordan	Gretchen Poston	Andre Watts
October 7, 1980	Nigeria	Shehu Shagari	Gretchen Poston	Cicely Tyson

== Ronald Reagan ==
Date	Visiting Country	Guest(s) of Honor	Social Secretary	Entertainment	Image
February 26, 1981	United Kingdom	Margaret Thatcher	Mabel Brandon	Dance Theatre of Harlem	
May 7, 1981	Japan	Zenkō Suzuki		Shirley Verrett	
May 21, 1981	West Germany	Helmut Schmidt		Juilliard String Quartet	
June 30, 1981	Australia	Malcolm Fraser		Vincent Dowling	
August 5, 1981	Egypt	Anwar Sadat		Gold and Fizdale	
September 9, 1981	Israel	Menachem Begin		Andre-Michel Schub	
October 13, 1981	Spain	King Juan Carlos I		Ella Fitzgerald	
November 2, 1981	Jordan	King Hussein I		Benny Goodman and Buddy Rich	
November 17, 1981	Venezuela	Luis Herrera Campins		Robert Goulet	
February 3, 1982	Egypt	Hosni Mubarak		Itzhak Perlman and Samuel Sanders	
March 25, 1982	Italy	Sandro Pertini		Perry Como and Frank Sinatra	
April 19, 1982	Netherlands	Queen Beatrix		George Shearing and Brian Torff	
May 12, 1982	Brazil	João Figueiredo		Sérgio Mendes	
July 29, 1982	India	Indira Gandhi		New York Philharmonic	
September 16, 1982	Philippines	Ferdinand Marcos		The 5th Dimension	
October 12, 1982	Indonesia	Suharto		Frederica von Stade and Martin Katz	
November 15, 1982	West Germany	Helmut Kohl		Peter Nero and Richard Nanista	
December 7, 1982	Pakistan	Muhammad Zia-ul-Haq		Pinchas Zukerman, Eugenia Zukerman, and Marc Neikrug	
April 12, 1983	Oman	Sultan Qaboos bin Said al Said		Anna Moffo and Robert Merrill	
June 7, 1983	Ivory Coast	Félix Houphouët-Boigny		Chamber Music Society of Lincoln Center	
July 19, 1983	Bahrain	Isa bin Salman Al Khalifa		Byron Janis	
September 15, 1983	Portugal	António Ramalho Eanes		Sergio Franchi	
October 4, 1983	West Germany	Karl Carstens		Sherrill Milnes	
December 7, 1983	Nepal	King Birendra Bir Bikram Shah		Ferrante & Teicher	
January 10, 1984	China	Zhao Ziyang		Isaac Stern and Andrew Wolf	
February 28, 1984	Austria	Rudolf Kirchschläger		Peter Nero and Mel Torme	
March 22, 1984	France	François Mitterrand		Julio Iglesias	
April 10, 1984	Dominican Republic	Salvador Jorge Blanco		Wayne Newton	
May 15, 1984	Mexico	Miguel de la Madrid		Gloria Loring	
June 18, 1984	Sri Lanka	J.R. Jayewardene		Frank Sinatra	
November 13, 1984	Luxembourg	Jean, Grand Duke of Luxembourg		Twyla Tharp Dance Company	
December 4, 1984	Venezuela	Jaime Lusinchi		Andy Williams	
February 11, 1985	Saudi Arabia	Fahd of Saudi Arabia		Montserrat Caballé	
March 19, 1985	Argentina	Raúl Alfonsín		Pete Fountain	
April 17, 1985	Algeria	Chadli Bendjedid		Fernando Bujones and Marianna Tcherkassky	
June 12, 1985	India	Rajiv Gandhi		Mstislav Rostropovich and Lambert Orkis	
July 23, 1985	China	Li Xiannian		Grace Bumbry and Gregg Baker	
September 10, 1985	Denmark	Poul Schlüter		Vic Damone	
October 8, 1985	Singapore	Lee Kuan Yew		Karen Akers and Mark Hummel	
January 14, 1986	Ecuador	León Febres Cordero		Jessye Norman and Phillip Moll	
March 18, 1986	Canada	Brian Mulroney		Rosalyn Tureck	
June 17, 1986	Uruguay	Julio María Sanguinetti		Dave Brubeck Quartet	
July 16, 1986	Pakistan	Muhammad Khan Junejo		Eugene Fodor and Judith Olson	
September 10, 1986	Brazil	José Sarney	Linda Faulkner	Paul Anka	
October 21, 1986	West Germany	Helmut Kohl	Linda Faulkner	Joel Grey	
March 31, 1987	France	Jacques Chirac	Linda Faulkner	Dionne Warwick	
April 30, 1987	Japan	Yasuhiro Nakasone		Henry Mancini	
September 9, 1987	Sweden	Ingvar Carlsson		Marilyn Horne and Martin Katz	
October 14, 1987	El Salvador	José Napoleón Duarte		Lionel Hampton	
November 10, 1987	Israel	Chaim Herzog		Roberta Peters and Yakov Kreizberg	
December 8, 1987	Soviet Union	Mikhail Gorbachev		Van Cliburn	
January 28, 1988	Egypt	Hosni Mubarak		Patti Austin and David Benoit	
April 11, 1988	Sweden	Carl XVI Gustaf		Barbara Cook, Wally Harper, and Robert Dodelin	
April 27, 1988	Canada	Brian Mulroney		Bruce Hubbard and Larry Woodard	
June 27, 1988	Turkey	Kenan Evren		Christopher Parkening	
October 6, 1988	Mali	Moussa Traoré		Pete Fountain	
November 16, 1988	United Kingdom	Margaret Thatcher		Michael Feinstein	

== George H. W. Bush ==
Date	Visiting Country	Guest(s) of Honor	Social Secretary	Entertainment	Image
April 4, 1989	Egypt	Hosni Mubarak	Laurie Firestone		
April 6, 1989	Israel	Yitzak Shamir	Laurie Firestone	Michael Carney Orchestra	
April 19, 1989	Jordan	King Hussein I	Laurie Firestone	Mstislav Rostropovich and Lambert Orkis	
June 6, 1989	Pakistan	Benazir Bhutto	Laurie Firestone	Itzhak Perlman	
June 27, 1989	Australia	Robert Hawke	Laurie Firestone	Leontyne Price	
October 3, 1989	Mexico	Carlos Salinas de Gortari	Laurie Firestone	Judy Kaye	
October 11, 1989	Italy	Francesco Cossiga	Laurie Firestone	Isaac Stern	
January 24, 1990	Yemen	Ali Abdullah Saleh	Laurie Firestone	Alessandra Marc	
March 6, 1990	Italy	Giulio Andreotti	Laurie Firestone	Roberta Peters	
March 21, 1990	Poland	Tadeusz Mazowiecki	Laurie Firestone	Garrick Ohlsson	
May 5, 1990	Tunisia	Zine El Abidine Ben Ali	Laurie Firestone	Harry Connick Jr.	
May 30, 1990	Soviet Union	Mikhail Gorbachev	Laurie Firestone	Frederica von Stade	
October 18, 1990	Hungary	József Antall	Laurie Firestone	Van Cliburn	
February 20, 1991	Denmark	Queen Margrethe II	Laurie Firestone	Frederica von Stade	
March 20, 1991	Poland	Lech Wałęsa	Laurie Firestone	Karen Akers	
April 17, 1991	Nicaragua	Violeta Chamorro	Laurie Firestone	Johnny Mathis	
May 14, 1991	United Kingdom	Queen Elizabeth II; Prince Philip, Duke of Edinburgh	Laurie Firestone		
June 18, 1991	Brazil	Fernando Collor de Mello	Laurie Firestone	Gloria Estefan	
July 2, 1991	South Korea	Roh Tae Woo	Laurie Firestone	Broadway production The Phantom of the Opera	
September 10, 1991	Senegal	Abdou Diouf	Laurie Firestone	Boys Choir of Harlem	
September 26, 1991	Morocco	King Hassan II	Laurie Firestone	Roberta Peters	
February 26, 1992	Bolivia; Colombia; Ecuador; Mexico; Peru; Venezuela	Jaime Paz Zamora; César Gaviria; Rodrigo Borja Cevallos; Carlos Salinas de Gortari; Alberto Fujimori; Armando Durán	Laurie Firestone		
April 29, 1992	Germany	Richard von Weizsäcker	Laurie Firestone		
May 13, 1992	Chile	Patricio Aylwin	Laurie Firestone	Yo-Yo Ma	
June 16, 1992	Russia	Boris Yeltsin	Laurie Firestone	Carol Vaness	

== Bill Clinton ==
Date	Visiting Country	Guest(s) of Honor	Social Secretary	Entertainment	Image
November 23, 1993	South Korea	Kim Young-sam	Ann Stock	Jessye Norman	
June 13, 1994	Japan	Emperor Akihito; Empress Michiko	Ann Stock	Mstislav Rostropovich	
July 25, 1994	Israel; Jordan	Yitzhak Rabin; King Hussein I	Ann Stock	United States Marine Band	
September 27, 1994	Russia	Boris Yeltsin	Ann Stock	Kathleen Battle	
October 4, 1994	South Africa	Nelson Mandela	Ann Stock	Whitney Houston	
February 9, 1995	Germany	Helmut Kohl	Ann Stock	Tony Bennett	
March 15, 1995	Morocco	King Hassan II		Modern Jazz Quartet	
April 20, 1995	Brazil	Fernando Cardoso		Ramsey Lewis and Billy Taylor	
July 27, 1995	South Korea	Kim Young-sam		Liza Minnelli	
October 10, 1995	Mexico	Ernesto Zedillo		Limon Dance Company	
February 1, 1996	France	Jacques Chirac		Thomas Hampson	
June 13, 1996	Ireland	Mary Robinson		Mary Chapin Carpenter and Mary Black	
February 26, 1997	Chile	Eduardo Frei		Yo-Yo Ma, Edgar Meyer, and Mark O'Connor	
April 8, 1997	Canada	Jean Chrétien		Warren Jones and Denyce Graves	
October 29, 1997	China	Jiang Zemin	Capricia Marshall	National Symphony Orchestra	
February 5, 1998	United Kingdom	Tony Blair	Capricia Marshall	Elton John and Stevie Wonder	
May 6, 1998	Italy	Romano Prodi	Capricia Marshall	David Miller and Marcus Haddock	
June 9, 1998	South Korea	Kim Dae-jung	Capricia Marshall	Hong Hei-kyung	
September 16, 1998	Czech Republic	Václav Havel	Capricia Marshall	Lou Reed	
October 28, 1998	Colombia	Andrés Pastrana Arango	Capricia Marshall	Ainhoa Arteta	
January 11, 1999	Argentina	Carlos Menem	Capricia Marshall	Robert Duvall and Luciana Pedraza	
February 24, 1999	Ghana	Jerry Rawlings	Capricia Marshall	Najee	
April 8, 1999	China	Zhu Rongji	Capricia Marshall	Yo-Yo Ma	
May 3, 1999	Japan	Keizo Obuchi	Capricia Marshall	Van Cliburn	
June 8, 1999	Hungary	Árpád Göncz	Capricia Marshall	Judy Collins and Cory Pesaturo	
February 23, 2000	Spain	King Juan Carlos I	Capricia Marshall	Placido Domingo	
May 22, 2000	South Africa	Thabo Mbeki	Capricia Marshall	Awadagin Pratt	
June 20, 2000	Morocco	King Mohammed VI	Capricia Marshall	Earth, Wind, & Fire	
September 17, 2000	India	Atal Bihari Vajpayee	Capricia Marshall	Chamber Music Society of Lincoln Center	

== George W. Bush ==
Date	Visiting Country	Guest(s) of Honor	Social Secretary	Entertainment	Image
September 5, 2001	Mexico	Vicente Fox	Catherine Fenton	Dawn Upshaw	
July 17, 2002	Poland	Aleksander Kwaśniewski	Catherine Fenton	Vanessa Rubin	
May 19, 2003	Philippines	Gloria Macapagal Arroyo	Catherine Fenton	Susan Graham	
October 6, 2003	Kenya	Mwai Kibaki	Catherine Fenton	Alvin Ailey American Dance Theater	
July 18, 2005	India	Manmohan Singh		Preservation Hall Jazz Band	
November 2, 2005	United Kingdom	Charles, Prince of Wales; Camilla, Duchess of Cornwall		Yo-Yo Ma	
May 16, 2006	Australia	John Howard	Lea Berman	Kenny Chesney	
June 29, 2006	Japan	Junichiro Koizumi	Lea Berman	The Brian Setzer Orchestra	
May 7, 2007	United Kingdom	Queen Elizabeth II; Prince Philip, Duke of Edinburgh	Amy Zantzinger	Itzhak Perlman	
November 6, 2007	France	Nicolas Sarkozy	Amy Zantzinger	Reenactment of the Visit of the Marquis de Lafayette to the United States	
September 15, 2008	Ghana	John Kufuor	Amy Zantzinger	Broadway production The Lion King	
September 20, 2008	Colombia	Alvaro Uribe Velez	Amy Zantzinger		
October 13, 2008	Italy	Silvio Berlusconi	Amy Zantzinger	Broadway production Jersey Boys	

== Barack Obama ==
Date	Visiting Country	Guest(s) of Honor	Social Secretary	Entertainment	Image
November 24, 2009	India	Manmohan Singh	Desiree Rogers	National Symphony Orchestra, Jennifer Hudson, Kurt Elling, and A. R. Rahman	
May 19, 2010	Mexico	Felipe Calderon	Julianna Smoot	Beyoncé and Rodrigo y Gabriela	
January 19, 2011	China	Hu Jintao	Julianna Smoot	Chris Botti, Dee Dee Bridgewater, Herbie Hancock, Lang Lang, Dianne Reeves, Thelonious Monk Institute of Jazz	
June 7, 2011	Germany	Angela Merkel	Jeremy Bernard	James Taylor	
October 13, 2011	South Korea	Lee Myung-bak	Jeremy Bernard	Ahn Trio and Janelle Monae	
March 14, 2012	United Kingdom	David Cameron	Jeremy Bernard	Mumford and Sons, John Legend	
February 11, 2014	France	François Hollande	Jeremy Bernard	Mary J. Blige	
April 28, 2015	Japan	Shinzō Abe	Jeremy Bernard	Cast of the film Jersey Boys	
September 25, 2015	China	Xi Jinping	Deesha Dyer	Ne-Yo	
March 10, 2016	Canada	Justin Trudeau	Deesha Dyer	Sara Bareilles	
May 13, 2016	Denmark; Finland; Iceland; Norway; Sweden	Lars Løkke Rasmussen; Sauli Niinistö; Sigurður Ingi Jóhannsson; Erna Solberg; Stefan Löfven	Deesha Dyer	Demi Lovato	
August 2, 2016	Singapore	Lee Hsien Loong	Deesha Dyer	Chrisette Michele	
October 18, 2016	Italy	Matteo Renzi	Deesha Dyer	Gwen Stefani	

== Donald Trump (first presidency) ==
Date	Visiting Country	Guest(s) of Honor	Social Secretary	Entertainment	Image
April 24, 2018	France	Emmanuel Macron	Rickie Niceta	Washington National Opera	
September 20, 2019	Australia	Scott Morrison	Rickie Niceta	U.S. Army, Navy, Air Force and Marines Bands	

== Joe Biden ==
Date	Visiting Country	Guest(s) of Honor	Social Secretary	Entertainment	Image
December 1, 2022	France	Emmanuel Macron	Carlos Elizondo	Jon Batiste	
April 26, 2023	South Korea	Yoon Suk Yeol	Carlos Elizondo	Norm Lewis, Jessica Vosk, Lea Salonga, Yoon Suk Yeol (Note: During the dinner, Biden remarked that he knew one of South Korean President Yoon Suk Yeol's favorite songs was Don McLean's "American Pie"; at Biden's insistence, Yoon then sang the ballad in front of rapturous applause. Yoon was then presented a guitar signed by the singer Don McLean.)	
June 22, 2023	India	Narendra Modi	Carlos Elizondo	Joshua Bell	
October 25, 2023	Australia	Anthony Albanese	Carlos Elizondo	U.S. Marine Band	
April 10, 2024	Japan	Fumio Kishida	Carlos Elizondo	Paul Simon	
May 23, 2024	Kenya	William Ruto	Carlos Elizondo	Brad Paisley, Gospel Choir of Howard University	

== Donald Trump (second presidency) ==
Date	Visiting Country	Guest(s) of Honor	Social Secretary	Entertainment	Image
April 28, 2026	United Kingdom	King Charles III; Queen Camilla	Vacant	U.S. Army, Navy, Air Force and Marines Bands	
September 24, 2026	China	Xi Jinping	Vacant	Christopher Macchio, U.S. Army, Navy, Air Force and Marines	

== See also ==
- List of dining events
