= Tyler Abell =

American lawyer (1932–2026)

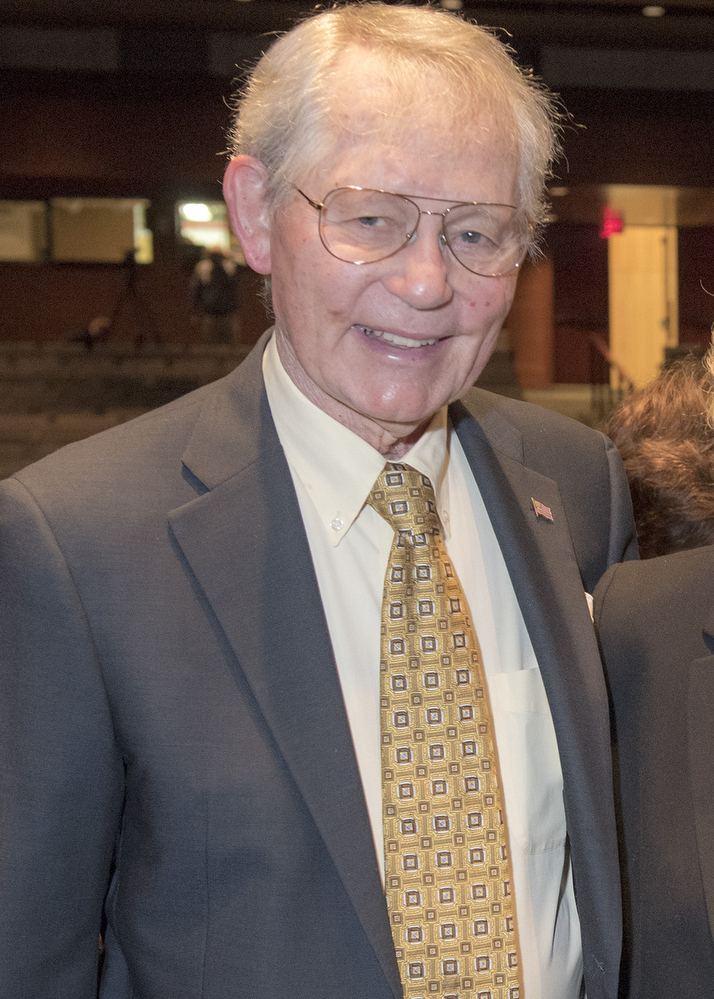
- Abell in 2017

14th Chief of Protocol of the United States
- In office September 30, 1968 – January 20, 1969
- President: Lyndon B. Johnson
- Preceded by: Angier Biddle Duke
- Succeeded by: Emil Mosbacher

Personal details
- Born: August 9, 1932 Washington, D.C., U.S.
- Died: September 19, 2026 (aged 94)
- Spouse: Bess Abell (m. 1955; died 2020)
- Relations: Luvie Moore Abell (mother); George Abell (father); Drew Pearson (stepfather)

Tyler Abell (August 9, 1932 – September 19, 2026) was an American lawyer who briefly served as Chief of Protocol of the United States in the late 1960s.

== Background ==
Tyler Abell was born in Washington, D.C., on August 9, 1932, the child of Luvie Moore Abell and writer George Abell. When Abell was five years old, his mother and her new husband, columnist Drew Pearson, took custody of him while on the British island of Sark, claiming that George had taken the child overseas without his mother's permission. Abell later edited Drew Pearson Diaries, 1949-1959 (1974).

He was married to Bess Abell, until her death in 2020. She served as White House Social Secretary under President Lyndon B. Johnson. They were close personal friends with Johnson and his wife, Lady Bird Johnson, who hosted Abell's wedding reception.

Abell died on September 19, 2026, at the age of 94.

== Career ==
On September 25, 1968, President Lyndon B. Johnson named Abell to become Chief of Protocol at the U.S. State Department, and he took office less than a week later. Abell resigned on January 20, 1969, after Richard Nixon won the presidential election and the Democratic Party lost control of the White House. Nixon named Emil Mosbacher, Jr. to succeed Abell as Chief of Protocol.

Abell later became a lawyer and the French-American Executive Committee co-chair of the Association du Mouvement des Français de l'Étranger.
