= Nancy Tuckerman =

White House social secretary (1928–2018)

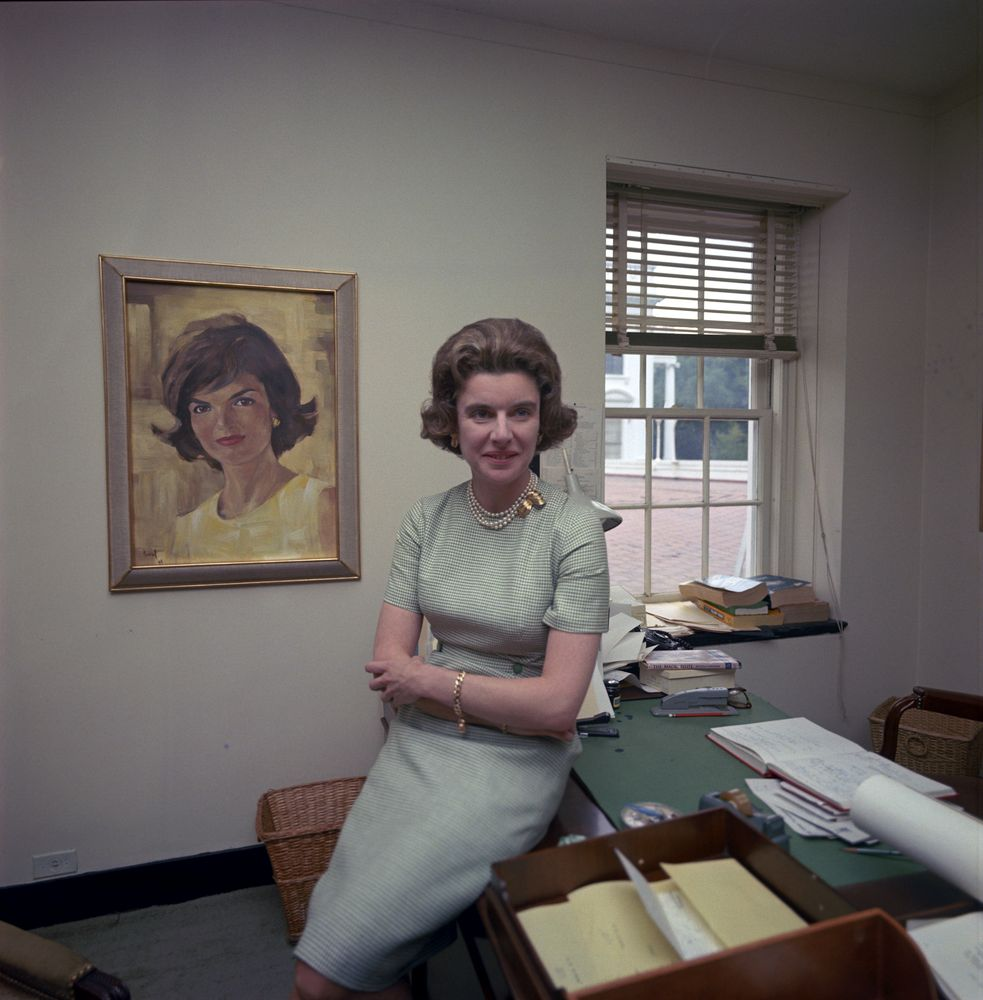
- White House Official Portrait, 1963

12th White House Social Secretary
- In office 1963–1963
- Appointed by: Jacqueline Kennedy
- Preceded by: Letitia Baldrige
- Succeeded by: Bess Abell

Personal details
- Born: Nancy Ludlow Tuckerman; October 24, 1928 Manhattan, New York, U.S.
- Died: August 1, 2018 (aged 89) Salisbury, Connecticut, U.S.

Nancy Ludlow Tuckerman (October 24, 1928 – August 1, 2018) was the White House Social Secretary during the Kennedy administration. After the Kennedy assassination, she remained the personal secretary to Jackie Kennedy until the latter's death in 1994.

== Early life ==
Tuckerman (nicknamed "Tucky") was the daughter of Betty (née Thompson; 1901-1977) and Roger Tuckerman (1898-1967). She grew up in Southampton, New York and Farmington, Connecticut. Her father was a successful Manhattan stockbroker. Her aunt (her father's sister) was the decorator Dorothy Draper.

She had a sister, Cynthia Tuckerman Gay (died 2014) and a brother, Roger Tuckerman. Her nephew John Gay Jr., married Deborah Hearst, of the Hearst family. Her brother Roger was married to Caryn Ryan, daughter of businessman Clendenin J. Ryan. She was also related to Walter Tuckerman. Her great-great-great grandfather was Oliver Wolcott, the 19th Governor of Connecticut.

Jackie Bouvier and Tuckerman met as 8 or 9 year olds at the Chapin School in New York City. Their families spent summers together on Long Island. They later were roommates at Miss Porter's Boarding School in Connecticut after becoming debutantes she attended Vassar at the same time as Jackie, Tuckerman was a bridesmaid at the wedding of Bouvier and John F. Kennedy in 1953.

== Career ==
Tuckerman started her own travel business before being asked by Jackie Kennedy to work for her in the White House after her husband was elected president. In 1963, Jackie Kennedy threw a surprise 35th birthday party for Tuckerman at the White House.

When John F. Kennedy was assassinated, Tuckerman was responsible for responding to the thousands of letters that poured into the White House as condolences for Jackie Kennedy. These letters are now collector's items and are signed by Tuckerman. After leaving the White House, she remained the personal secretary to Jackie Kennedy until the latter's death in 1994. Tuckerman's personal papers reflecting her time in the White House were released in 2015 and are known as the Nancy Tuckerman Files within the Jacqueline Bouvier Kennedy Onassis Personal Papers . In 1994, Tuckerman was left 250,000 U.S. dollars in Jackie Kennedy's last will and testament.

In the 1970s, Tuckerman worked in public relations for Olympic Airways, which was owned by Aristotle Onassis; in that role, she helped develop the first New York City Marathon. She also co-authored a revised edition of Amy Vanderbilt’s Complete Book of Etiquette in 1995. A private person, she apparently never gave an interview or wrote a book about her relationship with Jackie Kennedy Onassis. She spoke with author William Kuhn in preparation for his book, Reading Jackie. She lived her retirement in Salisbury, Connecticut.

In the 2016 biographical film Jackie, Tuckerman is portrayed by actress Greta Gerwig.

== Death ==
Tuckerman died on August 1, 2018, of chronic obstructive pulmonary disease, at an assisted-living center in Salisbury, Connecticut. She was 89.

Political offices
Preceded by Letitia Baldrige	White House Social Secretary; 1963–1963	Succeeded by Bess Abell
