= Dorothy Draper =

American interior decorator (1889–1969)

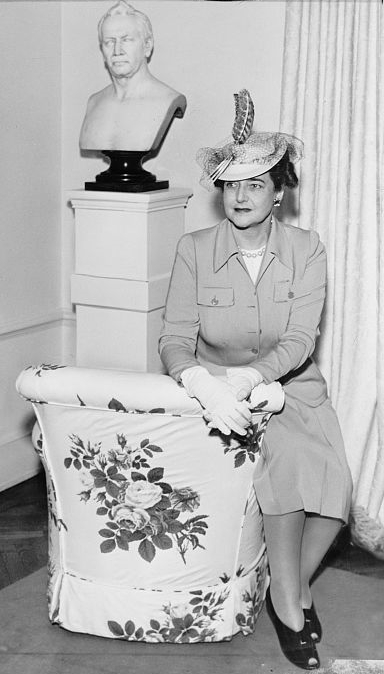
- Dorothy Draper in 1942
- Born: Dorothy Tuckerman; November 22, 1889; Tuxedo Park, New York, U.S.
- Died: March 11, 1969 (aged 79); Cleveland, Ohio, U.S.
- Education: Brearley School
- Spouse: George Draper (m. 1912; div. 1930)
- Relatives: Nancy Tuckerman (niece)

Dorothy Draper (November 22, 1889 – March 11, 1969) was an American interior decorator. Stylistically very anti-minimalist, she used bright, exuberant colors and large prints that encompassed whole walls. She incorporated black and white tiles, rococo scrollwork, and baroque plasterwork, design elements now considered defining elements of the Hollywood Regency style of interior decoration.

== Early life ==
She was born into the upper-class Tuckerman family in Tuxedo Park, New York, one of the first gated communities in the United States. Her parents were Paul Tuckerman (1856–1940) and Susan (née Minturn) Tuckerman (1866–1956). In addition to the house in Tuxedo Park, the family had a Manhattan townhouse and a summer cottage in Newport, Rhode Island Her brother Roger was the father of Nancy Tuckerman, the 12th White House Social Secretary who was appointed by Jackie Kennedy.

Her maternal grandparents were John Wendell Minturn (son of Robert Bowne Minturn) and Louisa (née Aspinwall) Minturn (daughter of William Henry Aspinwall). Draper's great-grandfather, Oliver Wolcott, was a signer of the Declaration of Independence. Drapers's cousin, Sister Parish, would also become a major interior designer of the 20th century.

Educated primarily at home by a governess and tutors, Draper spent two years at the Brearley School in New York City. The family took yearly trips to Europe, and she was a debutante in 1907.

According to Donald Albrecht, the curator of architecture and design at the Museum of the City of New York, Draper's "background not only provided Draper with a valuable network of clients and an innate sense of entitlement and authority, but also offered her a first-hand acquaintance with the historical styles that she would freely interpret and transform."

== Career ==
After Dorothy's 1912 marriage to George Draper, the couple bought and sold houses, which allowed her an opportunity to cultivate a flair for decorating. She redecorated her homes in such style that other high society friends began to do the same for their homes. Encouraged by her friends, Draper started Architectural Clearing House in 1925, "arguably the first official interior design business." After several successful apartment lobby renovations, Draper changed the firm's name to Dorothy Draper and Company in 1929.

Draper's first big break came in the early 1930s when Douglas Elliman hired her to redecorate the Carlyle Hotel on Madison Avenue in Manhattan. This would be the first of many important hotel commissions. Draper was again hired by Elliman to redecorate a block of former tenement homes (today known as Sutton Place) because prospective buyers were not purchasing the homes. She painted all the buildings black with white trim and added colors to the doors.

Draper did a great deal of hotel design, including the Sherry-Netherland in New York, the Drake in Chicago, the Fairmont in San Francisco. At the height of the Depression, she spent $10 million designing the Palácio Quitandinha in Petrópolis, Rio de Janeiro. Also during the Depression, she wrote the Ask Dorothy Draper column which ran in 70 newspapers, and advised people to "take that red and paint your front door with it," and many people followed her advice. They also bought more than a million yards of her signature cabbage rose fabric.

In 1937, Draper created a top-to-bottom decorative scheme for the exclusive Hampshire House apartment hotel, giving the lobby a bold black and white checkerboard floor, a thick glass Art Deco mantelpiece surround, Victorian-style wing chairs, and neo-Baroque plaster decorations. She found artisans in Brooklyn who could fashion enormous scroll-and-shell bas-reliefs, floral swags and multi-arm chandeliers. Her use of sliding glass doors rather than shower curtains at Hampshire House was considered innovative.

In the early 1950s, Packard hired Draper to harmonize the colors and fabrics of their automobile interiors. Draper's 1954 concept for the cafeteria at New York's Metropolitan Museum of Art, dubbed the Dorotheum, featured birdcage chandeliers and a skylighted canopy. One of Draper's last projects was the 1957 International Hotel at Idlewild Airport (today John F. Kennedy Airport) in New York.

She retired in 1960, and after her death in 1969, Carlton Varney purchased Draper's company.

=== Greenbrier Hotel ===
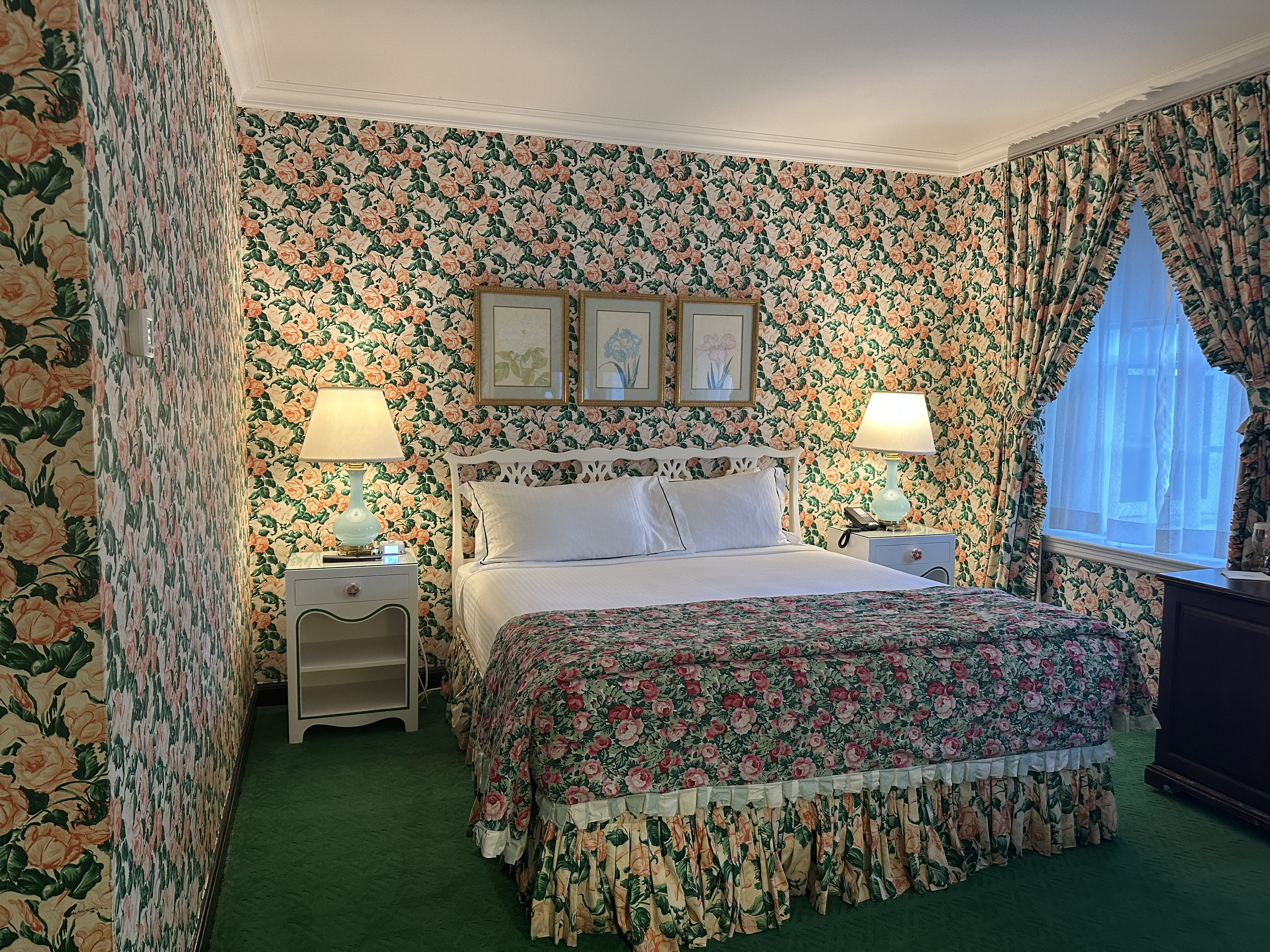
Draper interior at the Greenbrier

One of Dorothy Draper's most famous designs was The Greenbrier Hotel in White Sulphur Springs, West Virginia. During World War II it was used as a military hospital. After the war the Chesapeake and Ohio Railway repurchased the property and Dorothy Draper was retained to redecorate the entire resort. She designed everything from matchbook covers to menus to staff uniforms. Draper transformed the Greenbrier in 16 months. "Draperizing" 600-plus guestrooms and all the public areas took 45,000 yards of fabric, 15000 rolls of wallpaper and 40,000 gallons of paint. In exchange for her work at The Greenbrier, Draper picked up the highest fee ever paid a decorator. The $4.2 million renovation was unveiled at a house party featuring such society guests as the Duke and Duchess of Windsor and Bing Crosby. At the Greenbrier most of the public rooms were given different themes. For example, one was a pink ballroom so that the ladies of that era's faces would appear to be blushing. In the blue room next door there were busts of United States presidents' heads. Draper thought that some of the presidents were not attractive enough, so she modified their busts to appear more handsome. Dorothy was the head designer of the hotel until the 1960s when she then passed the job off to her protégé, Carleton Varney. By 1963 Varney, who succeeded Dorothy Draper as the president of the firm, had taken over the job of maintaining and subtly changing the décor of The Greenbrier. Since then, there have been many changes to the Greenbrier, such as the hidden vault built for emergency use by the United States Congress during the time of the cold war. Other changes were a Dorothy Draper-themed restaurant, a new casino, and updates to the property as a whole.

=== Style ===
Draper created a new style known as "Modern Baroque," adding a modern flair to a classical style. She used dramatic interior color schemes, and trademark cabbage-rose chintz. She promoted shiny black ceilings, acid-green woodwork and cherry-red floors, believing that "Lovely, clear colors have a vital effect on our mental happiness." She also chose very dramatic and contrasting color schemes, such as black with white and adding in some bits of color. She combined different colors, fabrics, and patterns together, combining stripes with floral patterns. She often used large, oversized details and numerous mirrors. All of the colors and patterns contributed to her dramatic design now referred to as "the Draper touch." The opposite of minimalism, her designs were incorporated in homes, hotels, restaurants, theaters, and department stores.

By 1937, Draper had become a household name whose aesthetic enthusiasm was adopted by suburban housewives. F. Schumacher sold more than a million yards of her cabbage rose chintz in the 1930s and 1940s. The Draper bedroom scheme of wide pink and white wallpaper, chenille bedspreads, and organdy curtains soon became ubiquitous across the country.

== Personal life ==
In 1912, Draper was married to Dr. George Draper, the personal doctor to U.S. President Franklin D. Roosevelt after he was diagnosed with polio. Eleanor Roosevelt and Dorothy were cousins and good friends growing up, so the relationship between the two families grew. Together, the Drapers had three children, before divorcing in 1930.

Draper suffered from Alzheimer's disease towards the end of her life. She died in Cleveland, Ohio, on March 11, 1969. After a funeral in Newport, Rhode Island, she was buried at Saint Mary's Episcopal Churchyard in Portsmouth, Rhode Island.

=== Legacy ===
In 2004, her 1941 book Entertaining is Fun! How to Be a Popular Hostess, was reissued, which had a hot pink, polka-dotted cover and was a best seller.

In May 2006, the Museum of the City of New York held an exhibition of Draper's work, curated by Donald Albrecht and designed by the Manhattan studio Pure+Applied, called "The High Style of Dorothy Draper." He has said, "Taking an eighteenth-century chair normally done in wood and making it in clear plastic is a Dorothy Draper kind of thing. And she is a fascinating person. All of her tips must have been really great for housewives in the fifties. To have this woman telling them, 'Don’t be afraid! Paint the door green!'" Draper-designed furniture was lent by The Greenbrier Hotel and The Arrowhead Springs resort—two of her best-known projects. A 9-foot-tall (2.7 m) white "bird-cage" chandelier that Draper designed for the Metropolitan Museum of Art's Dorotheum cafe was also on display.

From December 2006 through July 2007, the Women's Museum in Dallas, Texas hosted "In the Pink: The Legendary Life of Dorothy Draper." It featured archival photographs of Draper's work from The Stoneleigh Hotel and the St. Anthony. The exhibition was designed by Pure+Applied of New York. The exhibition then moved to the Museum of Art in Fort Lauderdale from February through June 2008.

In 2006, Dorothy Draper was featured in an exhibition done in her memory in the Museum of New York City. The exhibition moved from New York City to Texas, and then to Florida.

Draper is considered a major influence on several modern designers, including Kelly Wearstler and Jonathan Adler.

== Published works ==
- Dorothy Draper, ed. (2004) [1941]. Entertaining is Fun! How to Be a Popular Hostess. Rizzoli. ISBN 0-8478-2619-8. (Reprint)
- Dorothy Draper, Decorating is Fun!: How to Be Your Own Decorator. New York: Doubleday, Doran & Company, 1939.
- Dorothy Draper, 365 Shortcuts to Home Decorating. New York: Dodd, Mead, and Company, 1965.
