= Mary Jane McCaffree =

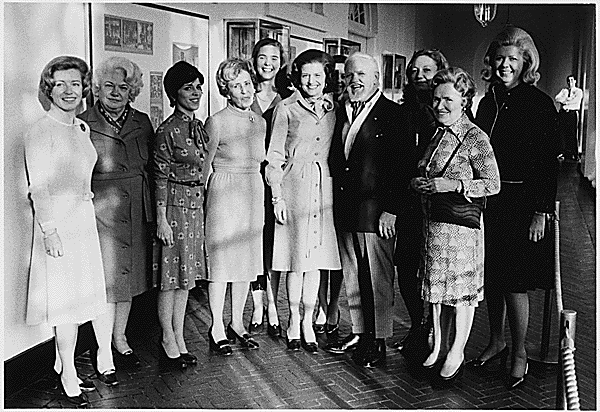
- McCaffree with other social secretaries

10th White House Social Secretary
- In office 1955–1961
- Appointed by: Mamie Eisenhower
- Preceded by: Edith Bengal Helm
- Succeeded by: Letitia Baldrige

Personal details
- Born: Mary Jane Fleming; October 28, 1911 New York City, U.S.
- Died: July 23, 2018 (aged 106) Juno Beach, Florida, U.S.
- Occupation: Public relations Protocol expert

Mary Jane McCaffree Monroe (née Fleming; October 28, 1911 – July 23, 2018) was a White House Social Secretary during the Eisenhower administration and a press and personal secretary for First Lady Mamie Eisenhower. She also served as a protocol specialist in the office of the Chief of Protocol and co-wrote a book on the subject.

== Early years ==
Born Mary Jane Fleming in New York City, she worked as a secretary for different executives of the 1939 New York World's Fair and as a secretary at a steel company and a distillery. In 1952, she became office manager for the Citizens for Eisenhower headquarters and began serving as Mamie Eisenhower's personal secretary in the 1952 presidential campaign.

== The Eisenhowers ==
When Dwight D. Eisenhower won the presidential election, McCaffree went with the Eisenhowers to the White House and remained there for the duration of both of his terms (1953–1961). She was not only his social secretary, but she remained the now-First Lady's private and press secretary, helping her to answer nearly 1,000 letters a month and dozens of daily requests for public appearances.

First Ladies in the past have had social secretaries and clerks, but the positions were never recognized as part of the institutionalized presidency, until McCaffree was listed in the Congressional Directory's top White House personnel as "Acting Secretary to the President's Wife."

== Protocol specialist ==
Ten years after Eisenhower's presidency, McCaffree was a protocol specialist in the Office of the Chief of Protocol, part of the State Department, from 1971 to 1975. This led to her co-writing a book, titled Protocol: The Complete Handbook of Diplomatic, Official and Social Usage (ISBN 978-1-935451-16-7), in 1977.

== Personal life ==
While working at the White House, she married Floyd McCaffree, a history and political science professor, who died in 1963. Her second husband, Harry Monroe Jr., an auto dealer, died in 2004.

Mary Jane died at age 106 in Juno Beach, Florida, on July 23, 2018.

Political offices
Preceded by Edith Bengal Helm	White House Social Secretary; 1955–1961	Succeeded by Letitia Baldrige
