= Lucy Winchester (secretary) =

American social secretary (1937–2025)

Lucy Alexander Winchester
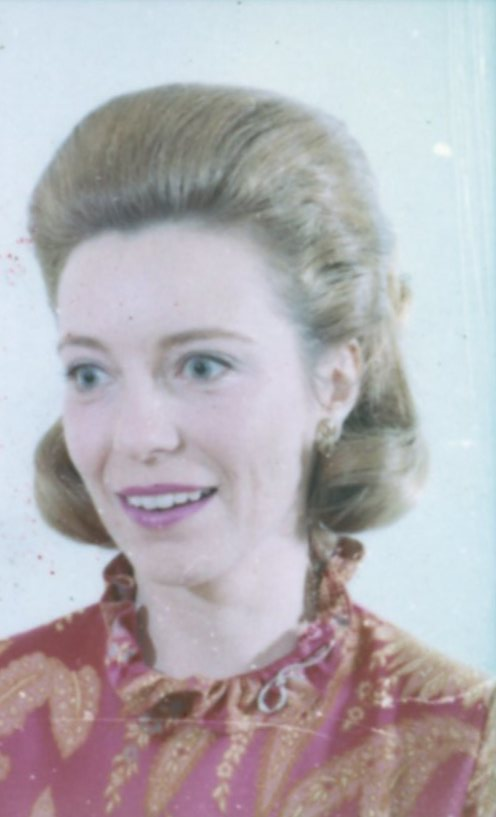

14th White House Social Secretary
- In office 1969–1974
- President: Richard Nixon
- Preceded by: Bess Abell
- Succeeded by: Nancy Lammerding Ruwe

Personal details
- Born: Lucy Moulthrop Alexander; January 11, 1937 Lexington, Kentucky, U.S.
- Died: September 4, 2025 (aged 88)
- Spouse(s): William I. Winchester (m. 1962; div. 1966) Ned Breathitt (m. 1988; died 2003)
- Education: Sweet Briar College; Finch College; University of Kentucky

Lucy Moulthrop Winchester (née Alexander; January 11, 1937 – September 4, 2025) was an American socialite and farmer who served as the 14th White House Social Secretary during the entirety of the Presidency of Richard Nixon and First Lady Pat Nixon.

== Early life and career ==
Lucy Moulthrop Alexander was born in Lexington, Kentucky on January 11, 1937. She attended Sweet Briar College and Finch College, and earned a bachelor's degree from the University of Kentucky. Winchester worked as a clerk and typist in a variety of roles, including the Leo Burnett Company in New York City and a clerk and guide at the United States Mission to the United Nations.

During Winchester's first marriage, she was a housewife and owner and manager of a family farm. In 1968, she was a volunteer for the Nixon-Agnew ticket.

== Government positions ==
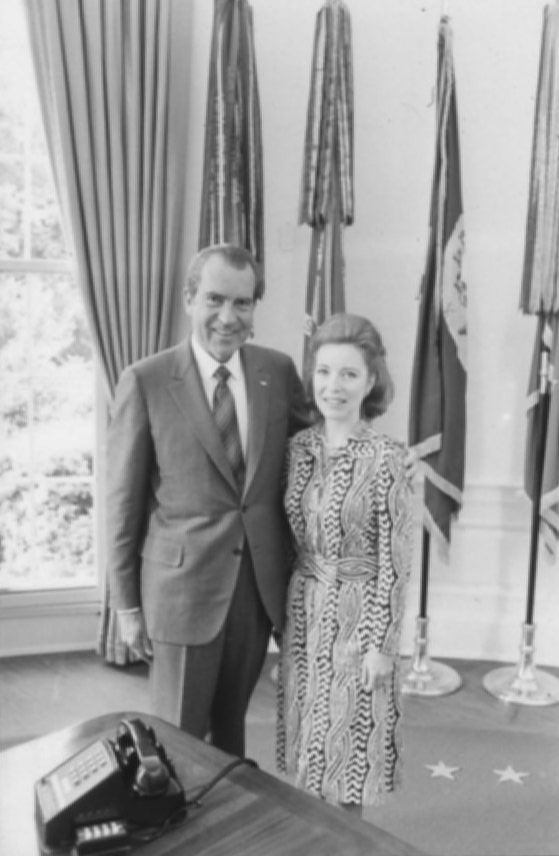
Winchester with President Richard Nixon in 1971

Winchester worked in the White House from 1969 until Nixon's resignation in 1974. After Nixon left office, she was named Assistant Chief of Protocol at the United States Department of State and remained in close contact with the Nixon family.

Winchester's files are preserved by the White House Historical Association and the Richard Nixon Presidential Library and Museum. She was also invited to a private luncheon and tea with First Lady Laura Bush.

== Personal life and death ==
In 1962, she married William I. Winchester. They divorced in 1966.

Winchester was married to former Governor of Kentucky Edward T. Breathitt, Jr .

Winchester died on September 4, 2025, at the age of 88.

Political offices
Preceded by Bess Abell	White House Social Secretary; 1969–1974	Succeeded by Nancy Lammerding Ruwe
