= Jeremy Bernard =

29th White House Social Secretary

Jeremy M. Bernard
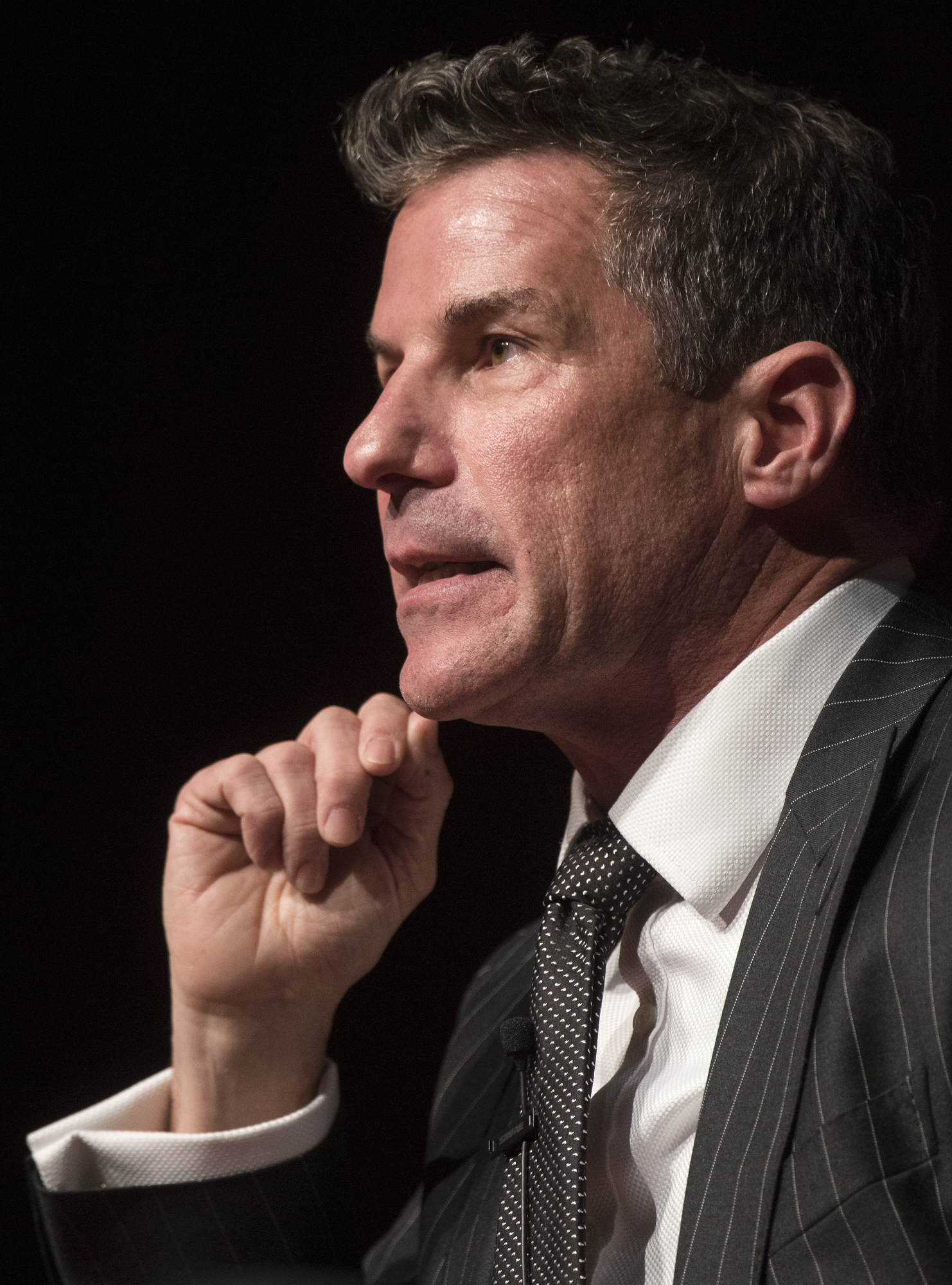
- Jeremy Bernard at the LBJ Presidential Library in 2018.

29th White House Social Secretary
- In office March 1, 2011 – April 2015
- President: Barack Obama
- Deputy: Deesha Dyer
- Preceded by: Julianna Smoot
- Succeeded by: Deesha Dyer

Personal details
- Born: November 4, 1961 (age 65) San Antonio, Texas, United States
- Party: Democratic
- Education: Hunter College (Incomplete)

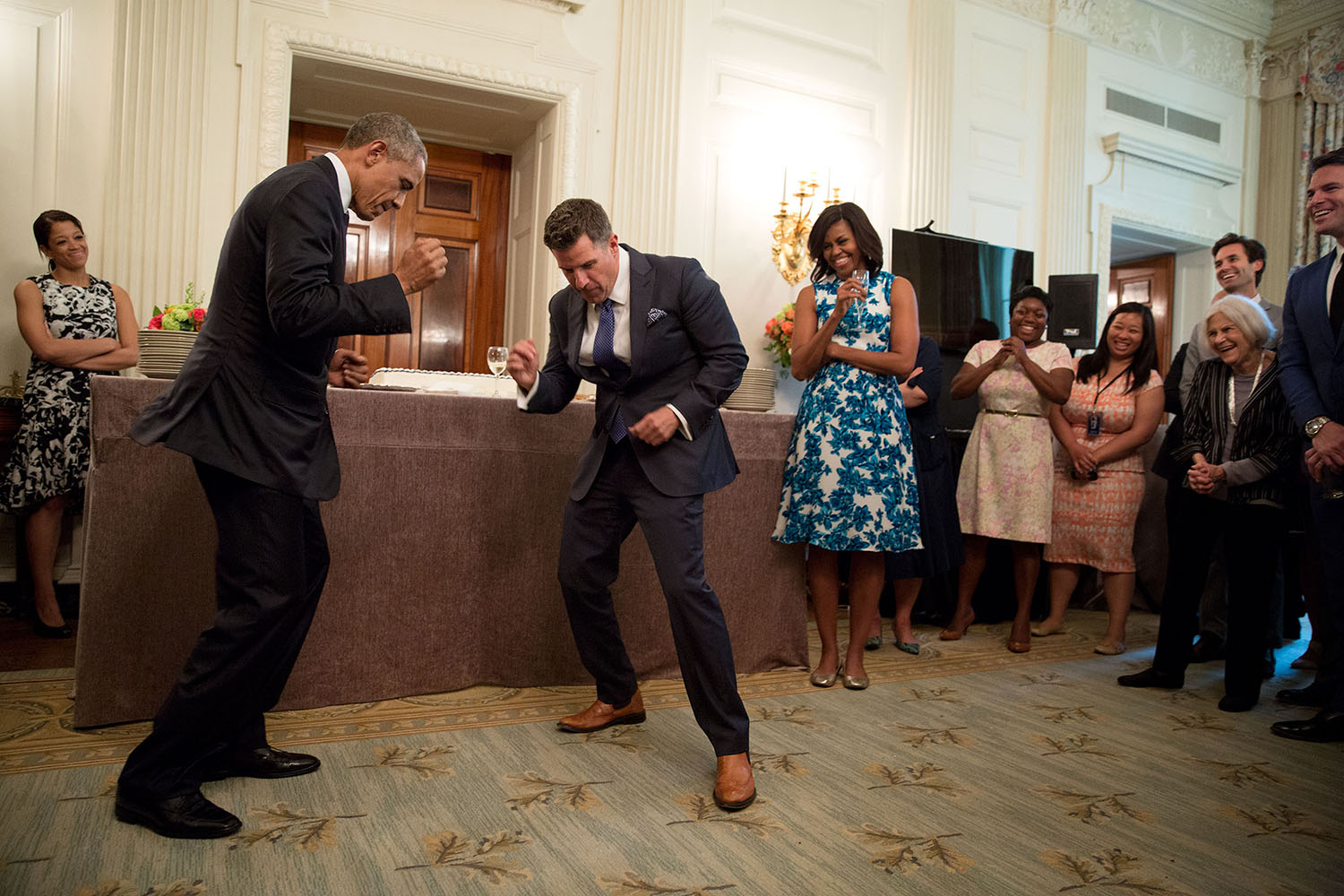
'Show us the Jeremy dance'

Jeremy Mill Bernard (born November 4, 1961) served as the White House social secretary. Bernard was appointed to the position by President Barack Obama on February 25, 2011. He was the first male, as well as the first gay individual, to serve as the White House social secretary.

== Early life ==
Bernard was born to Herschel and Loretta (Utterback) Bernard and raised in San Antonio, Texas, where he attended TMI — The Episcopal School of Texas. His father was a fundraiser for Robert F. Kennedy and Ted Kennedy. Bernard attended Hunter College in New York City, but did not graduate.

== Career ==
Bernard is a prominent Democratic fundraiser and gay rights advocate who served for eight years on the Democratic National Committee. He worked in the Obama administration in Washington as the White House liaison to the National Endowment for the Humanities and later, in Paris, as senior adviser and chief of staff to the United States ambassador to France.

== Works ==
- Treating People Well: The Extraordinary Power of Civility at Work and in Life. Scribner. 2018. ISBN 978-1-5011-5800-1.

Political offices
Preceded by Julianna Smoot	White House Social Secretary; 2011–2015	Succeeded by Deesha Dyer
