= Anna Cristina Niceta Lloyd =

Italian-American event planner (born 1970)

Rickie Niceta

31st White House Social Secretary
- In office February 8, 2017 – January 6, 2021
- Appointed by: Melania Trump
- President: Donald Trump
- Preceded by: Deesha Dyer
- Succeeded by: Carlos Elizondo

Personal details
- Born: May 22, 1970 (age 56) Milan, Italy
- Party: Republican
- Spouse: Thomas Lloyd (m. 2006; div. 2021)
- Children: 2
- Education: Hollins College (BA)

Anna Cristina "Rickie" Niceta Lloyd (born May 22, 1970) is an Italian-American event planner who served as the White House Social Secretary for U.S. President Donald Trump. She was appointed by First Lady Melania Trump on February 8, 2017. Prior to her role at the White House, Lloyd worked for Design Cuisine, a catering company.

She resigned on January 6, 2021, following the 2021 storming of the United States Capitol.

== Education ==
Niceta Lloyd is a graduate of Hollins College. Niceta Lloyd is a graduate of St. Timothy's School.

== Career ==
As an account executive for Design Cuisine, Lloyd supported the Joint Committee on Inaugural Ceremonies in providing catering services for five presidential inaugurations, as well as numerous state luncheons, summits, and conferences in coordination with the Office of the Chief of Protocol. Most recently, she participated in the planning and execution of events for President Trump's 2017 inaugural celebrations.

== Personal ==
Niceta Lloyd was married to Thomas Lloyd, with whom she had two children. Thomas Lloyd is the grandson of Stacy Barcroft Lloyd Jr. and Rachel Lambert Mellon. Mellon was perhaps best known for helping to redesign the White House Rose Garden with Jacqueline Kennedy in the early 1960s. The Lloyds divorced in 2021.

Political offices
Preceded by Deesha Dyer	White House Social Secretary; 2017–2021	Succeeded by Carlos Elizondo
