= Letitia Baldrige =

American public relations executive, etiquette expert, and Kennedy staffer (1926–2012)

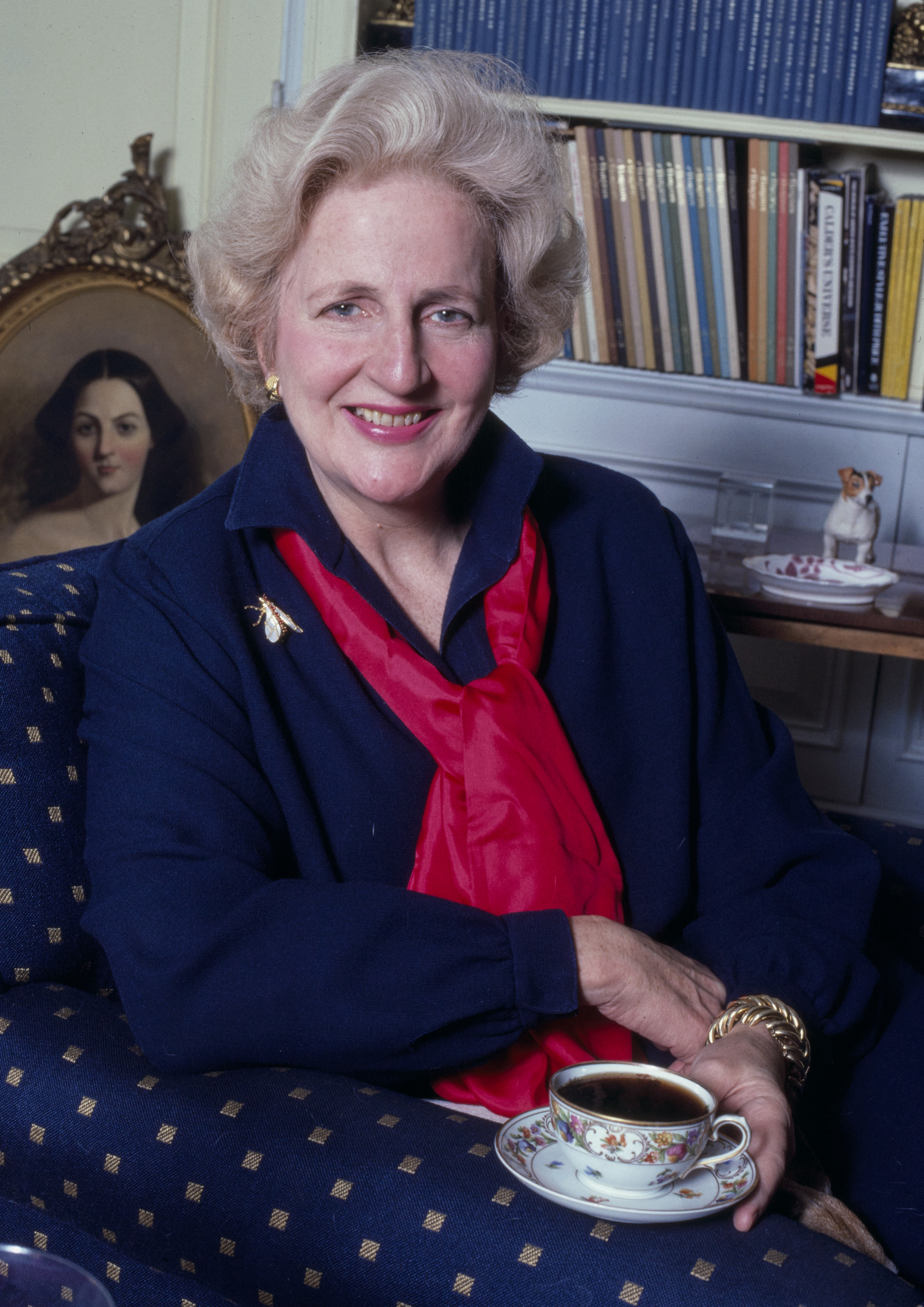
- Baldridge, 1970–1987

11th White House Social Secretary
- In office 1961–1963
- Appointed by: Jacqueline Kennedy
- Preceded by: Mary Jane McCaffree
- Succeeded by: Nancy Tuckerman

Personal details
- Born: February 9, 1926 Miami, Florida, U.S.
- Died: October 29, 2012 (aged 86) Bethesda, Maryland, U.S.
- Spouse: Robert Hollensteiner (m. 1964)
- Children: 2
- Occupation: Public relations executive Etiquette expert

Letitia "Tish" Baldrige (February 9, 1926 – October 29, 2012) was an American etiquette expert, public relations executive and author who was most famous for serving as Jacqueline Kennedy's Social Secretary.

Known as the "Doyenne of Decorum", she wrote a newspaper column, ran her own PR firm, and, along with updating Amy Vanderbilt's Complete Book of Etiquette, she published 20 books and appeared on Late Night with David Letterman and the cover of Time magazine.

== Early life ==
Letitia Baldrige was born February 9, 1926, in Miami, Florida, and grew up in Omaha, Nebraska, the youngest child of Republican Congressman Howard Malcolm Baldrige and his wife, Regina (née Connell). Her brother was Howard Malcolm Baldrige, Jr., the initial Secretary of Commerce during the Ronald Reagan administration.

Baldrige attended Miss Porter's School in Farmington, CT, where she met Jacqueline Bouvier, the future First Lady. The two also attended Vassar College together, from which Baldrige graduated in 1946 with a bachelor's degree in psychology.

== Career ==
=== Early years ===
After first being denied a position and told to improve her secretarial skills, she reapplied and was hired by the State Department as social secretary to David K.E. Bruce, US ambassador to France. After three years she was appointed secretary in Rome to the American ambassador to Italy, Clare Boothe Luce, followed by a position as director of public relations for the jeweller Tiffany & Co.

Although then a registered Republican, in 1960 she was invited to work for the Kennedy campaign in Massachusetts once he secured the Democratic presidential nomination, going on to work officially for the First Lady after his victory. Baldridge served in the post of White House Social Secretary, coordinating aspects of the Inauguration, receptions, and state dinners. Saying she "had had it" with the long days in Washington and serving the administration on overseas trips, she resigned early in 1963, but returned briefly later that year to aid Jacqueline Kennedy after President Kennedy's assassination in November of that year.

=== After the Kennedy White House ===
She served on the board of directors of the Malcolm Baldrige National Quality Award. She also did significant charity work with Jane Goodall to help fundraise for the preservation of habitats for wild chimpanzees.

In 1964, the year after marrying real estate developer Robert Hollensteiner, whom she met while working for a Kennedy family firm, she founded her own PR business, Letitia Baldrige Enterprises, Chicago. Earning the nickname the "Doyenne of Decorum" with a newspaper column and a string of successful books, in 1978 she appeared on the November 28th cover of Time. She continued working into late life, publishing books in every decade from the 1950s, her final book being, Taste: Acquiring What Money Can't Buy, released in 2007.

== Death ==
Baldrige died of cardiac complications at a nursing facility in Bethesda, Maryland, on October 29, 2012. She was survived by her husband, Robert Hollensteiner, and their two children, Clare and Malcolm.

== Bibliography ==
- Roman Candle, 1956
- Tiffany Table Settings, 1958
- Of Diamonds and Diplomats, 1968
- Home, 1972
- Juggling: The Art of Balancing Marriage, Motherhood, and Career, 1976
- The Amy Vanderbilt Complete Book of Etiquette, 1978
- Amy Vanderbilt’s Everyday Etiquette, 1979
- Entertainers, 1981
- Letitia Baldrige’s Complete Guide to Executive Manners, 1985
- Letitia Baldrige’s Complete Guide to a Great Social Life, 1987
- Letitia Baldrige’s Complete Guide to the New Manners for the '90s, 1989
- Public Affairs, Private Relations, 1990 (a novel)
- Letitia Baldrige’s New Complete Guide to Executive Manners, 1993
- Letitia Baldrige’s More than Manners! Raising Today's Kids to Have Kind Manners and Good Hearts, 1997
- In the Kennedy Style: Magical Evenings in the Kennedy White House (with Rene Verdon), 1998
- Legendary Brides: From the Most Romantic Weddings Ever, Inspired Ideas for Today’s Brides, 2000
- A Lady, First: My Life in the White House and the American Embassies of Paris and Rome, 2001
- Letitia Baldrige’s New Manners for New Times: A Complete Guide to Etiquette, 2003
- The Kennedy Mystique (with Jon Goodman, Hugh Sidey, Robert Dallek and Barbara Baker Burrows), 2006
- Taste: Acquiring What Money Can't Buy, 2007

Political offices
Preceded by Mary Jane McCaffree	White House Social Secretary; 1961–1963	Succeeded by Nancy Tuckerman
