= Julianna Smoot =

American political aide and fundraiser for the Democratic Party

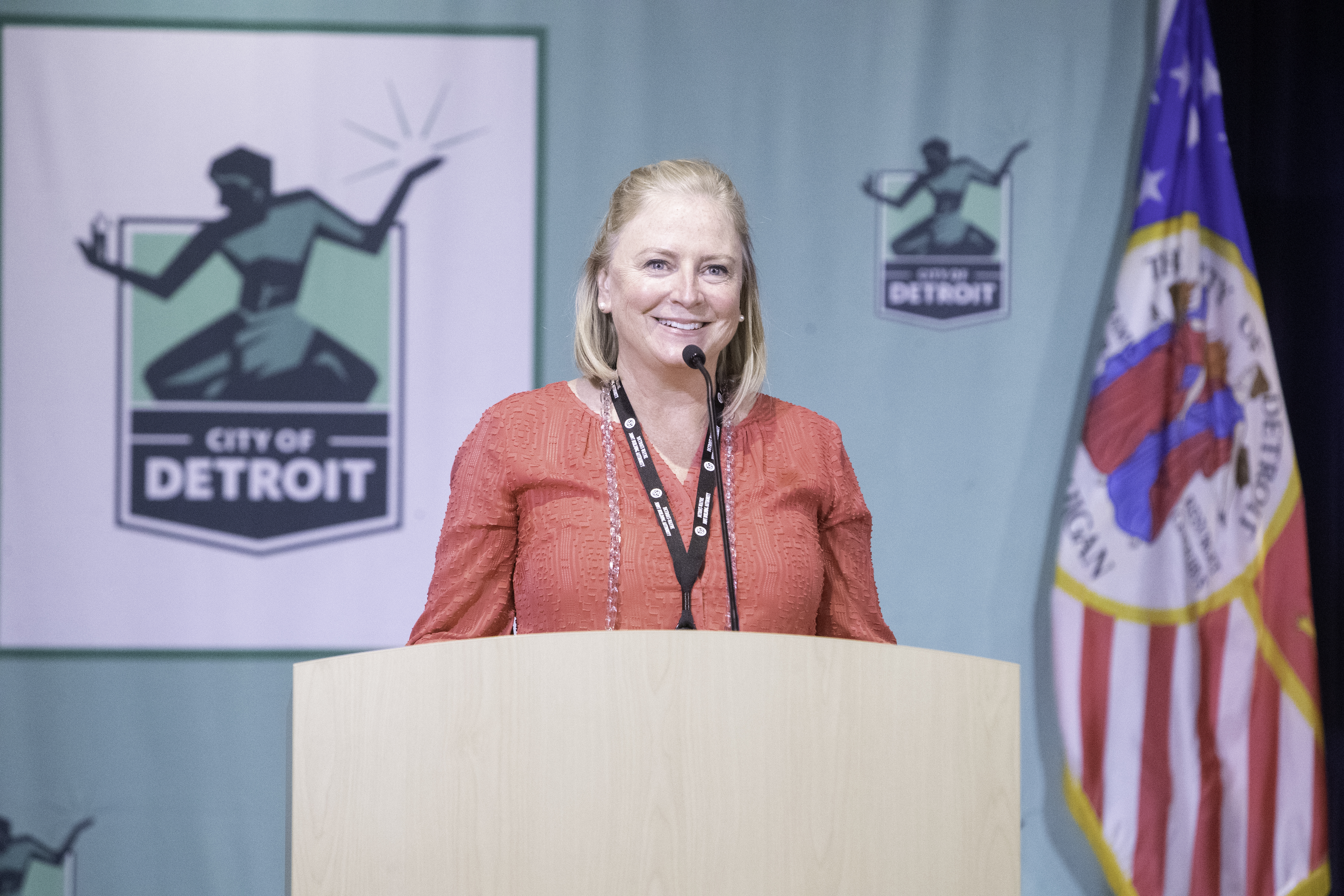
- Smoot in 2021 as Detroit's Chief Development Officer

28th White House Social Secretary
- In office February 26, 2010 – March 1, 2011
- President: Barack Obama
- Preceded by: Desirée Rogers
- Succeeded by: Jeremy Bernard

Personal details
- Born: Julianna Skinner Smoot; 1967 (age 58–59) North Carolina, U.S.
- Party: Democratic
- Spouse: Lon Johnson (m. 2011)
- Education: Smith College (BA)

Julianna Smoot is an American political aide and fundraiser for the Democratic Party. She served as a Deputy Manager of Barack Obama's 2012 presidential reelection campaign, having previously served as White House Social Secretary, Deputy Assistant to the President. and Chief of Staff to United States Trade Representative Ron Kirk. Smoot previously served as a professional fundraiser for the Democratic Party. She was the national finance director for Barack Obama 2008 presidential campaign. Under her direction, the campaign raised $32.5 million during the second quarter of 2007 and by election day, more money than any campaign in American history. She was named Social Secretary after her predecessor, Desirée Rogers resigned on February 26, 2010.

== Early life and education ==
Smoot was born in North Carolina, where she was a debutante in Raleigh and the surrounding area. She graduated from Smith College in 1989, where she was a classmate of Stephanie Cutter.

== Career ==
She took leave from her job at the American Trial Lawyers Association to be finance director of John Edwards's 1998 campaign for U.S. Senate. She met Pete Rouse and Steve Hildebrand on Senate Majority Leader Tom Daschle's unsuccessful reelection campaign in 2004, where she raised $21 million. Rouse and Hildebrand brought her to the first Obama presidential campaign in January, 2007. She has also held positions with Senator Richard Durbin of Illinois and Jay Rockefeller of West Virginia. She worked in Senatorial campaigns for Chris Dodd and Harry Reid.

During the 2006 election cycle, she raised record sums as finance director for the Democratic Senatorial Campaign Committee, under Chuck Schumer.

Smoot was, according to a press report, declared "MVP for the first fundraising quarter" due to her success in raising money for the Obama presidential campaign in 2007.

In 2013 she founded the political consulting firm STG Results with fellow Obama staffer Scott Tewes. Smoot is now serving on the board of nonprofit Obama Foundation, which was officially set up for constructing the Barack Obama Presidential Library and Museum. She is also a founder and senior advisor of WaterWorks Fund, a funding portal for sustainable water solutions.

== Personal life ==
Her husband, Lon Johnson, was briefly the chairperson of the Michigan Democratic Party until he resigned in June 2015 to run for the United States House of Representatives in Michigan's 1st District and was an unsuccessful candidate in the 2012 election for the 103rd district in the Michigan House of Representatives. His wife's employment in the Obama reelection effort was a campaign issue.

Political offices
Preceded by Desirée Rogers	White House Social Secretary; 2010–2011	Succeeded by Jeremy Bernard
