= Desirée Rogers =

American corporate executive

- Rogers at a press conference in November 2009

27th White House Social Secretary
- In office January 20, 2009 – February 26, 2010
- President: Barack Obama
- Preceded by: Amy Zantzinger
- Succeeded by: Julianna Smoot

Personal details
- Born: Desirée Glapion; June 16, 1959 (age 67) New Orleans, Louisiana, U.S.
- Party: Democratic
- Other political affiliations: Republican
- Spouse: John W. Rogers Jr. (m. 1988; div. 2000)
- Children: 1
- Education: Wellesley College (BA); Harvard University (MBA)

Desirée Glapion Rogers (born June 16, 1959) is an American corporate executive, former White House Social Secretary for President Barack Obama's office and former chief executive officer of Johnson Publishing Company (JPC). As of 2019, Rogers is the CEO of Black Opal, a cosmetics company.

== Early life and education ==
Rogers was born on June 16, 1959, in New Orleans, Louisiana to late Roy Glapion and his wife Joyce. She is a descendant of Creole voodoo priestess Marie Laveau.

Rogers graduated from the Academy of the Sacred Heart in New Orleans in 1977. She earned a Bachelor's degree in political science from Wellesley College in 1981 and got her MBA from Harvard Business School in 1985.

== Career ==
=== Prior to the White House ===
Rogers began her career with AT&T. Soon thereafter, she became an executive for restaurant and real estate developer Larry Levy. In 1990, Rogers was appointed by Republican Governor Jim Edgar, to run the Illinois State Lottery, a $2 billion state agency. She led the agency until 1997. During her tenure, Rogers worked extensively with over 8000 retailers to increase the sale of instant ticket products from 300 million to over 600 million. Rogers attended the 1992 Republican National Convention as an alternate delegate.

In 1997, Rogers was the vice-president of corporate communications for Peoples Energy (PE), which is a natural gas subsidiary of the WEC Energy Group. In late 1999, Rogers and three other minority women quit the board of the Chicago Museum of Contemporary Art to protest what they regarded as a slow pace on diversity issues. They were the only female minority members among the museum's 63 trustees. In September 2001, she became senior vice-president of PE and its utility subsidiaries. In 2002, Rogers attended the Harvard Kennedy School Women and Power Program. In 2003 Rogers was named to the board of Equity Residential, a $15 billion residential real estate investment trust (REIT). In July 2004, Rogers was selected as president of both Peoples Gas and North Shore Gas, the two utility subsidiaries of PE. She was the first female African-American to hold those posts. As PEs president, Rogers improved response times at the customer service center, converted paper records of inspection results to an electronic system, and eliminated a massive backlog of home gas meter inspections. In April 2006, the Illinois Commerce Commission launched an investigation to determine whether employees falsified safety reports on some of its gas pipes and found some discrepancies. Rogers determined the extent of the corrosion-testing problems, installed a new training and auditing regimen, and hired quality-control employees to check compliance work. No leaks were found. Peoples Energy was bought by Wisconsin-based WPS Resources Corporation in July 2006. The merged companies became the Integrys Energy Group in the first quarter of 2007. Rogers initially stayed on as President of Peoples Energy, the gas subsidiaries of the new holding company.

In July 2008, Rogers joined Allstate Financial, a business unit of The Allstate Corporation, to run a new social networking initiative of the company and later became a member of Allstate Financial's executive committee. Rogers is a board member of Blue Cross Blue Shield of Illinois, the Northwestern Memorial Foundation and The Polk Foundation. Rogers is vice-chairman of the Lincoln Park Zoo and serves on the executive committee of Chicago's Museum of Science and Industry. Previously, she served as the Chairman of the Board of the Chicago Children's Museum. Rogers was a major contributor to fund-raisers to help Chicago win its bid to become a finalist for the 2016 Olympics, to which she donated more than US$100,000.

Roger's previous year's income, in a 2009 report, was a $350,000 salary from Allstate Financial, as well as $150,000 in board fees from Equity Residential, a real estate investment trust in which she also held at least $250,000 in stock. She also collected $20,000 in board fees from Blue Cross. Other assets reported in her checking account, stock investments, and mutual funds totaled at least $2 million.

=== At the White House ===
As the White House Social Secretary for President Obama, Rogers was responsible for executing the Obamas' vision of opening the White House to a wider circle of people and making it 'the people's house'. She organized 365 events in her tenure and was recognized for organizing lively get-togethers, particularly with artists and musicians. Rogers aspired to modernize the art collection in the White House Presidential mansion by adding ethnic art. She got recognition for her sense of fashion and style brought to the position.

=== 2009 White House security breach ===
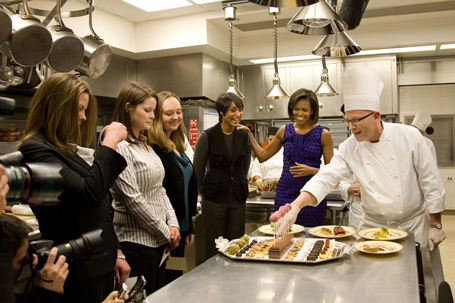
Students from L'Academie de Cuisine, White House Social Secretary Desiree Rogers, First Lady Michelle Obama, and White House pastry chef Bill Yosses.

Rogers was in the center of the controversy surrounding Tareq and Michaele Salahi, where the couple was able to enter, uninvited, a November 2009 state dinner hosted by President Obama in honor of Indian Prime Minister Manmohan Singh. The Secret Service ultimately took the blame for the failure after Democratic-majority members of the House Committee on Homeland Security voted against issuing Rogers a subpoena. According to The Washington Post, details of the dinner planning meeting between Rogers's office and Secret Service personnel are "being guarded by the [Obama] administration as a virtual state secret."

=== After the White House ===
In February 2010, Rogers stepped down from her position at the White House. Rogers was replaced by Julianna Smoot, former chief of staff to the U.S. Trade Representative Ron Kirk. On August 10, 2010, Rogers was named CEO of the Johnson Publishing Company, overseeing publication of Ebony and Jet magazines, the Johnson Archives, and Fashion Fair Cosmetics. She left JPC in June 2017.

Desirée served as the chair of the board of Choose Chicago from 2013 to 2019. In June 2019, she along with Cheryl Mayberry McKissack, acquired Black Opal Cosmetics, a 25-year-old cosmetics and skincare house for women of color. Desirée serves on the public boards of MDC Partners (MDC) and Inspired Entertainment (INSE). She also serves on the boards of World Business Chicago, Donors Choose and Northwestern Hospital. She is on the cabinet of the Conquer Cancer Foundation.

== Memberships ==
- American Gas Association
- Y-Me National Breast Cancer Organization - Trustee
- Commercial Club of Chicago
- Loyola University New Orleans - Trustee
- The Chicago Network
- Young Presidents' Organization (YPO).
- WTTW (PBS affiliate) - Trustee

== Personal life ==
In 1988, Rogers married John W. Rogers Jr. and moved to Chicago, Illinois, where she began her career. They have one daughter together, and the couple got divorced in 2000. Rogers is a former queen of the Zulu Social Aid and Pleasure Club, a 1916-Mardi Gras krewe. Rogers is an Obama family friend. Her former husband, also Obama's Inaugural Co-chair, is a former teammate of Michelle Obama's brother Craig Robinson on the Princeton University basketball team. Rogers is a survivor of breast cancer, following a diagnosis in 2003.

Political offices
Preceded by Amy Zantzinger	White House Social Secretary; 2009–2010	Succeeded by Julianna Smoot
