= Deesha Dyer =

White House Social Secretary from 2015 to 2017

- Deesha Dyer at Preview of State Dinner for Canadian Prime Minister Justin Trudeau in 2016.

30th White House Social Secretary
- In office April 16, 2015 – January 20, 2017
- President: Barack Obama
- Preceded by: Jeremy Bernard
- Succeeded by: Anna Cristina Niceta Lloyd

Deputy White House Social Secretary
- In office 2013 – April 16, 2015
- President: Barack Obama

Personal details
- Born: January 15, 1978 (age 48) Philadelphia, Pennsylvania, U.S.
- Party: Democratic
- Education: Community College of Philadelphia; Milton Hershey School

Deesha Dyer (born 1978) is an American public servant who was the White House Social Secretary for U.S. President Barack Obama from 2015 to 2017. Dyer also was Deputy to the previous Social Secretary, Jeremy Bernard. She is currently the CEO of Hook & Fasten, a social-impact consulting company.

She is a 2019 Resident Fellow for the Harvard Kennedy School Institute of Politics.

In 2024 she released her biography, "Undiplomatic: How My Attitude Created the Best Kind of Trouble".

== Early life and education ==
Dyer grew up in Hershey, Pennsylvania and attended the Milton Hershey School, a boarding school founded by The Hershey Company. She attended the University of Cincinnati, but later dropped out and enrolled in Community College of Philadelphia where she earned an associate degree in women's studies.

== Career ==
Before working at the White House she worked as the executive assistant at PREIT and a freelance writer at the Philadelphia Citypaper. She also started an HIV-awareness program, distributing fliers and condoms at local hip-hop clubs.

=== White House career ===
At age 31, her White House career began as an intern in the Office of Scheduling and Advance in Fall 2009.

Following her internship, Dyer became associate director for scheduling correspondence and then was named hotel program director. In this role, she travelled with the president and first lady and planned lodging accommodations.

She became deputy social secretary and was later promoted to special assistant to the president and social secretary, making her the Obama administration's fourth social secretary and the second of African-American descent. In 2018, she contributed a chapter to West Wingers: Stories from the Dream Chasers, Change Makers, and Hope Creators Inside the Obama White House recounting her experiences in the Obama White House.

== Legacy ==
In 2019, Dyer created the Black Girl 44 Scholarship, which provides financial assistance to Black college women who are interning in politics or public service. The scholarship is housed through Impact of a Vote. The initiative, founded by Dyer, offers free workshops, newsletters, and job postings to help Black college students explore careers in politics and public service.

She founded Hook & Fasten, a social social-impact consulting company, and is the CEO.

Political offices
Preceded by Jeremy Bernard	White House Social Secretary; 2015–2017	Succeeded by Anna Cristina Niceta Lloyd
