= Carlos Elizondo =

American political aide (born 1962)

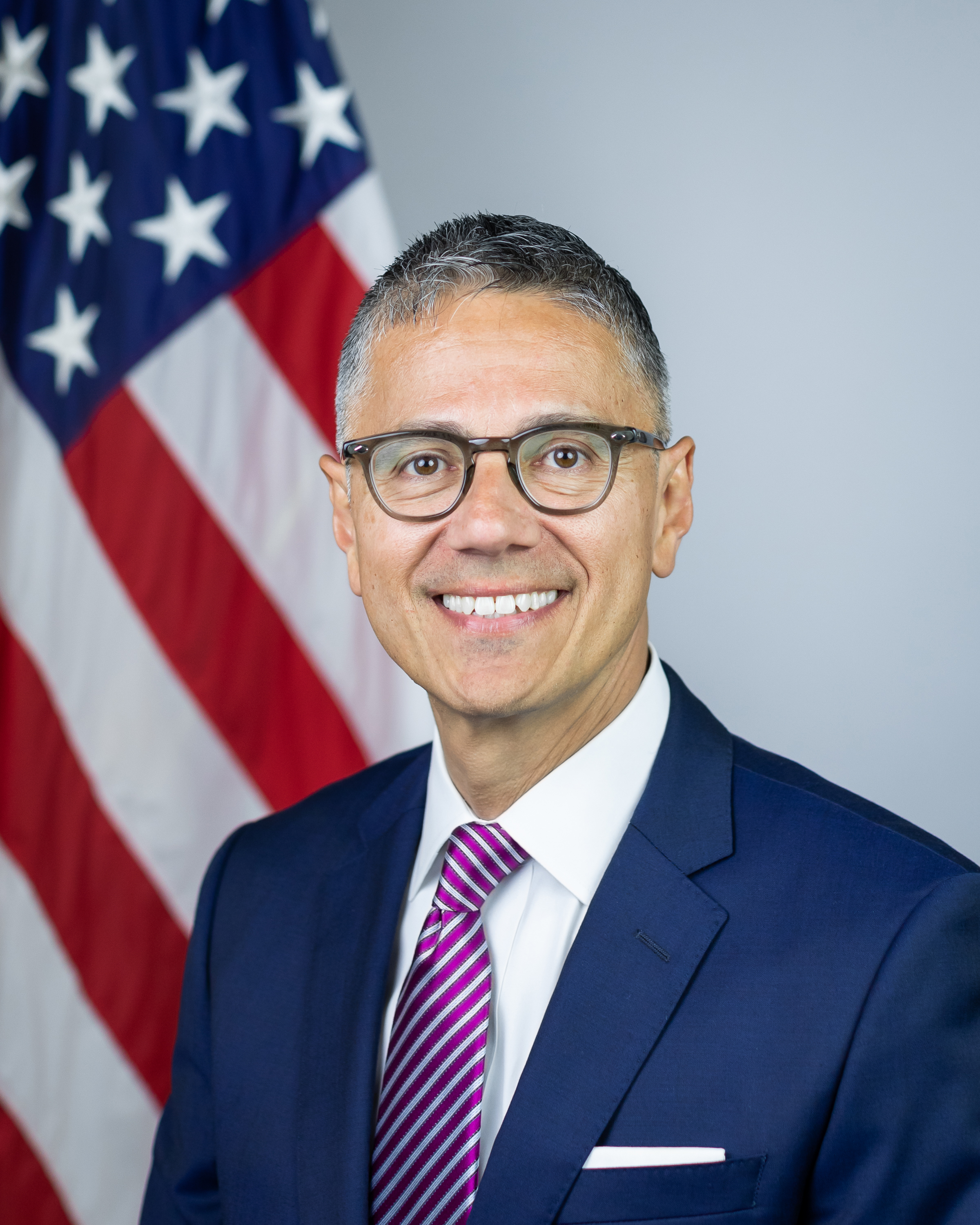
- Official portrait, 2021

White House Social Secretary
- In office January 20, 2021 – January 20, 2025
- President: Joe Biden
- Preceded by: Rickie Niceta
- Succeeded by: Vacant

Personal details
- Born: Carlos Eduardo Elizondo; June 10, 1962 (age 64) Harlingen, Texas, U.S.
- Party: Democratic
- Education: Pontifical College Josephinum (BA)

Carlos Eduardo Elizondo (born June 10, 1962) is an American event planner and political aide who served as White House social secretary from 2021 to 2025. Elizondo previously served as a special assistant and social secretary for Joe Biden and Jill Biden during the Obama administration.

== Early life and education ==
A native of Harlingen, Texas, Elizondo earned a Bachelor of Arts degree in Spanish and Latin American studies from the Pontifical College Josephinum.

== Career ==
From 2009 to 2017, Elizondo served as a special assistant to President Barack Obama and as Social Secretary to Vice President Joe Biden and Second Lady Jill Biden. In this role, he planned and managed all events which were hosted by Biden and his family, including visits by world leaders, members of Congress, and other high-profile visitors. Outside of government, Elizondo worked as the director of events at Georgetown University and the manager of activities and protocol at Walt Disney World.

On November 20, 2020, after winning the presidential election, Biden named Elizondo to be his White House social secretary. He is the first Hispanic individual, second male and second openly gay person to hold the position.

== Personal life ==
Elizondo is openly gay, and resides in Washington, D.C., with his partner.

Political offices
Preceded by Rickie Niceta	White House Social Secretary; 2021–2025	Vacant
