= White House Social Secretary =

Position

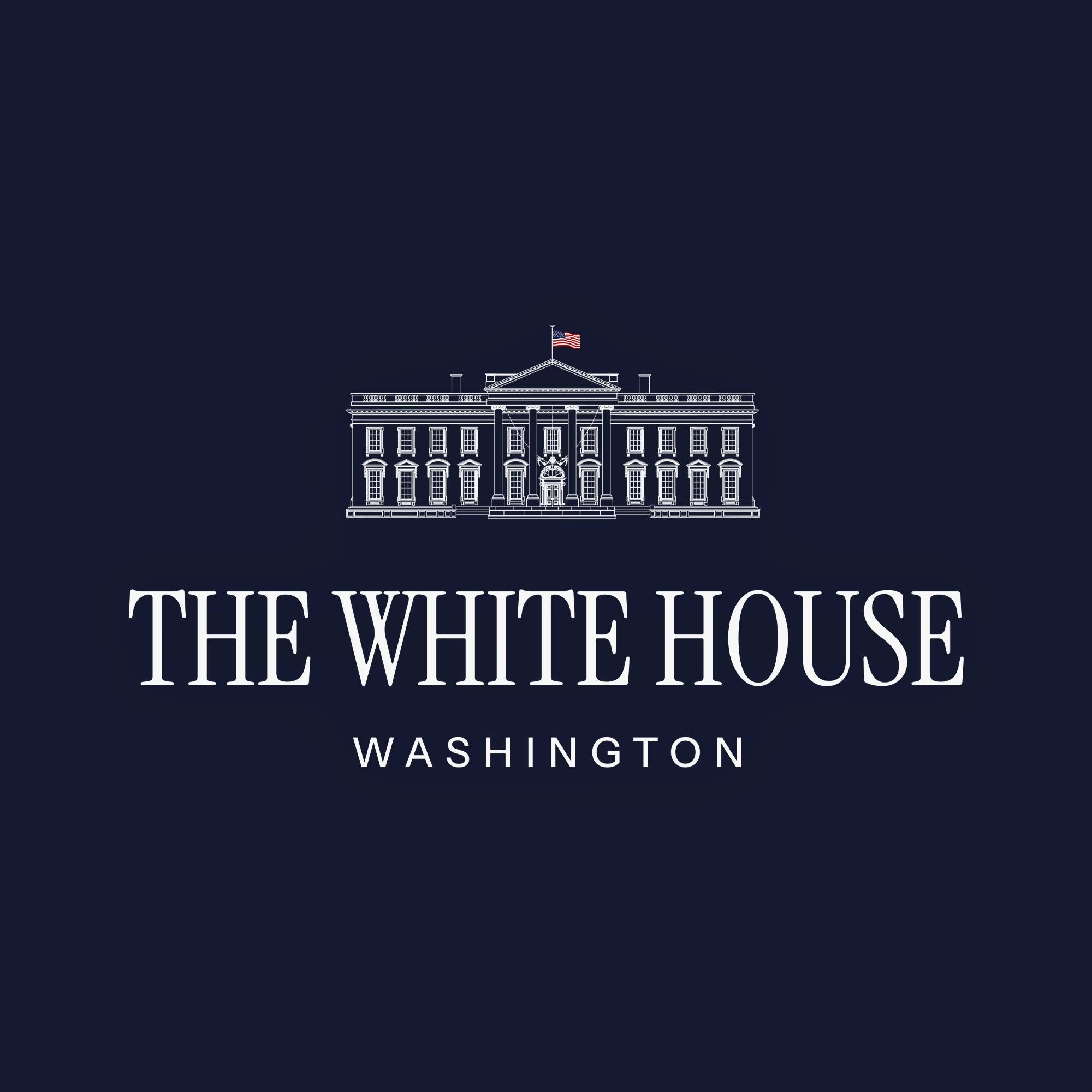
- Incumbent; Vacant since January 20, 2025
- Executive Office of the President; White House Office
- Appointer: Donald Trump; as President of the United States
- Formation: October 2, 1901; 125 years ago
- First holder: Belle Hagner
- Website: The White House

The White House social secretary is responsible for the planning, coordination, and execution of official social events at the White House, the official residence and principal workplace of the president of the United States.

== Function ==
The social secretary is head of the White House Social Office, located in the East Wing of the White House Complex. The social secretary plans events ranging from those as simple as a tea for the first lady and a single official guest to dinners for more than 200 guests.

The social secretary works with the White House chief usher to coordinate domestic staff and with the chief of protocol of the United States, an official within the United States Department of State, to plan state visits and accompanying state dinners. The social secretary works with the White House Graphics and Calligraphy Office in the production of invitations to social events.

The social secretary works on both the political and non-political functions of the presidency, coordinating events for the president, the first lady, and senior political staff. The White House social secretary serves at the president's pleasure and is appointed by each administration.

== Notable office-holders ==
On February 25, 2011, the White House appointed Jeremy Bernard, the first male, and first openly gay, social secretary in that position's history. "I have long admired the arts and education programs that have become hallmarks of the Obama White House and I am eager to continue these efforts in the years ahead," Bernard said during the announcing press conference.

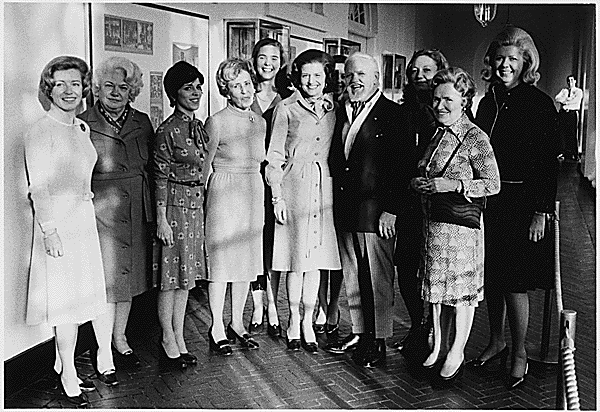
Betty Ford with former Social Secretaries, 1975

== List of White House social secretaries ==
No.	Image	Social Secretary	Term of office	President
1		Belle Hagner	1901–1909	Theodore Roosevelt
2		Alice Blech	1909–1910	William Howard Taft
3		Mary Spiers	1910–1913	William Howard Taft
4		Belle Hagner	1913–1915	Woodrow Wilson
5		Edith Benham Helm	1915–1921	Woodrow Wilson
6		Laura Harlan	1921–1923	Warren G. Harding
6		Laura Harlan	1923–1929	Calvin Coolidge
7		Mary Randolph	1929–1931	Herbert Hoover
8		Doris Goss	1931–1933	Herbert Hoover
9		Edith Benham Helm	1933–1945	Franklin D. Roosevelt
9		Edith Benham Helm	1945–1953	Harry S. Truman
10		Mary Jane McCaffree	1955–1961	Dwight D. Eisenhower
11		Letitia Baldrige	1961–1963	John F. Kennedy
12		Nancy Tuckerman	1963–1963	John F. Kennedy
13		Bess Abell	1963–1969	Lyndon B. Johnson
14		Lucy Winchester	1969–1974	Richard Nixon
15		Nancy Lammerding Ruwe	1974–1975	Gerald Ford
16		Maria Downs	1975–1977	Gerald Ford
17		Gretchen Poston	1977–1981	Jimmy Carter
18		Mabel (Muffie) Brandon	1981–1983	Ronald Reagan
19		Gahl Hodges	1983–1985	Ronald Reagan
20		Linda Faulkner	1985–1989	Ronald Reagan
21		Laurie Firestone	1989–1993	George H. W. Bush
22		Ann Stock	1993–1997	Bill Clinton
23		Capricia Marshall	1997–2001	Bill Clinton
24		Catherine Fenton	2001–2004	George W. Bush
25		Lea Berman	2004–2007	George W. Bush
26		Amy Zantzinger	2007–2009	George W. Bush
27		Desirée Rogers	2009–2010	Barack Obama
28		Julianna Smoot	2010–2011	Barack Obama
29		Jeremy Bernard	2011–2015	Barack Obama
30		Deesha Dyer	2015–2017	Barack Obama
31		Anna Cristina Niceta Lloyd	2017–2021	Donald Trump
32		Carlos Elizondo	2021–2025	Joe Biden
