= Bess Abell =

American presidential aide (1933–2020)

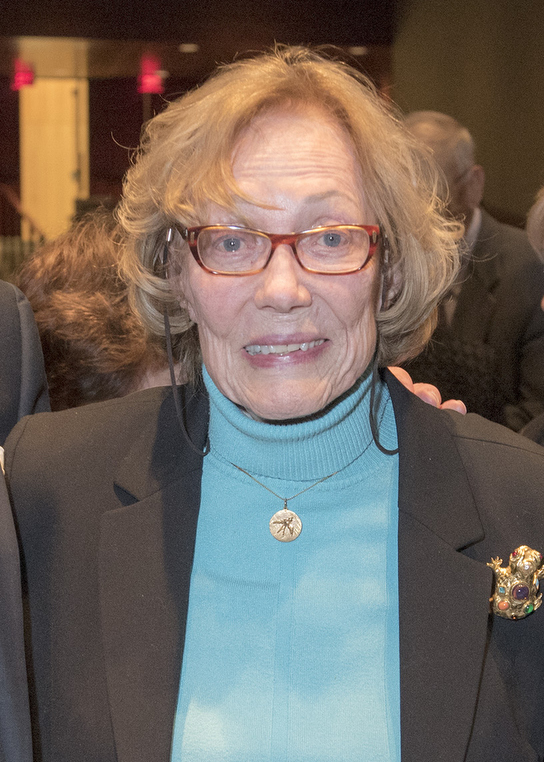
- Abell in 2017
- Born: Elizabeth Hughes Clements; June 2, 1933; Evansville, Indiana, U.S.
- Died: October 9, 2020 (aged 87); Potomac, Maryland, U.S.

Elizabeth "Bess" Hughes Abell (née Clements; June 2, 1933 – October 9, 2020) was an American presidential aide. She was the White House social secretary in the Lyndon B. Johnson administration. She later worked in public relations and then as executive assistant to Second Lady of the United States Joan Mondale.

== Early life ==
Abell was born on June 2, 1933, in Evansville, Indiana, and grew up in Morganfield, Kentucky. Her father, Earle Clements, was a member of the House of Representatives, governor of Kentucky and a United States senator. Her mother Sara (Blue) Clements was their town's postmaster. Clements went to boarding school in Nashville, Tennessee, then attended the University of Kentucky. She majored in political science, graduating in 1954. She eloped that year with attorney Tyler Abell. The Abells had two sons, Dan and Lyndon.

== Career ==
In 1960, Abell volunteered to work for the Democratic Campaign Committee, where she answered mail for Lady Bird Johnson. When Lyndon B. Johnson was elected vice president, Abell became a part-time secretary to Mrs. Johnson.

Lady Bird Johnson appointed Abell as White House Social Secretary, and Liz Carpenter as press secretary. They became her principal aides and during the 1964 presidential campaign they organized the "Lady Bird Special," a train tour through the Southern states, where many voters had been alienated by passage of the Civil Rights Act.

The Johnsons regularly entertained both large and small groups, and Abell took charge of everything from the invitations to the seating, and entertaining of the guests. She also helped organize the weddings of the Johnsons' daughters, Luci and Lynda in 1966 and 1967. A combination of Southern charm and steely determination in these endeavors earned her the Secret Service handle of "Iron Butterfly."

When planning a White House Festival of the Arts in 1965, Abell preferred to invite artists and performers, but she clashed with the historian Eric F. Goldman, who as special assistant to the president included poets, novelists, and other writers. As she feared, some of them used the White House as a platform to protest U.S. foreign policy. As the Vietnam War escalated, Abell did her best to maintain tranquility within the White House by limiting entertainers to those who had not signed petitions against the war.

After the Johnson administration, she launched Bess Abell Enterprises, a public relations venture to plan events. Her clients ranged from politicians to publishers and journalists. In 1974 she helped organize a Counter-Gridiron party to support women journalists, who had been excluded from the Gridiron Club, which annually entertained Washington's political elite. The success of that event finally convinced the Gridiron Club to admit women members in 1975.

From 1977 to 1981, Abell served as executive assistant to Joan Mondale, helping the Mondales become the first vice-presidential family to occupy their official residence. She aided Joan Mondale's efforts to promote American art.

In later years, Abell worked with her husband to develop Merry-Go-Round Farm in Potomac, Maryland, as a horse farm and residential community, while providing advice to her successors as White House Social Secretary.

== Death and legacy ==
Bess Abell died on October 9, 2020, of complications from Alzheimer's disease at her home in Potomac, Maryland.

She had served as a member of the National Archives Foundation and the University of Kentucky Libraries National Advisory Board. Abell and her husband established the Earle C. Clements memorial endowment at UK Libraries.
