= Dobelle =

Dobelle is a surname. Notable people with the surname include:

- Edith H. J. Dobelle (born 1944), American government official
- Evan Dobelle (born 1945), American public official and higher education administrator
- Martin Dobelle (1906–1986), American surgeon
- William H. Dobelle (1941–2004), biomedical researcher
