= Hunter Reno =

American television personality (born 1968)

- Born: Karin Hunter Reno; 1968 (age 57–58); Miami, Florida, U.S.
- Occupations: Television personality; model
- Years active: 1983–2009
- Spouse(s): Peter Rabbino (m. 2001, divorced) Katie Meier (m. 2022)
- Children: 2
- Relatives: Janet Reno (aunt); Maggy Hurchalla (aunt)

Karin Hunter Reno (born 1968) is an American former television personality and model. She hosted various TV series in the 1990s and 2000s, including the Travel Channel's Exotic Islands and WPBT's Wild Florida.

== Early life ==
Reno was born and raised in Miami, Florida. Her mother, Donna, was a nurse, originally from Seville, and her father, Mark (1941–2014), had varied jobs including carpenter, game warden, and tugboat captain. Her parents divorced when she was young. Her father's sisters were United States Attorney General Janet Reno and environmental activist Maggy Hurchalla.

Reno enjoyed the outdoors growing up and often went camping and sailed to the Bahamas with her family. A tomboy, she played softball, basketball, volleyball, and soccer, and water skied. She graduated from Southwest Miami High School in 1986. She briefly attended George Washington University in 1995, but dropped out after one semester.

== Career ==
Reno began modeling with local agency Michele Pommier Models in Miami. She began working with Elite Model Management in New York City at age 13; at 15 in 1983, she placed third in their inaugural Look of the Year modeling contest. With the result, she earned a two-year contract worth US$100,000 (equivalent to $323,254 in 2025), becoming one of the agency's youngest professional models. She moved into their 54th Street condominium in New York and crossed the globe for photo shoots, appearing on the covers of magazines such as Vogue France, Elle International, and Vogue España. After a whirlwind nine months, she decided to return to Florida for her junior year at Southwest Miami High School; while in New York, she attended the Professional Children's School.

Reno resumed modeling after graduating from high school. Listed at 6 feet (1.8 m) and 145 pounds (66 kg), she was described as having a strong and athletic look. Magazine covers where she appeared included Vogue, Shape, Mirabella, Mademoiselle, Fitness, Town & Country, and New Woman. In 1995, she became the face for a L'Oréal hair care campaign. She retired from full-time modeling at age 29.

In 1996, Reno began hosting the Travel Channel series Exotic Islands, where she presented about the culture and environment of islands around the world. She traveled to 75 islands and created 56 episodes of the show. She later became the host of WAMI's Ocean Drive with Hunter Reno and co-hosted WPBT's magazine show New Florida. She also worked for Oxygen's Oxygen Sports (focusing on women's sports), HBO's HBO Entertainment News, and behind the scenes for ABC's Primetime Live and World News Tonight. In 2006, she began hosting WPBT's Wild Florida about the environment of the state.

== Personal life ==
Reno began dating tennis player Martina Navratilova in 1996. They separated the following year. She married Peter Rabbino in Coral Gables, Florida, on December 9, 2001. The wedding was officiated by her aunt Janet Reno, then running for Governor of Florida. She worked in her aunt's campaign along with other family members. Reno and Rabbino had two daughters and later divorced. She married basketball coach Katie Meier in Key Largo on May 28, 2022.
