= George Bush Center for Intelligence =

CIA headquarters in Langley, Virginia, U.S.

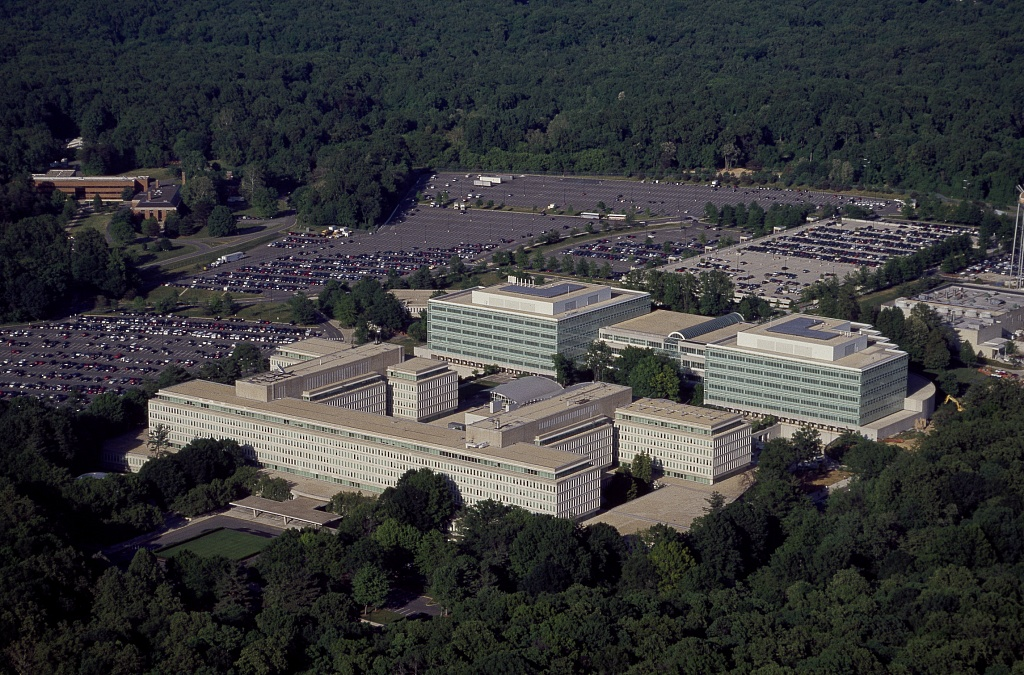
- An aerial view of the George Bush Center for Intelligence

General information
- Status: Completed
- Location: 1000 Colonial Farm Road, Langley, Virginia, United States
- Coordinates: 38°57′6.12″N 77°8′48.12″W
- Current tenants: Central Intelligence Agency
- Named for: George H. W. Bush
- Construction started: October 1957; 69 years ago
- Topped-out: 1960; 66 years ago
- Opened: September 1961; 65 years ago (Original HQ Building)
- Inaugurated: November 28, 1961; 64 years ago
- Renovated: May 1984 – March 1991 (New HQ Building)
- Cost: $46 million

Technical details
- Floor count: Six (New Headquarters Building); Seven (Original Headquarters Building)
- Floor area: 2,500,000 sq ft (230,000 m^{2})
- Grounds: 258 acres (104 hectares)

Design and construction
- Architecture firm: Harrison & Abramovitz

Renovating team
- Architect: Smith, Hinchman and Grylls Associates

The George Bush Center for Intelligence is the headquarters of the Central Intelligence Agency (CIA), located in the unincorporated community of Langley in Fairfax County, Virginia, United States, near Washington, D.C.

The headquarters is a conglomeration of the Original Headquarters Building (OHB) and the New Headquarters Building (NHB) and sits on a total of 258 acres (1.04 km^{2}) of land. It was the world's largest intelligence headquarters from 1959 until 2019, when it was surpassed by Germany's BND headquarters.

== Name ==
Before its current name, the CIA headquarters was formally unnamed. On April 26, 1999, the complex was officially named in the Intelligence Authorization Act for Fiscal Year 1999 for George H. W. Bush, who had served as the director of central intelligence for 357 days (between January 30, 1976, and January 20, 1977) and later as the 41st president of the United States.

Colloquially, it is known by the metonym Langley. "The Farm" is not a reference to the center despite its address, but to the CIA training facility at Camp Peary.

== History ==
The Original Headquarters Building was designed by the New York firm Harrison & Abramovitz in the 1950s and contains 1,400,000 square feet (130,000 m^{2}) of floor space. The ground was broken for construction on November 3, 1959, with President Dwight D. Eisenhower laying the cornerstone; the building was completed in March 1961. It included a pneumatic tube system manufactured by Lamson Corporation of Syracuse, New York. Though the system was replaced by email and shut down in 1989, the thirty miles (50 km) of steel tubes remain in the building. At the request of Allen Dulles, a marble wall in the Old Headquarters Building bears an engraving of the Biblical slogan "And ye shall know the truth and the truth shall make you free."

The New Headquarters Building, designed by Smith, Hinchman and Grylls Associates, was completed in March 1991 after the ground was broken for construction on May 24, 1984. It is a complex that adjoins two six-story office towers and is fully connected via a tunnel to the OHB.

On January 25, 1993, Mir Qazi, a Pakistani resident of the United States, killed two CIA employees and wounded three others on the road to the CIA headquarters, claiming that it was revenge for the U.S. government's policy in the Middle East, "particularly toward the Palestinian people". Qazi was sentenced to death for the shooting and executed in 2002.

On May 3, 2021, an armed 31-year-old man from Jasper, Indiana, tried to drive into the center and was shot following a standoff that lasted several hours. He died the following day.

== Location and facilities ==
The center is located at 1000 Colonial Farm Road in McLean, Virginia, and can be reached via George Washington Memorial Parkway. The complex may only be accessed by those with authorization (appropriate credentials) or by appointment; only authorized vehicles may access the private road leading to the complex from George Washington Memorial Parkway.

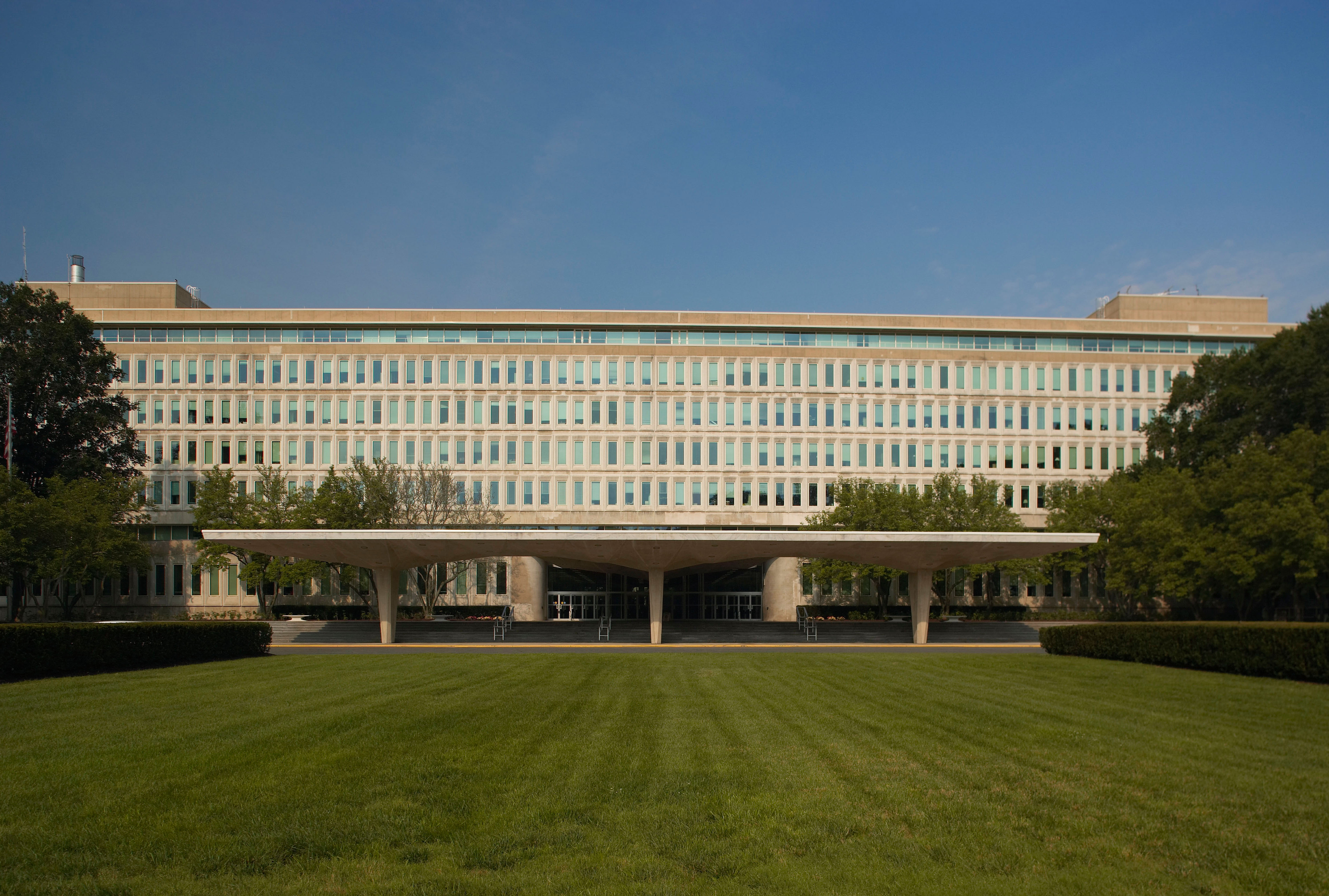
The Original Headquarters Building which was designed in the mid-1950s following the vision of former director of central intelligence Allen Dulles, who dreamed of a place where intelligence officers could work in a college campus-like atmosphere

A notable exception to the strict protocols for accessing the center was Russell Weston Jr.'s visit in July 1996. Weston, a paranoid schizophrenic man from Montana, drove cross country from his home to the center, where at the gate he claimed his code-name was "The Moon" and that he had important information for the director of central intelligence (at the time, John M. Deutch). Weston was then allowed access to the facility, where he was interviewed for approximately one hour by an anonymous CIA officer and then sent on his way. Two years later, Weston would become the perpetrator of the 1998 United States Capitol shooting, in which two Capitol Police officers were murdered.

The location of the building has led to the name "Langley" being used as a colloquial metonym for the CIA headquarters, despite the presence of other non-CIA-related government buildings in the community of Langley, such as the Turner-Fairbank Highway Research Center. This is similar to how "Foggy Bottom" is colloquially used to identify the headquarters of the United States Department of State, despite the name also being used to refer to the neighborhood of D.C. in which the building is located.

The CIA Museum (also known as the National History Collection or National Intelligence Council (NIC) Collection) is located within the center. The museum holds declassified items such as artifacts associated with the CIA, the Office of Strategic Services and foreign intelligence organizations, including historical spy gadgets and weapons, and photographs. As it is located within the CIA compound, it is not accessible by the general public. An Enigma machine and Osama bin Laden's AKMS are held in the museum.

There is a Starbucks coffee shop located on the site of the CIA headquarters. It is notably secretive and the baristas are not allowed to ask for customers' names.

Kryptos is a notable encrypted sculpture that sits on the grounds of the CIA's headquarters.

In a nod to American covert intelligence-gathering activities from an earlier era, a statue of Nathan Hale, the captured colonial spy hanged by the British during the American Revolution, stands on the grounds of the CIA headquarters complex. The CIA headquarters features a bronze statue of Harriet Tubman, whom it calls a model spy. "She exemplifies how we need a diverse cadre of officers to do our mission here at CIA," said a CIA employee on the CIA's podcast, The Langley Files.

== See also ==
- Defense Intelligence Agency Headquarters
