= Martin Dobelle =

American orthopedic surgeon

- Born: December 25, 1906; New York City, United States
- Died: August 11, 1986 (aged 79); New York City, United States
- Education: Fordham University, University of Ghent, Washington University in St. Louis
- Spouse: Lillian Mendelsohn (1936-her death)
- Children: William H. Dobelle, Evan Dobelle
- Relatives: Edith H. J. Dobelle (daughter-in-law)

Martin Dobelle (December 25, 1906 - August 11, 1986) was an American orthopedic surgeon and medical examiner, based in Massachusetts.

== Early life and education ==
Dobelle was born in New York City and raised in Brooklyn, the son of Harry and Ida Kaplan Dobelle. He attended Boys High School, and received a track and field scholarship to and graduated from Fordham University in 1926 where he was a member of Phi Beta Kappa. After working in a Brooklyn pharmacy for two years, he studied medicine at the University of Ghent in Belgium, where he received his medical degree in 1934. He served internships and residencies at various American hospitals, including Boston City Hospital, and held teaching fellowships at both Tufts University and Harvard University.

== Career ==
Dobelle opened a practice in Pittsfield, Massachusetts, in 1939. In 1943 he closed his private practice and entered the Army. He reached the rank of lieutenant colonel. He was chief of orthopedic surgery at the Army hospital in Fort Belvoir, Virginia, and chief of surgery service at Halloran General Hospital in Staten Island. He was cited for meritorious performance while at Fort Belvoir, where he reorganized the orthopedic section and set up a teaching program, and was decorated three times for surgical accomplishment.

Dobelle returned to Pittsfield in 1947. He was chief of surgery at the Carrie Tingley Crippled Children's Hospital for Indian Children in Hot Springs, New Mexico, and consulting orthopedic surgeon for Kaiser Permanente Foundation Hospital in Honolulu, Hawaii. He also served as chief orthopedic surgeon at the Cape Kennedy Missile Center in Florida for three years during Project Mercury and was consultant in orthopedic surgery to the Air Force Military Support Facility at Patrick Air Force Base.

He returned to Pittsfield in 1965 and two years later was appointed medical examiner for central Berkshire, a post he held until 1982. He was also a five-year member of the state Board of Registration in Nursing. Dobelle was president of the Nicholas Andre Orthopedic Society, a diplomate of the American Board of Orthopedists, a fellow of the New York Academy of Medicine, and a founding fellow of the International College of Surgeons, as well as a member of the American Medical Association and Massachusetts and Berkshire medical societies. He retired in 1975.

== Personal life ==
Dobelle married educator Lillian Mendelsohn Dobelle in 1936, and had two sons, William H. Dobelle and Evan Dobelle. His wife died in 1979. He died in 1986, at the age of 79, in New York City.
