= Janet Reno =

American lawyer and public official (1938–2016)

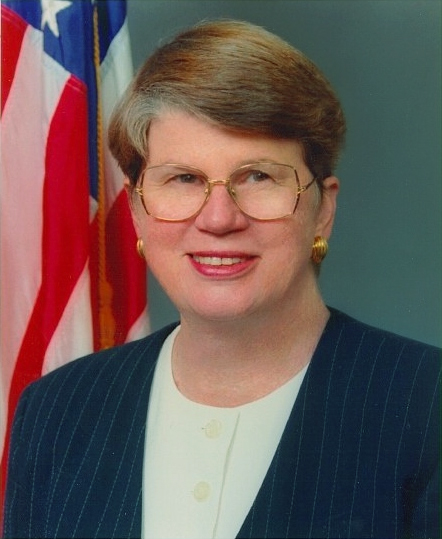
- Official portrait, c. 1990s

78th United States Attorney General
- In office March 12, 1993 – January 20, 2001
- President: Bill Clinton
- Deputy: Philip Heymann; Jamie Gorelick; Eric Holder
- Preceded by: William Barr
- Succeeded by: John Ashcroft

State Attorney for Miami-Dade County, Florida
- In office 1978–1993
- Preceded by: Richard Gerstein
- Succeeded by: Katherine Fernandez Rundle

Personal details
- Born: Janet Wood Reno; July 21, 1938 Miami, Florida, U.S.
- Died: November 7, 2016 (aged 78) Miami, Florida, U.S.
- Party: Democratic
- Education: Cornell University (BA); Harvard University (JD)
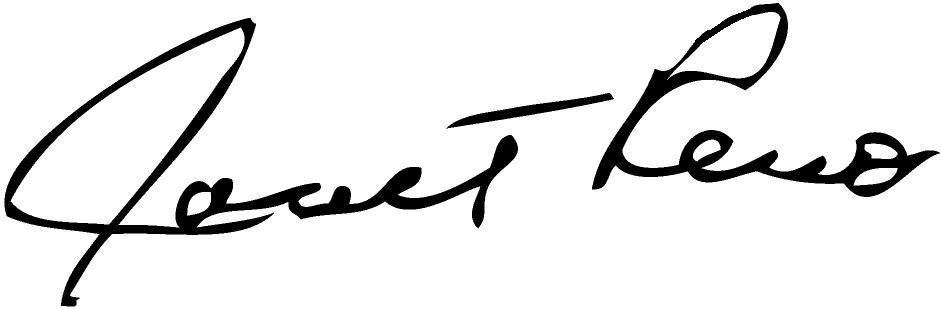
- Signature

Janet Wood Reno (July 21, 1938 – November 7, 2016) was an American lawyer and public official who served as the 78th United States attorney general from 1993 to 2001 under President Bill Clinton. A member of the Democratic Party, Reno was the second-longest serving attorney general, behind only William Wirt, and the first woman to serve in the position.

Reno was born and raised in Miami, Florida. After leaving to attend Cornell University and Harvard Law School, she returned to Miami where she started her career at private law firms. Her first foray into government was as a staff member for the Judiciary Committee of the Florida House of Representatives. She then worked for the Dade County State Attorney's Office before returning to private practice. She was elected to the Office of State Attorney five times and was the first woman to serve as a state attorney in Florida. President Bill Clinton appointed her attorney general in 1993, a position she held until Clinton left office in 2001.

== Early life and education ==
Reno was born in Miami, Florida. Reno's mother, Jane Wallace (née Wood), wrote a weekly home improvement column for The Miami News under a male pseudonym and later became an investigative reporter for the paper. Janet's father, Henry Olaf Reno (né Rasmussen), (Note: Henry's father decided to change the family's Scandinavian name to avoid prejudice and settled on "Reno" after looking at a map of the United States.) was an emigrant from Denmark and a reporter for the Miami Herald for 43 years. Janet Reno had three younger siblings: Mark, writer Robert Reno, and Maggy Hurchalla. In 1943, the Reno family moved to a house in then-rural South Miami; it came with enough land to keep farm animals, including cows, chicken, ducks, goats, and turkeys. Reno helped her parents churn butter, which the family sold to make ends meet.

As the family expanded, they outgrew the house and couldn't afford a larger one. Jane Reno decided to build a new home herself near the Everglades, learning masonry, electrical work, and plumbing for the task. The Reno family moved to the house Jane built when Janet was 8 years old. The house would be Reno's lifelong home and a source of inspiration; she later said, "the house is a symbol to me that you can do anything you really want if it's the right thing to do and you put your mind to it." The Renos' lot for the house originally was 21 acres, some of which they later sold to pay for the children's education.

Reno attended public school in Miami-Dade County, Florida. After she completed middle school in 1951, Reno's parents sent her to stay with her uncle who served as a U.S. military judge in Regensburg, Germany. There, Janet continued her education and traveled around Europe during breaks from school. After a year, Reno returned to Florida where she was a debating champion and salutatorian at Coral Gables Senior High School. In 1956 she enrolled at Cornell University, where she majored in chemistry, became president of the Women's Self-Government Association, and earned her room and board. After graduating from Cornell, Reno enrolled at Harvard Law School, one of 16 women in a class of 500 students. She graduated from Harvard in 1963.

== Early career ==
From 1963 to 1971, Reno worked as an attorney for two Miami law firms. In 1971, she joined the staff of the Judiciary Committee of the Florida House of Representatives. The following year, Reno unsuccessfully ran for a seat in Florida's state house. In 1973, she worked on a project to revise the state's system of rules and regulations for criminal procedures. Later in the same year, she accepted a position with the Dade County State Attorney's Office led by Richard Gerstein. Shortly after joining the office, Gerstein made Reno his chief assistant. Reno did not try any cases during her time working for Gerstein. She worked for the Judiciary Circuit, and left the state attorney's office in 1976 to become a partner in a private law firm, Steel, Hector & Davis. Gerstein decided to retire in 1977, creating a vacancy with Florida governor Reubin Askew to appoint a successor. Reno was one of two candidates Gerstein recommended to replace him.

=== State Attorney ===
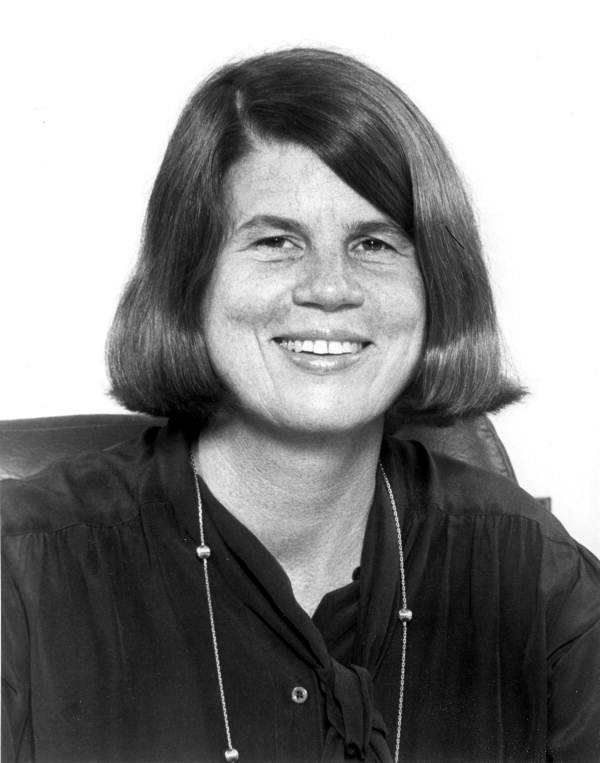
Portrait of Florida's first woman State Attorney Janet Reno in 1978.

In January 1978, Governor Askew appointed Reno the State Attorney for Dade County (now called Miami-Dade County). She was the first woman to serve as a state attorney in Florida. She was elected to the Office of State Attorney in November 1978 and was returned to office by the voters four more times. Reno ran as a liberal, pro-choice Democrat even though Miami-Dade was a conservative county. Reno did not always face serious challengers, although in 1984 Cuban-American lawyer Jose Garcia-Pedrosa ran against Reno, and picked up the endorsement of the Miami Herald editorial board. In spite of his support among Miami's Hispanic voters, Reno won the election decisively.

The office she led included 95 attorneys and an annual caseload that included 15,000 felonies and 40,000 misdemeanors. As state attorney, she developed a reputation for ethical behavior, going so far as to purchase a car at sticker price to avoid the appearance of impropriety.

==== Drug court ====
She established a drug court which was later replicated in other parts of the country. She worked actively in various civic organizations, including the Miami Coalition for a Safe and Drug Free Community and the Beacon Council, which was formed to address Miami-Dade's economic development.

==== McDuffie trial ====
In May 1980, Reno prosecuted five white policemen who were accused of beating a black insurance salesman, Arthur McDuffie, to death. The policemen were all acquitted. During the resulting 1980 Miami riots, eighteen people were killed, with looters in Liberty City angrily chanting "Reno! Reno! Reno!" Reno met with nearly all of her critics, and a few months later, she won reelection in a landslide.

==== Child abuse prosecutions ====
During Reno's tenure as state attorney, she began what the PBS series Frontline described as a "crusade" against accused child abusers. Reno pioneered the "Miami Method", "a controversial technique for eliciting intimate details from young children and inspired passage of a law allowing them to testify by closed-circuit television, out of the possibly intimidating presence of their suspected molesters." Bobby Fijnje, "a 14-year-old boy, was acquitted after his attorneys discredited the children's persistent interrogations by a psychologist who called herself the 'yucky secrets doctor'." Grant Snowden was acquitted, retried, convicted, and eventually freed by a federal appeals court after 12 years in prison."

Reno's "model case" was against Frank Fuster, co-owner of the Country Walk Babysitting Service in a suburb of Miami, Florida. In 1984, he was found guilty of 14 counts of abuse and sentenced to prison with a minimum of 165 years. Fuster was convicted based in large part on the testimony of his 18-year-old wife, Ileana Flores, who pleaded guilty and testified against him, after allegedly being tortured. In a 2002 episode of Frontline, Flores maintained that she and her ex-husband were innocent, and that Reno personally pressured her to confess. The number and timing of Reno's visits are in dispute. As of 2020, Fuster remains imprisoned.

In 1989, as Florida state attorney, Reno pressed adult charges against 13-year-old Bobby Fijnje, who was accused of sexually molesting 21 children in his care during church services. The charges were driven by the testimony of children interviewed by mental-health professionals using techniques later discredited. Fijnje refused plea-bargain offers. During the trial, the prosecution was unable to present any witnesses to the alleged abuse. After two years of investigation and trial, Fijnje was acquitted of all charges.

When Reno was nominated for attorney general in the Clinton administration, the Nation and Miami New Times raised questions about her handling of these cases, Debbie Nathan's journal article was faxed to the White House, and Fijnje's father (a Dutch diplomat) "sent a letter to the Senate Judiciary Committee". However, Reno was not directly questioned about them. When she was asked in 2002, Reno said that she lacked the time to review the Country Walk case files.

==== Death penalty ====
Although Reno personally opposed the death penalty, her office secured 80 capital punishment convictions during her tenure. None of these were executed during her tenure, but five were later executed.

== U.S. Attorney General ==
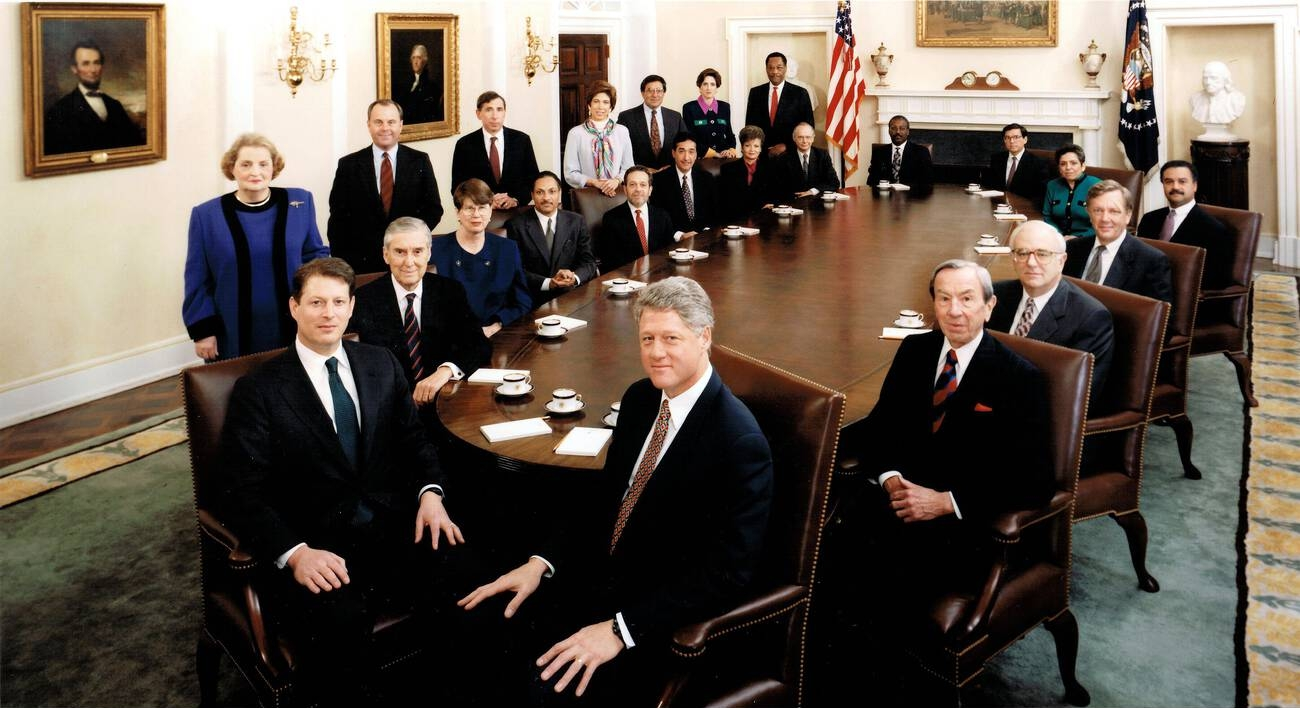
President Clinton's Cabinet, 1993. The President is seated front right, with Vice President Al Gore seated front left.

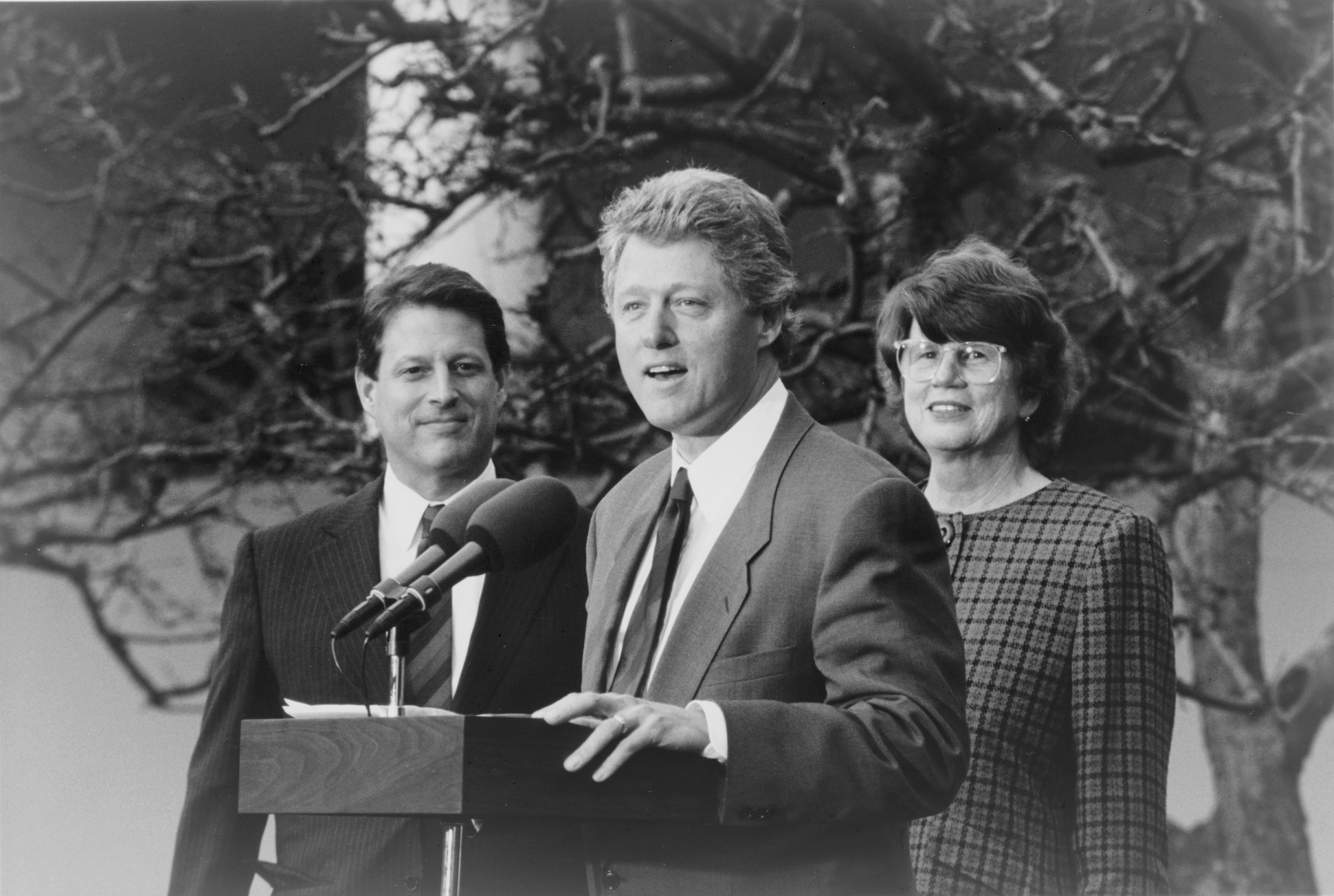
Reno in the White House Rose Garden with Vice President Gore and President Clinton

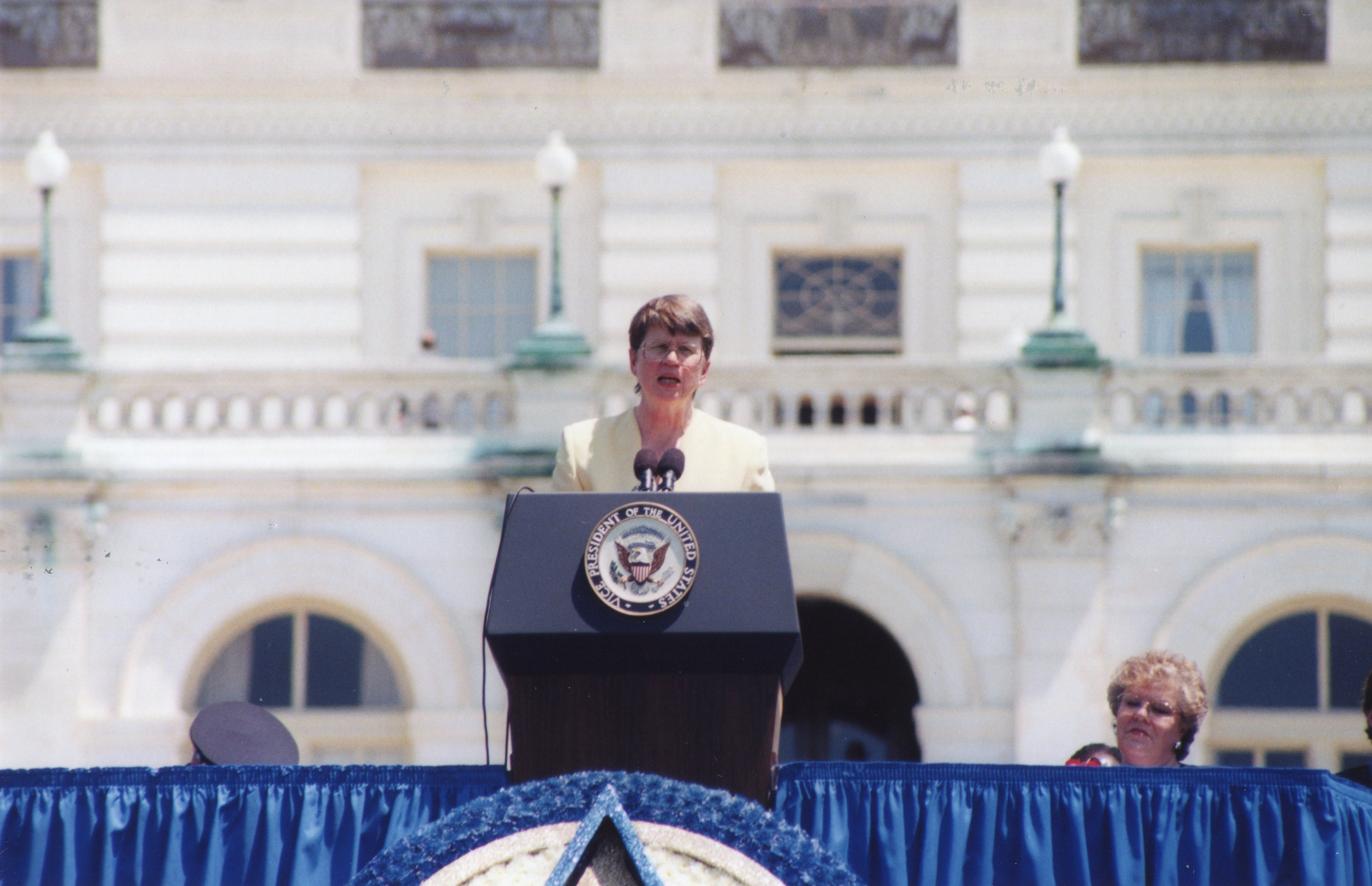
Reno speaking at the 1998 National Peace Officers' Memorial Service

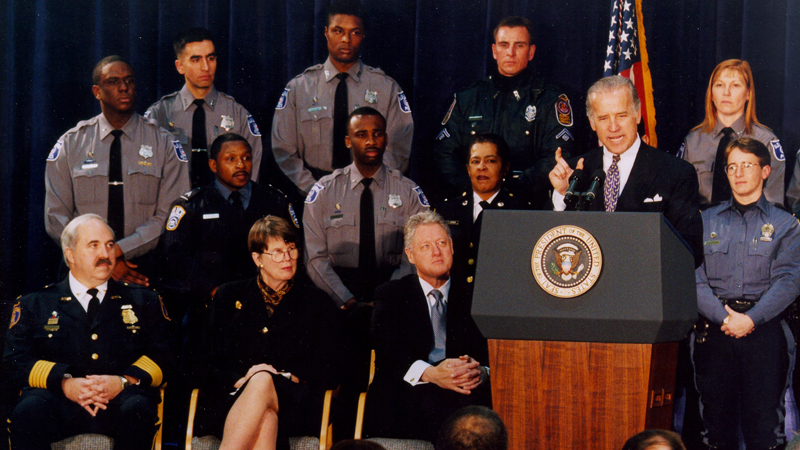
Reno looks on as Sen. Joe Biden speaks at the signing of the 1994 Crime Bill

President-elect Bill Clinton had vowed to assemble an administration that "looked like America", and it was widely assumed that one of the major cabinet posts would go to a woman. On February 11, 1993, Clinton introduced Reno as his nominee for United States Attorney General, stating that he wanted to hire a woman for the job but had also considered multiple male candidates. Both of his previous choices, Zoë Baird and Kimba Wood, faced problems because both had employed undocumented immigrants as nannies. Clinton said he had discounted Reno early in his search because she did not have experience in the Justice Department or federal law, but ultimately he came to understand that she had experience with a variety of criminal law issues from her role as State Attorney. On March 11, 1993, the Senate confirmed Reno by a vote of 98 to 0. She was sworn in the next day, becoming the first woman to serve as U.S. Attorney General. As Attorney General, Reno oversaw the Justice Department and its 95,000 employees. Reno remained Attorney General for the rest of Clinton's presidency, making her the longest-serving Attorney General since William Wirt in 1829.

In 1994, Reno tasked the Justice Department with compiling a report on DNA exoneration. The science was still new at that point in time. Reno commissioned the report after reading about the exoneration of a death row inmate. She wanted to know how many cases existed like the one she read about and what the Department of Justice could learn from it. The resulting report concluded there was a strong possibility that many more wrongful convictions that could be cleared with DNA evidence existed. Reno changed policies on how to interview eyewitnesses and laboratory protocols in response.

The following Department of Justice actions occurred during Reno's tenure:

- The 51-day Waco siege standoff and resulting 76 deaths—the Branch Davidians—in Waco, Texas. (The standoff began on February 28, 1993, twelve days before Reno was installed as attorney general). Reno stated in congressional testimony that she authorized the FBI assault on the Branch Davidians because of reports that militia groups were en route to Waco during the standoff "either to help [Branch Davidian leader David] Koresh or to attack him." The FBI had also, erroneously, reported to Reno that children were being abused at the compound. Reno publicly expressed her regret of the decision to storm the compound, and accepted full responsibility for the loss of life.
- The antitrust division brought suit against the software company Microsoft for violation of the Sherman Antitrust Act. The Justice Department alleged that Microsoft was bundling its browser with its operating system to decrease competition from other browser makers. Microsoft executive Steve Ballmer responded to the suit saying "To Heck with Janet Reno", a comment for which he later expressed regret. The case was ultimately settled in 2001, after Reno's departure.
- Declining to question anyone in the Wenatchee child abuse prosecutions, with Reno concluding there was no "evidence of prosecutable violations of federal civil rights law".
- Prosecution resulting in the conviction of 21 of the Montana Freemen, a group that did not believe there should be government above the county level, after an 81-day armed standoff which ended without loss of life. In March 1996, Montana Freemen began a 61-day standoff with the FBI after the FBI arrested three members of the group for refusing to leave property from which they had been evicted. Following the tragedy at Waco, the FBI was determined to avoid violence, and Reno assured the public that the FBI was looking for a peaceful solution to the standoff.
- Capture and conviction of Ted Kaczynski, the Unabomber.
- Capture and conviction of Timothy McVeigh and Terry Nichols for the Oklahoma City bombing.
- Capture and conviction of those who conducted the 1993 World Trade Center bombing, resulting in life-sentences of Sheik Omar Abdel-Rahman and four conspirators.
- Leak to the news media regarding Richard Jewell that led to the widespread and incorrect presumption of his guilt in the Centennial Olympic Park bombing. She later apologized, saying "I'm very sorry it happened. I think we owe him an apology. I regret the leak."
- The government's unsuccessful defense of the Communications Decency Act, which culminated in the Supreme Court decision Reno v. American Civil Liberties Union.
- Identification of the correct suspect (Eric Rudolph) in the Centennial Olympic Park bombing and other bombings, who remained a fugitive throughout her tenure. Rudolph was apprehended in 2003 and pleaded guilty to the attacks.
- Capture and conviction of Mir Qazi for the 1993 shootings at CIA Headquarters.
- The armed seizure of six-year-old Elián González and his return to his father, who eventually took him home to Cuba; Elián's mother and stepfather had died in a dangerous trip by sea, and though his U.S. relatives had lost custody to his father in court, local officials did not enforce the ruling. Reno made the decision to remove Elián González from the house of a relative and return him to his father in Cuba.

=== Clinton administration investigations ===
In 1994, Reno appointed Robert Fiske special counsel to investigate Bill Clinton's involvement in Whitewater, a controversy stemming from Clinton's business dealings during his time as Governor of Arkansas. Fiske wrapped up his criminal investigation within six months, and found no link between Whitewater and the suicide of former Deputy White House Counsel Vince Foster. Congress reauthorized the investigation and in August 1994, a panel of judges from the U.S. Court of Appeals overseeing the special counsel refused to reappoint Fiske. The panel considered it a conflict of interest for Fiske to investigate Clinton because Reno, a member of the Clinton Administration, appointed Fiske. Instead, the panel appointed former member of the Reagan and Bush Administrations Ken Starr to continue the Whitewater investigation. Starr concluded the Whitewater investigation in December 1997 due to insufficient evidence. The following month, Starr received permission from Reno to redirect his probe into conduct related to the Paula Jones and Monica Lewinsky affairs. Starr's Report, issued in September 1998, listed eleven grounds for impeachment against Clinton.

In 1998, the House Government Reform and Oversight Committee, in a party line vote, voted to recommend the House cite Reno for contempt of Congress for not turning over two internal Justice Department memos related to a campaign finance controversy during the impeachment of President Bill Clinton. Reno contended she refused to turn over the documents sought because the documents would reveal prosecutor strategy in an ongoing investigation. Reno argued that her actions were in defense of the principle that prosecutors should be free of political influence. The full House of Representatives never voted on the resolution and the documents were turned over to the House.

== Later career ==
Reno ran for Governor of Florida in 2002, but lost in the Democratic primary to Bill McBride 44% to 44.4%. Voting problems arose in the election, and she did not concede defeat until a week later.

After her tenure as United States Attorney General and her unsuccessful gubernatorial bid, Reno toured the country giving speeches on topics relating to the criminal justice system. On March 31, 2006, she spoke at a criminology conference at the University of Pennsylvania. She stated that she believed the education system in the United States needs to be improved, as there is a link between the quality of education and the crime rate. She also believed that too much money has been diverted away from the juvenile court system and that the government should find some way to make the juvenile courts work effectively, so as to prevent problems in troubled children and adolescents before these problems are exacerbated by the time they reach adulthood.

Reno was a founding member of the board of directors for the Innocence Project, a nonprofit organization which assists prisoners who may be exonerated through DNA testing, in 2004. By 2013 she was director emeritus of the board of directors.

== Personal life ==
Reno never married and did not have children. She took Spanish lessons during her time as state attorney. She remained active after her diagnosis of Parkinson's disease in 1995; she learned inline skating in 1996. After her mother's death in 1992, Reno inherited her childhood home. In response to a 1998 Saturday Night Live sketch, which portrayed her as lonely, former Justice Department public affairs director Carl Stern said, "Both in Florida and in Washington she has a great many friends whose homes she visits, and she goes to plays, her dance card is full."

== Death ==
Reno died from Parkinson's disease on November 7, 2016. She was surrounded by friends and family at the end of her life, including her sister Maggy and her goddaughter. Upon her death, President Barack Obama praised Reno for her "intellect, integrity, and fierce commitment to justice" and President Clinton released a statement thanking Reno "for her service, counsel, and friendship".

== Awards and honors ==
Glamour magazine named Reno one of its "Women of the Year" for 1993. In 2000, Reno was inducted into the National Women's Hall of Fame. In March 2008, Reno received the Council on Litigation Management's Professionalism Award, which recognizes and commemorates an individual who has demonstrated the unique ability to lead others by example in the highest standard of their profession.

On April 17, 2009, Reno was awarded the Justice Award by the American Judicature Society. Eric Holder, Attorney General in the Obama Administration, presented the award to Reno. Seth Andersen, Executive Vice President of AJS said the award recognizes "her commitment to improving our systems of justice and educating Americans about our great common enterprise – to ensure equality under the law". The award is the highest given by the AJS, and recognizes significant contributions toward improvements in the administration of justice within the United States.

== In popular culture ==
Reno had a higher profile than many of her immediate predecessors. She appeared on the cover of Time and was the subject of a Vanity Fair profile.

Four days after the seizure of Elián González, Reno was featured in the South Park episode "Quintuplets 2000".

Late night hosts frequently joked about her height and perceived lack of traditional femininity, and Will Ferrell repeatedly portrayed Reno on Saturday Night Live. In 2001, Reno appeared alongside Ferrell on Saturday Night Live in the final installment of the recurring sketch "Janet Reno's Dance Party".

In a 2007 Super Bowl XLI TV commercial, Reno was among the guests at Chad Ochocinco's Super Bowl party.

Reno curated a compilation of old-time American songs performed by contemporary artists, titled Song of America. Reno worked with music producer Ed Pettersen (her niece's husband) on the project. Reno said her goal with the project was to share music with her great-nieces and great-nephews.

In 2013, Reno voiced herself for the "Dark Knight Court" episode of The Simpsons.

She was depicted by Jane Lynch in Manhunt: Unabomber, a fictionalized account of the true story of the FBI's hunt for the Unabomber.

Anquette, an R&B girl group from Miami, dedicated a song to her on their 1988 album Respect.

The Offspring's 2001 song "Original Prankster" from their album Conspiracy of One mentioned her.

== See also ==
- List of female justice ministers
- List of female United States Cabinet members
- List of first women lawyers and judges in the United States

== General and cited references ==
Attribution

- This article incorporates text from the Department of Justice Web site, which is in the public domain.

Legal offices
Preceded by William Barr	United States Attorney General; 1993–2001	Succeeded by John Ashcroft
