= Dark Knight Court =

- The Simpsons episode
- Episode no.: Season 24; Episode 16
- Directed by: Mark Kirkland
- Written by: Billy Kimball; Ian Maxtone-Graham
- Production code: RABF10
- Original air date: March 17, 2013

Guest appearances
- Janet Reno as herself; Maggy Reno Hurchalla as Janet Reno

Episode features
- Chalkboard gag: "Jesus's last words were not 'TGIF' (Thank God It's Friday)"
- Couch gag: Marge, Bart, Lisa, and Maggie are Easter eggs placed on a grass nest on the couch. Homer comes in and sits on them.

Episode chronology
← Previous "Black Eyed, Please"	Next → "What Animated Women Want"
- The Simpsons season 24

"Dark Knight Court" is the sixteenth episode of the twenty-fourth season of the American animated television series The Simpsons, and the 524th episode overall. The episode was directed by Mark Kirkland and written by Billy Kimball and Ian Maxtone-Graham. It originally aired on the Fox network in the United States on March 17, 2013.

In this episode, Bart denies committing a prank but is put on trial while Mr. Burns decides to be a superhero. Former United States Attorney General Janet Reno appeared as herself and shared the role with her sister Maggy Reno Hurchalla. The episode received mixed reviews.

The episode is dedicated to the recently deceased Robert Reno, whose sisters Maggy Reno Hurchalla and Janet Reno appear in the episode.

== Plot ==
While performing at an Easter celebration, the Springfield Elementary band members inadvertently launch hundreds of eggs from their instruments, ruining the townspeople's clothes and splattering the streets. "Suspicion quickly falls on Bart, who the townspeople believe is responsible, but he denies committing the prank because he would never ruin another holiday after Thanksgiving incident of 1990 and the Christmas incident of 1997. Lisa uses Maggie as a lie detector because Bart is only able to tell her the truth, and after Bart's statement of innocence passes the Maggie-test Lisa decides that the best way to resolve the issue is to hold a trial at SES, which is presided over by Janet Reno. Lisa initially provides a strong defense but when she describes Bart as a good kid, Judge Reno admonishes her for opening Skinner's cross-examination to include everyone who has factual evidence about Bart NOT being a good kid (Skinner says "I call everyone in the world!") as Lisa groans and Bart looks horrified. Meanwhile, Mr. Burns rediscovers his love of superheroes after visiting Comic Book Guy's store, and he decides to become a superhero named Fruitbat Man. Smithers, fearful for Burns' safety, stages numerous crimes for his boss to thwart, using Homer, Lenny, Carl, the Crazy Cat Lady, and other citizens as paid fake villains for Fruit Bat Man to "defeat". Desperate to find someone to solve Bart's dilemma, Lisa tries to hire Burns, but he tells her to get lost. Smithers admits to Burns all his previous exploits were faked, and this was Burns' one chance to really help someone.

As Marge washes the town's clothes, she and Lisa notice that Groundskeeper Willie's kilt is stained with only one egg, which appears to have been crushed into it by hand. Realizing that Willie is the culprit, Lisa confronts him; he confesses to committing the prank due to his hatred of the Easter holiday (as he is a Scottish Old Believer Presbyterian) and shreds the kilt to destroy the evidence. As he tries to escape on his tractor, Burns intervenes and captures him, having had a change of heart. Burns turns Willie over to the court just before Reno can deliver a guilty verdict against Bart. Lisa thanks Burns and suggests that he might take advantage of his heroics to become a better person; meanwhile, Moe (who testified about Bart's cruel history of prank calls against him) breaks down sobbing after he gets a phone call informing him of Bart's acquittal.

Before the end credits, there is a trailer for the "Dependables", a spoof that casts several of Springfield's elderly residents as a superhero team.

== Production ==
The producers offered former United States Attorney General Janet Reno to appear as herself in August 2012. Because Reno's Parkinson's disease prevented her from speaking the script's long lines, Reno's sister Maggy Hurchalla called the producers to decline. Upon hearing her voice and noting the similarity with Reno's voice, the producers asked if they could share the role. Reno spoke the one-liners while Hurchalla spoke the longer lines.

The episode was given an in memoriam dedication at the end for Janet and Maggy's brother Robert Reno, who died eight months earlier along with a prologue stating that Janet and Maggy's proceeds from their voice over roles donated to The Innocence Project.

== Reception ==
=== Ratings ===
The episode received a 2.2 in the 18-49 demographic and was watched by a total of 4.89 million viewers. This made it the second most watched show on Fox's Animation Domination line up that night.

=== Critical reception ===
Robert David Sullivan of The A.V. Club gave the episode a B, saying "Earlier this season, I wrote that Mr. Burns was getting tiresome as a character. So though 'Dark Knight Court' isn't necessarily the funniest episode of the season, it is one of the most pleasantly surprising."

Teresa Lopez of TV Fanatic gave the episode 3 out of 5 stars. She felt the appearance by Janet Reno to be dated but liked the references to early Simpsons jokes.

Rob H. Dawson of TV Equals said "The Simpsons is at its best when it doesn't stray too far from its roots as a take on the family sitcom, and the Batman parody in 'Dark Knight Court' just didn't hit that mark for me."

== See also ==
- List of Easter television episodes
