= James Rosebush =

American author and political aide

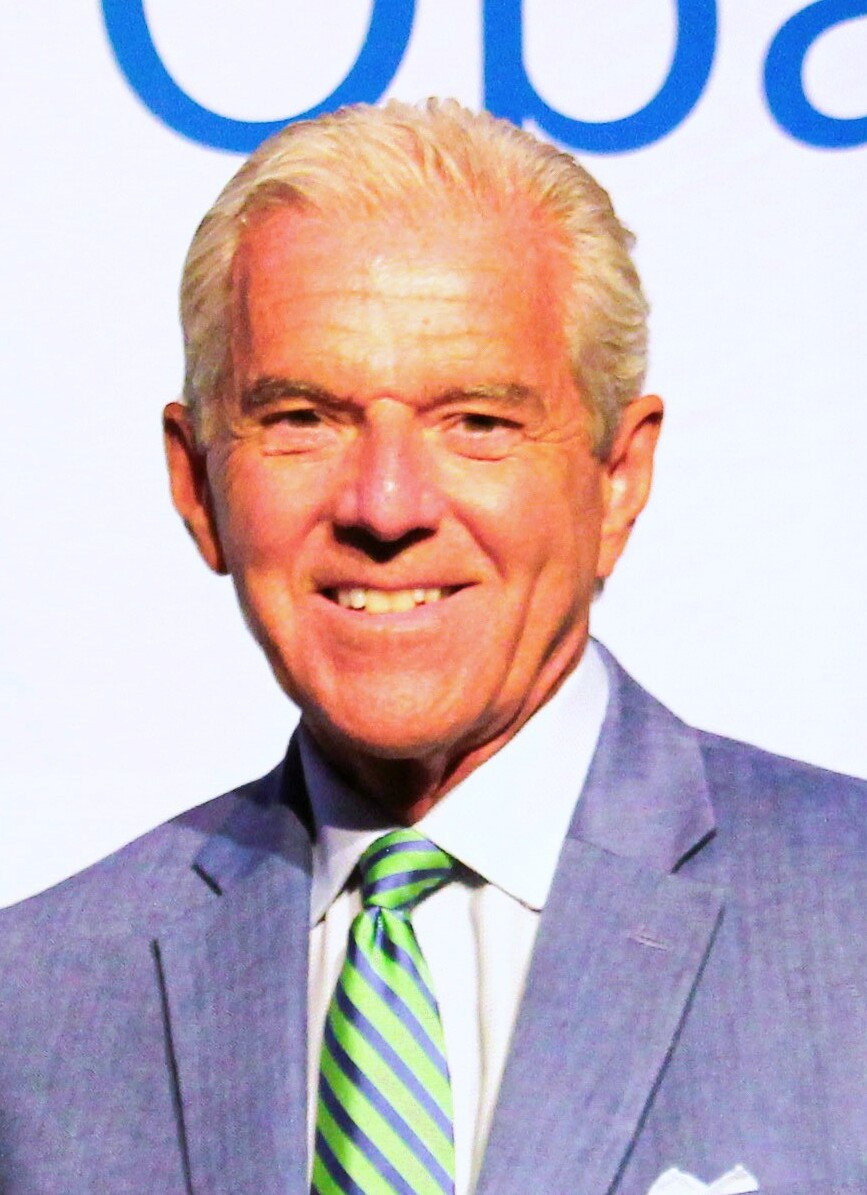
- Rosebush in 2022

2nd Chief of Staff to the First Lady of the United States
- In office 1981–1986
- President: Ronald Reagan
- First Lady: Nancy Reagan
- Preceded by: Edith H. J. Dobelle
- Succeeded by: Lee L. Verstandig

Personal details
- Born: Flint, Michigan, U.S.
- Education: Boston University; Principia College
- Website: growthstrategy.us

James Rosebush is an American author and political aide who served simultaneously as a deputy assistant to U.S. President Ronald Reagan, Chief of Staff to the First Lady of the United States, Nancy Reagan, and Senior White House Advisor, making him the only White House office staff ever to hold all three positions at once. He is a public speaker on leadership, politics, philanthropy, and business.

== Biography ==
Rosebush is a native of Flint, Michigan. His mother, Jacqueline Rosebush, was a homemaker, and his father, Kenneth Rosebush, was a General Motors executive and Dale Carnegie instructor. At age 20 Rosebush was cited as an Outstanding Young Man in America and selected as a Rotary International Scholar, where he traveled to the Soviet Union to meet with high ranking government officials and tutor Russians in English. He later earned an MA degree in Public Affairs from Boston University, and a Bachelor of Arts in Business from Principia College.

== Reagan White House ==
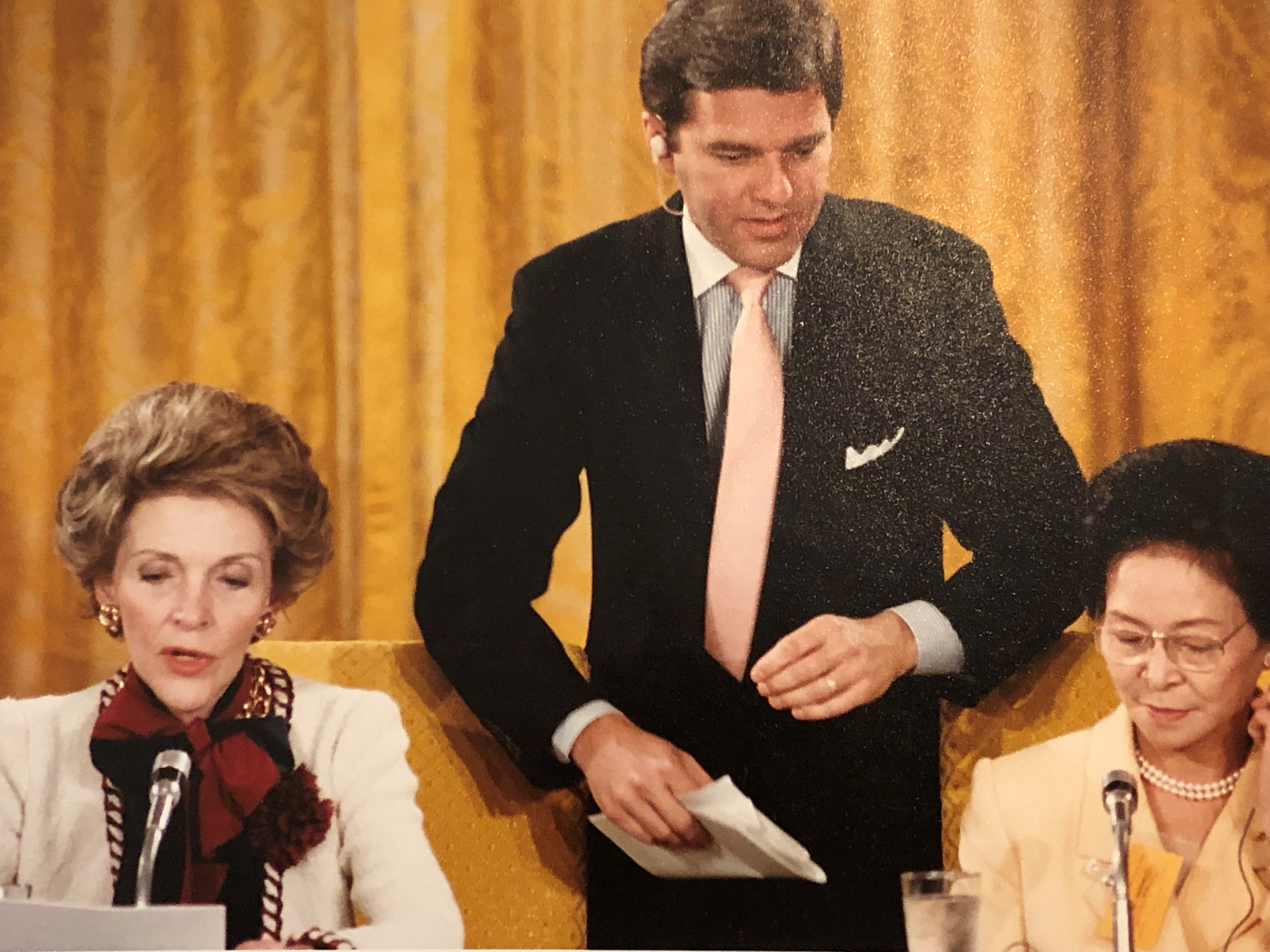
Rosebush with Nancy Reagan and First Lady of South Korea Lee Soon-ja at the "First Ladies to fight drug abuse globally" conference in White House East Room in 1982

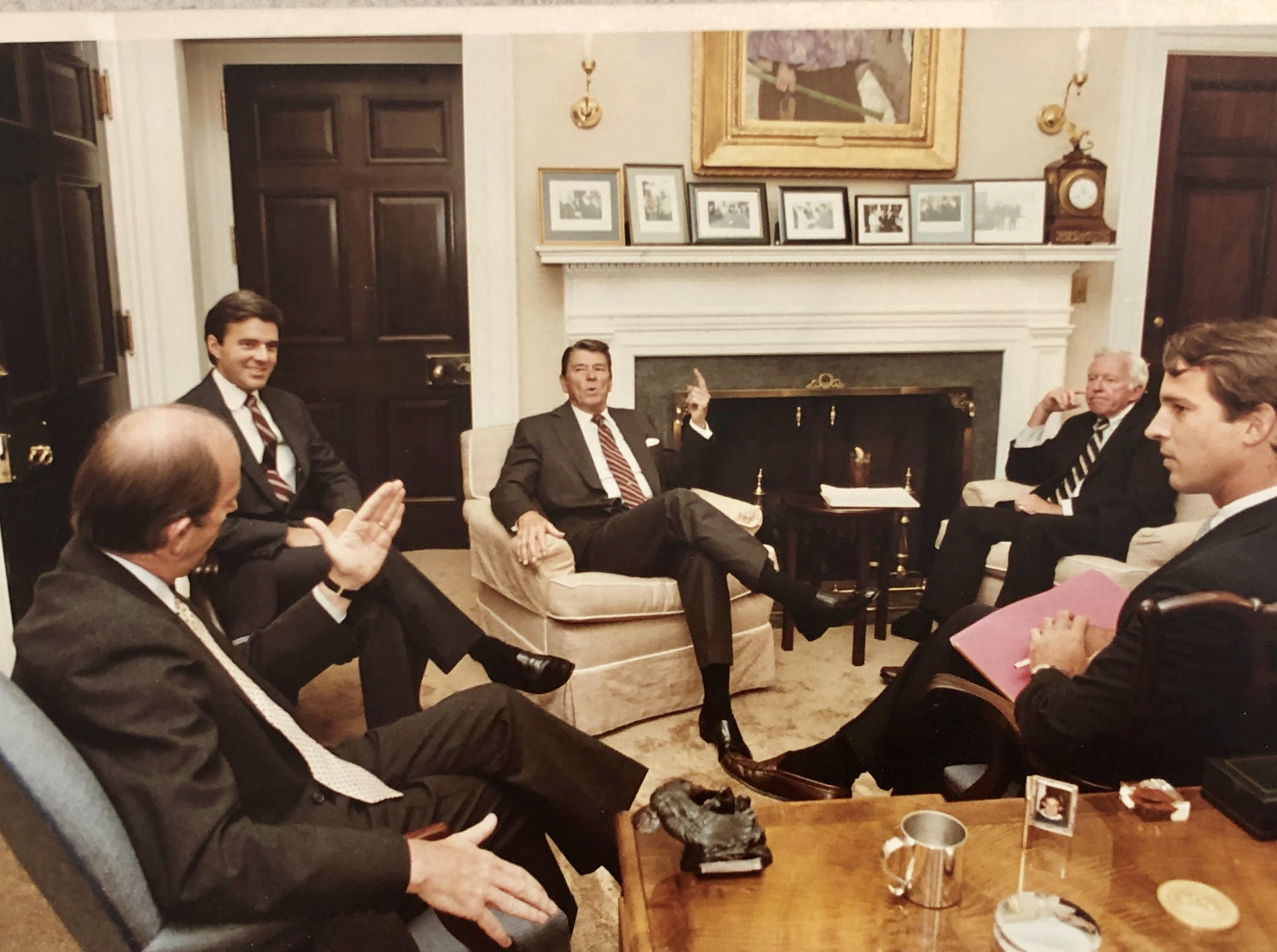
Rosebush (top left), Ronald Reagan, William Verity Jr., Jay Moorhead and Michael Deaver discussing Public-Private partnerships in the President’s private office in 1982

Entering the White House at age 32 in 1981, Rosebush served as the deputy assistant to Ronald Reagan, where he had daily one-on-one access to the President. He was also the President's point-person when it came to philanthropy and Public-private partnerships. During his tenure he managed the President's domestic policy program Private Sector Initiatives, he was appointed to become US Ambassador to UNESCO, and he negotiated with Russian officials for the historic bi-lateral meeting between Reagan and Mikhail Gorbachev. He was also invited by the Austrian Government to tour Austria as a Goodwill ambassador.

In addition to his role as advisor to the President, Rosebush simultaneously served as Chief of Staff to First Lady Reagan, making him the only White House staffer to ever hold both positions at the same time. In his latter role he managed Mrs. Reagan's official activities including press and media, scheduling, projects and policy, as well as overseeing the "Just Say No" drug campaign she spearheaded in 1982. Rosebush was the longest-serving Chief of Staff to Nancy Reagan. He left the White House in 1986.

== 1986-Current ==
After leaving the White House, Rosebush founded the international advisory firm GrowthStrategy, Inc, which builds and grows corporate, family office, and philanthropic organizations. He also serves as an advisor to individual families on wealth management. In 2018 he launched Intersection Impact Fund, which centers on impact investing and philanthropy. He lectures around the world and is a frequent guest on news programs and podcasts.

== Books ==
Rosebush has written three books. Published in 1988, First Lady, Public Wife was the first book to explore the role of the First Lady as a demanding and rigorous job. Published in 2016 by Hachette Book Group, True Reagan: What Made Ronald Reagan Great and Why It Matters is a first-hand account of what made Reagan tick. In 2020, also by Hachette, Winning Your Audience: Deliver a Message with the Confidence of a President shows how to give President-caliber presentations.

== Advisory boards ==
Rosebush served as the president of the Fairfax County Education Foundation, Chief Executive of the Howe School, and President of the Urban Monuments Foundation. He has served on the Board of The Phillips Collection, where he originated the Duncan Phillips Collectors Medal awarded to Leonard Lauder and David Rockefeller. He was director of corporate contributions for The Standard Oil Company, founding vice president for the National Chamber Foundation, and held management positions with the New England Association of Grantmakers and the Charles Stewart Mott Foundation. He was also appointed to the Woodrow Wilson Teaching Fellowship at Princeton University. He has lectured and taught as an adjunct professor at Georgetown University and George Washington University on corporate public issues and the history of philanthropy. He has also served as treasurer on the board of Longyear Museum.

== Personal life ==
Rosebush resides in the Washington, DC area. He has been married to the former Nancy Paull since 1974, has two grown daughters, and six grandchildren.
