= William H. Dobelle =

American medical researcher (1941–2004)

- Born: October 24, 1941; Massachusetts, United States
- Died: October 5, 2004 (aged 62); New York City, United States
- Education: Johns Hopkins University, Vanderbilt University, University of Utah
- Spouse: Claire Dobelle
- Children: 3

Dr. Bill Dobelle (October 24, 1941 – October 5, 2004) was a biomedical researcher who developed experimental technologies that restored limited sight to blind patients, and also known for the impact he and his company had on the breathing pacemaker industry with the development of the only FDA approved device for phrenic nerve pacing. He was the former director of the Division of Artificial Organs at the Columbia-Presbyterian Medical Center.

== Education ==
Dobelle was born in Pittsfield, Massachusetts, on October 24, 1941, to orthopedic surgeon Martin Dobelle and Lillian Mendelsohn Dobelle. His younger brother Evan Dobelle is a politician and educator.

With his father, Dobelle designed improvements for the artificial hip when he was 13. He started college at Vanderbilt the following year, though he soon dropped out to pursue other interests. In 1957, he won the South Florida Regional Regional Science fair with an X-ray machine he built the previous year; he then went on to win the National Science Fair with the device. He earned his bachelor's and master's degrees in biophysics at Johns Hopkins University, where he worked on the development of medical tests. He finished his Ph.D. in neurophysiology at the University of Utah.

== Career and artificial vision ==
Dobelle was the CEO of the Dobelle Institute, headquartered in Lisbon, Portugal, which concentrates on artificial vision for the blind.

He was associate director of the Institute of Biological Engineering at the University of Utah from 1969–1975, and persuaded General Instrument to donate a microcircuit laboratory to the school. He later served as director of the Division of Artificial Organs at Columbia-Presbyterian Medical Center. He was a founding fellow of the American Institute for Medical and Biological Engineering. Throughout his career, he worked closely with friend and mentor Willem Johan Kolff, with whom he was nominated for the Nobel Prize in Physiology or Medicine in 2003.

In 1983, he bought Avery Laboratories (now Avery Biomedical Devices), where he worked on neurostimulation and the artificial eye. Dobelle led one of several teams of scientists around the world seeking to develop technology for artificial vision. Dobelle's teams developed a brain implant which films the visual field in front of the patient and transmits it to the brain's visual cortex, allowing the patient to see outlines. He received widespread publicity on January 17, 2000, when it was announced that a patient known as "Jerry," blind after a blow to his head 36 years previously, had regained his ability see thanks to the artificial eye Dobelle had spent over 30 years developing. Jerry "sees" by wearing spectacles attached to a miniature camera and an ultrasonic rangefinder. They feed signals to a computer worn on the waistband, which processes the video and distance data, which is then sent by another computer to 68 platinum electrodes implanted in Jerry's brain, on the surface of the visual cortex. He sees a simple display of dots that outline an object. Jerry's vision is the same as a severely shortsighted person—equivalent to 20/400. He is able to read two-inch letters at five feet.

The Dobelle Eye has been tested in several people, allowing individuals who were once completely blind to see the outlines of images in the form of white dots on a black background. In 2002, 38-year-old Jens Naumann, a blind man, was able to use the device to drive a car in the parking lot of the Dobelle Institute. His story was documented in the film Blind Hope. Cheri Robertson, a 41-year-old woman who was also implanted with the system, was profiled in the documentary "Robochick and the Bionic Boy" in 2008.

=== Portable breathing pacemaker ===
Dobelle's Avery Biomedical Devices also created the portable breathing pacemaker, which has been used by patients with quadriplegia, central sleep apnea, and other respiratory ailments.

== Literature and media ==
- Robert Frenay called Dobelle's success "the first meaningful demonstration of artificial vision" in his 2006 work Pulse: The Coming Age of Systems and Machines Inspired by Living Things.
- Andy Clark mentions the "Dobelle Eye" in Natural-Born Cyborgs: Minds, Technologies, and the Future of Human Intelligence (pg. 124, Oxford University Press, 2004).
- Dobelle is discussed in Ramez Naam's critically acclaimed More Than Human: Embracing the Promise of Biological Enhancement (Published Aug. 2010).
- Ross Heaven and Simon Buxton discuss Dobelle and his success with patient Jens Naumann in their 2005 book Darkness Visible: Awakening Spiritual Light through Darkness Meditation.
- W. Andrew Robinson references Dobelle along with others from Johns Hopkins University in The Last Man Who Knew Everything: Thomas Young.
- A description of Dobelle's artificial eye provided on page 169 of William Lyon's Matters of the Mind (Published in 2001).
- Dobelle's methods are explained in the Handbook of Neuroprosthetic Methods (Biomedical Engineering) edited by Warren E. Finn and Peter G. LoPresti.
- Dobelle's successes are discussed in Brian Clegg's Upgrade Me: Our Amazing Journey to Human 2.0 (pages 228-230, Published in 2008).
- His research is mentioned in The Posthuman Condition: Consciousness Beyond the Brain by Robert Pepperell.
- Some aspects of Dobelle's methods are challenged in The Prosthetic Impulse: From a Posthuman Present to a Biocultural Future, by Joanne Morra and Journal of Visual Culture editor Marquard Smith (Published: The MIT Press, December 2005).
- Dobelle is briefly discussed in Victor D. Chase's Shattered Nerves: How Science Is Solving Modern Medicine's Most Perplexing Problem (Pages 200-201, The Johns Hopkins University Press, 2004).
- Dobelle is profiled in Simon Ings' A Natural History of Seeing: The Art and Science of Vision.
- In Donald G. Oakley's In Search of the Self, the award-winning former newspaper columnist explains how he was personally impacted by an exchange of letters between himself and Dobelle (Chapter 6). The novel chronicles Oakley's journey to deepen his understanding of the burgeoning field known as consciousness studies, as well as explores the evolution of society's understanding of the brain.
- Neurologist Richard Restak explores how Dobelle's design has shaped the future of artificial vision in The New Brain: How the Modern Age is Rewiring Your Mind (Rodale Books, 2004)
- Dobelle is profiled in Patrick Yearly's They Were Giants 2006 alongside leaders and pioneers in various other fields.
- Dobelle's early research and final accomplishments in the field of artificial vision are extensively examined throughout the textbook Visual Prosthetics: Physiology, Bioengineering, Rehabilitation (edited by Gislin Dagnelie).
- Dobelle is profiled by Hugh Darrow in the popular video game Deus Ex: Human Revolution.
- In Susanne D. Coates' Neural Interfacing: Forging the Human Machine Connection (Synthesis Lectures on Biomedical Engineering), she claims "[w]ith the passing of Dobelle in 2004, 30 years of work developing the "Dobelle Artificial Vision System" came to a halt. There are a few groups who continue to experiment with cortical vision implants [51] but no system like Dobelle's is presently available" (40).
- Profiled in several editions of The Guinness Book of World Records under the heading First Artificial Eye.

== Sources ==
- "Medical Marvels"
- Feature article sidebar in Mechanical Engineering, 2003
- Popular Mechanics article, 2002
- Kotler, Steven (September 1, 2002). "Vision Quest". Wired.
- "William H. Dobelle (obituary)". Syosset-Jericho Tribune. 2004-10-22. Archived from the original on 2007-09-30.
- "William H. Dobelle (obituary)". SignOn San Diego. 2004-11-04.
