= Katie Meier =

American basketball player-coach (born 1967)

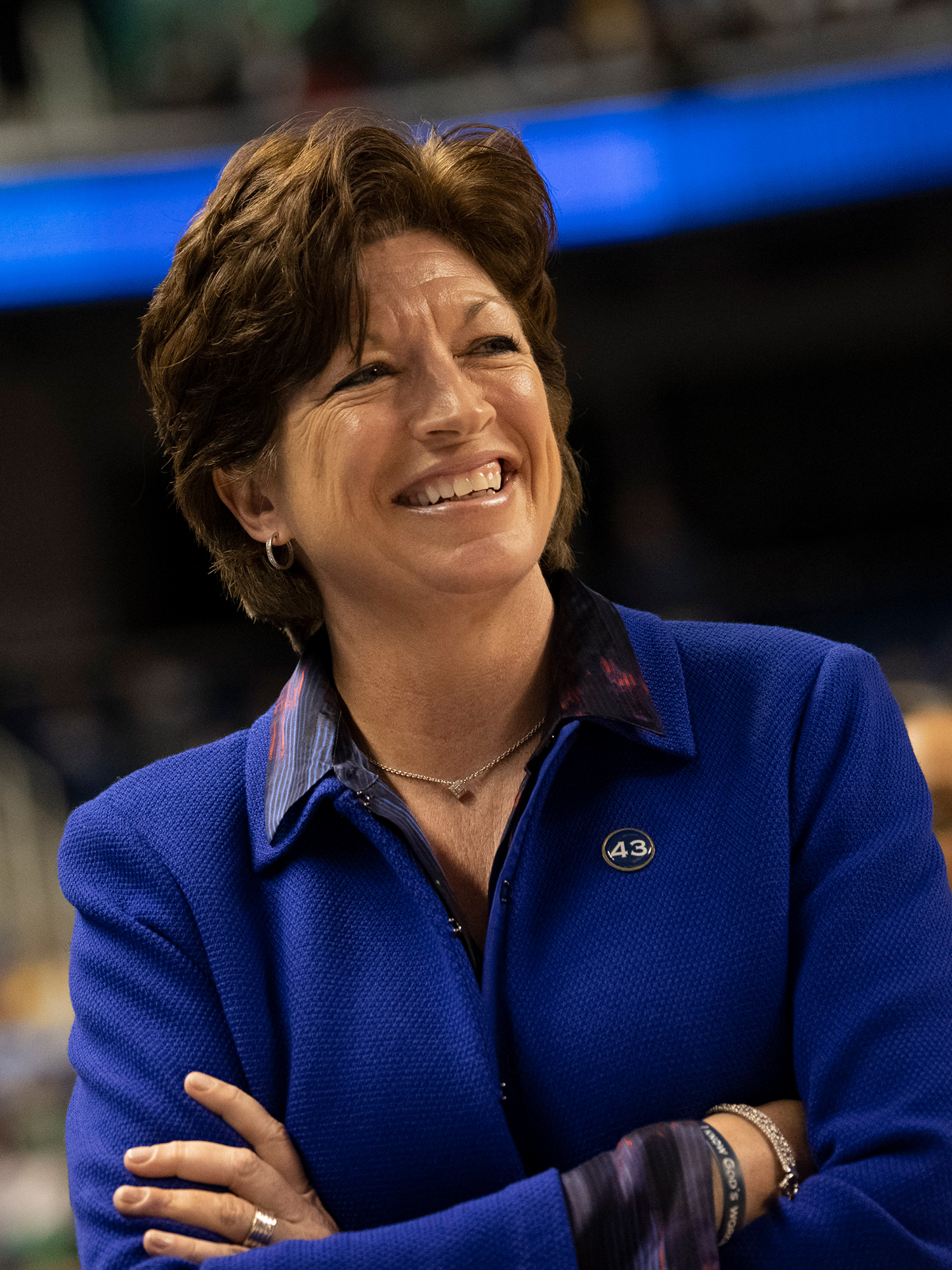
- Meier in 2019

Biographical details
- Born: December 19, 1967 (age 58); Wheaton, Illinois, U.S.

Playing career
- 1985–1990: Duke

Coaching career (HC unless noted)
- 1993–1994: UNC Asheville (assistant)
- 1994–2001: Tulane (assistant/associate)
- 2001–2005: Charlotte
- 2005–2024: Miami (FL)

Head coaching record
- Overall: 441–281 (.611)

Accomplishments and honors

Awards
- AP Coach of the Year (2011); USA Basketball National Coach of the Year award (2013)
Medal record
Women's basketball
FIBA Americas Under–18 Championship
Gold medal – first place	2012 Gurabo, Puerto Rico	Team competition
FIBA U19
Gold medal – first place	2013 Lithuania	Team competition

Katie Meier (born December 19, 1967) is an American former college basketball coach who last coached the women's basketball team at the University of Miami in Coral Gables, Florida. She is a 1990 graduate of Duke University, where she played college basketball.

Upon her retirement from coaching in 2024, Meier had the most wins (362) of any coach of the University of Miami women's basketball team in the program's 50-year history.

== Playing career ==
Meier's success as a coach is a direct reflection on her playing career as a stand-out at Duke University. A four-year letter winner for the Blue Devils under head coach Debbie Leonard from 1986 to 1990, Meier's name is scattered throughout the Duke record books. In 1990, Meier was named to the team representing the United States at the William Jones Cup competition in Taipei, Taiwan. The USA team was primarily made up of players from North Carolina State, while Meier was one of three players from other schools. The team had a record of 3–4 in the competition. Meier averaged 5.9 points per game.

She currently ranks third all-time in scoring average (16.2 points per game), steals (232), free throws made (447) and free throws attempted (624). She also ranks fourth all-time in points (1,761), and fifth all-time in field goals made (653), field goals attempted (1,283) and assists (409) and ninth all-time at Duke in rebounding average (6.1 rebounds per game).

At Duke, in 1986, she earned ACC Rookie of the Year and Basketball Yearbook Freshman All-America honors. Meier injured her knee during her in 1988 during her junior season and ultimately missed the entire 1989 campaign while recovering.

Following graduation, Meier headed overseas to play professional basketball, spending three seasons with BBC Mini-Flat team in Waregam, Belgium from 1990 until 1993.

== Duke statistics ==
Legend
GP	Games played	GS	Games started	MPG	Minutes per game
FG%	Field goal percentage	3P%	3-point field goal percentage	FT%	Free throw percentage
RPG	Rebounds per game	APG	Assists per game	SPG	Steals per game
BPG	Blocks per game	PPG	Points per game	**Bold**	Career high

	Team	GP	Points	FG%	3P%	FT%	RPG	APG	SPG	BPG	PPG
1985–86	Duke	**30**	438	**49.6%**	0.0%	73.9%	4.9	2.8	1.9	0.4	14.6
1986–87	Duke	29	490	48.0%	0.0%	65.3%	5.2	**4.4**	2.3	0.4	16.9
1987–88	Duke	22	304	46.4%	23.5%	**74.8%**	5.6	3.8	**2.5**	**0.7**	13.8
1989–90	Duke	28	**529**	45.9%	**26.7%**	72.9%	**8.9**	4.0	1.9	0.6	**18.9**
Career		109	1761	47.5%	25.0%	71.6%	6.1	3.8	2.1	0.5	16.2

== Coaching career ==
=== Miami (FL) ===
Meier coached for 16 seasons for the Miami Hurricanes. She led her 2010–2011 team to a 26–3 (12–2) record and claimed a share of the ACC regular season title. She was named ACC Coach of the Year for the 2010–2011 campaign, as well as the AP College Basketball Coach of the Year. In her 15 seasons leading the Canes, Meier has amassed nine 20-win seasons and coached the team to 11 postseason appearances, including 10 straight from 2009 to 2019. On November 9, 2021, she became the all time winningest coach in Miami basketball history. On March 20, 2023, her team upset 1-seeded Indiana in Simon Skjodt Assembly Hall (Indiana's home arena) by a score of 70–68 as a #9 seed. Just a day earlier, 1-seeded Stanford lost to 8-seeded Ole Miss 54–49, and as a result, South Carolina and Virginia Tech were the only 1-seeds to make it past the Second Round. Miami made it all the way to the Elite Eight (a first for the program), where they lost to 3-seeded LSU 54-42.

On March 21, 2024 Meier announced she would be retiring as the head coach.

=== Charlotte ===
During her four-year tenure at Charlotte, Meier led the 49ers to three postseason berths - one NCAA Tournament appearance (2003) and two WNIT appearances (2004, 2005) - and a combined overall record of 76–45 (.628). Prior to her appointment as head coach at Charlotte in 2001, the 49ers had only one previous postseason appearance - a WNIT berth in 1990. Meier was named both the WBCA Region IV Division I Coach of the Year and the Conference USA Coach of the Year in 2003.

In her inaugural campaign at Charlotte, Meier led the 49ers to a 16–13 finish to record their first winning season in eight years. The following season, she guided the 49ers to a 21–9 finish marking the most wins (21) in over a decade at Charlotte. With a 12–2 record in Conference USA play, Meier and the 49ers also earned the school's first-ever C-USA regular-season championship and earned the school's first-ever appearance at the NCAA Tournament.Meier was named both the WBCA Region IV Division I Coach of the Year and the Conference USA Coach of the Year in 2003.

Meier was named both the WBCA Region IV Division I Coach of the Year and the Conference USA Coach of the Year in 2003.

=== Tulane University ===
Prior to Charlotte, Meier spent seven seasons at Tulane University, serving as an associate head coach from 1999 to 2001 and an assistant coach on the Green Wave staff from 1994 to 1999. As a member of the Tulane coaching staff, Meier helped the Green Wave to an overall record of 164–52 (.759) in seven seasons, including the highest ranking in school history (13th by the Associated Press) in 2000 and a school-record 27 wins the same season.

During her time at Tulane, Meier and the Green Wave also saw an impressive seven-year run at the NCAA Tournament.

=== UNC Asheville ===
Meier began her collegiate coaching career at the University of North Carolina at Asheville where she served as an assistant coach during the 1993–94 season.

=== USA basketball ===
Meier served as the head coach of the USA Women's USA U18 team, representing the US in the FIBA Americas Championship in Gurabo, Puerto Rico where the team won all five games, resulting in the gold medal for the competition. She then continued as the head coach of the USA U19 team, which represented the US in the FIBA U19 World Championship held in Panevezys and Klaipeda, Lithuania in 2013. The helped guide the team to a 9–0 record, which resulted in the gold medal for the competition. She was named (along with Billy Donovan), co-recipient of the 2013 USA Basketball National Coach of the Year award.

== Personal life ==
Meier married her wife, former Miami TV personality Hunter Reno, in 2022.

== Head coaching record ==
Record table
Season	Team	Overall	Conference	Standing	Postseason
**Charlotte** (Conference USA) (2001–2005)
2001–02	Charlotte	16–13	7–7	8th	
2002–03	Charlotte	21–9	12–2	1st	NCAA First Round
2003–04	Charlotte	17–14	8–6	7th	WNIT Second Round
2004–05	Charlotte	22–9	9–5	5th	WNIT First Round
Charlotte:		76–45 (.628)	36–20 (.643)		
**Miami** (Atlantic Coast Conference) (2005–2024)
2005–06	Miami	17–13	6–8	T-6th	WNIT Second Round
2006–07	Miami	11–19	2–12	11th	
2007–08	Miami	9–21	2–12	T-12th	
2008–09	Miami	13–17	2–12	T-12th	
2009–10	Miami	22–14	4–10	T-10th	WNIT Runner Up
2010–11	Miami	28–5	12–2	T-1st	NCAA Second Round
2011–12	Miami	26–6	14–2	2nd	NCAA Second Round
2012–13	Miami	21–11	11–7	T-4th	NCAA First Round
2013–14	Miami	16–15	8–8	8th	WNIT First Round
2014–15	Miami	20–13	8–8	T-7th	NCAA Second Round
2015–16	Miami	24–9	10–6	5th	NCAA First Round
2016–17	Miami	24–9	10–6	7th	NCAA Second Round
2017–18	Miami	21–11	10–6	T-6th	NCAA First Round
2018–19	Miami	25–9	12–4	T-3rd	NCAA Second Round
2019–20	Miami	15–15	7–11	T-11th	
2020–21	Miami	11–11	8–10	T–9th	
2021–22	Miami	21–13	10–8	T-7th	NCAA Second Round
2022–23	Miami	22–13	11–7	T-6th	NCAA Elite Eight
2023–24	Miami	19–12	8–10	9th	
Miami:		365–236 (.607)	155–149 (.510)		
Total:		441–281 (.611)			
National champion Postseason invitational champion Conference regular season champion Conference regular season and conference tournament champion Division regular season champion Division regular season and conference tournament champion Conference tournament champion

== Awards and honors ==
- 2003 WBCA Region IV Division I Coach of the Year
- 2003 Conference USA Coach of the Year
- 2011 Russell Athletic/WBCA Region 2 Division I Coach of the Year
- 2011 AP College Basketball Coach of the Year
- 2013 USA Basketball National Coach of the Year award

== External ==
- Video highlights of the co-recipients of the 2013 USA Basketball National Coach of the Year award
