= True Reagan =

2016 book by James Rosebush

True Reagan: What Made Ronald Reagan Great and Why It Matters
- Cover of the 2016 Center Street edition
- Author: James Rosebush
- Language: English
- Publication date: 2016

True Reagan: What Made Ronald Reagan Great and Why It Matters is a 2016 book by James Rosebush, the former advisor to Ronald Reagan and Chief of Staff to Nancy Reagan. It offers a first-hand perspective on the President's personality, his decision-making, and his noted private nature.

== Contents ==
Having daily one-on-one access to the President during 1981-1986, Rosebush was the only White House staffer ever to simultaneously hold the position of advisor to the President and Chief of Staff to Nancy Reagan. He takes up the challenge of divulging more than most have about Ronald Reagan, an intensely private man with a notable inscrutable nature; Reagan didn't ever disclose much about what was going on in his heart. Rosebush says Reagan could easily talk about things like his love of his country and his image of it as a “shining city on a hill,” but what personally motivated him and what made him tick has largely remained hidden. Other authors have tried to go behind the facade and, according to Rosebush, have failed. For example, one of the definitive Reagan books on his presidency, Dutch: A Memoir of Ronald Reagan by Edmund Morris - who was given unlimited access to Reagan while in office - couldn't offer a clear picture of the real man. Even Reagan’s closest and longtime aide Michael Deaver opted to title his own book about Reagan A Different Drummer.

Part of this Reagan mystery is due to the fact that as the son of an alcoholic father, Reagan carried the wounds and memories of dragging his drunken dad into several rental apartments and houses where his family lived, to warm up and dry out after regular binges. For Reagan to reveal what was going on inside was just too expensive emotionally. Nancy Reagan once said, “Sometimes I can’t even reach Ronnie myself.”

Through conversations with the President in settings such as Air Force One, foreign trips, and talks in the family quarters, Rosebush delves more into what really moved Reagan and what he was thinking about inside that was rarely revealed on the outside. Rosebush reveals that what's inside the man is nothing rare or scandalous, but simply that Reagan had, like few other Presidents, a closely held perceived relationship with his God, and a dependence on it, always asking of himself and of the world, “What is really going on?” Though their conversations weren't always about religion, Rosebush was able to sit Reagan down and ask him questions like, “Do you really read the Bible?” and “What are your favorite texts and how do they help you?” Rosebush hopes the President's candid answers to these personal questions can help guide us back to the American exceptionalism of the 80s, but with the quintessential Reagan humility.

== Reception ==
True Reagan, published by Hachette Book Group, received mostly favorable reviews in the press, mainly for Rosebush's up-close portrayal of a president with a notable private nature.

A review by The Washington Times read, "Books authored by persons who worked alongside a famous figure tend to focus considerable attention on the author, but Rosebush makes himself invisible, and strives strictly to help us understand the real Ronald Reagan."

McAlester News-Capital said, "Rosebush uses his own experiences in the White House to reveal the quietest of peeks into Reagan’s thoughts."
