= Evan Dobelle =

American public official and college administrator

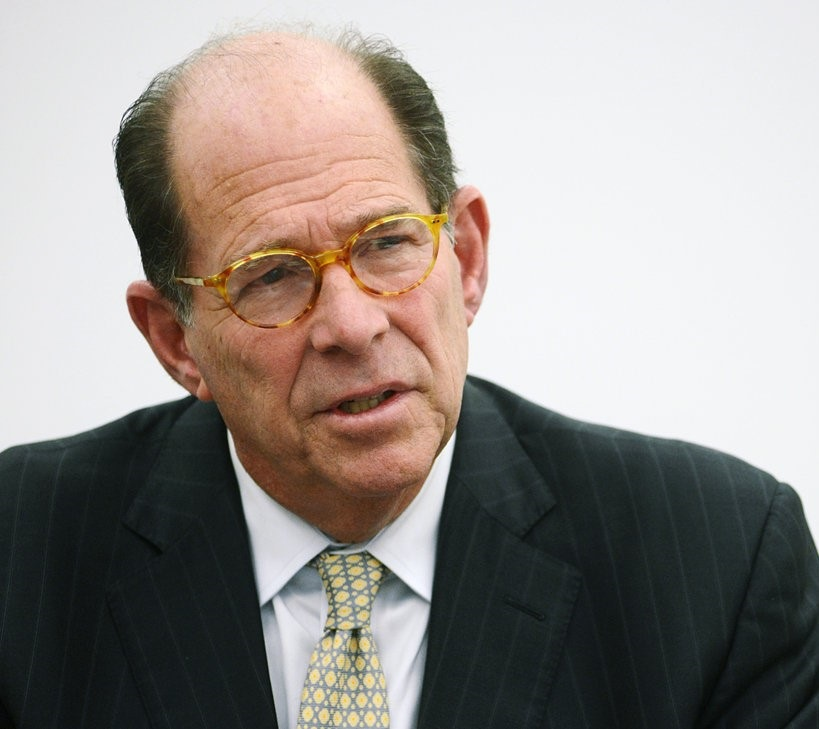

Treasurer of the Democratic National Committee
- In office April 1978 – March 1979
- Preceded by: Joel McCleary
- Succeeded by: Peter G. Kelly

19th Chief of Protocol of the United States
- In office March 2, 1977 – May 22, 1978
- President: Jimmy Carter
- Preceded by: Shirley Temple Black
- Succeeded by: Kit Dobelle

Personal details
- Born: April 22, 1945 (age 81) Washington, D.C., U.S.
- Party: Democratic
- Spouse: Kit Dobelle
- Education: University of Massachusetts, Amherst (BA, MA, EdD); Harvard University (MPA)

Evan Samuel Dobelle (born April 22, 1945) is a former public official and higher-education administrator who is known for promoting higher-education investment in the Creative Economy, public-private partnerships and the "College Ready" model that helps students graduate from high school and college.

== Early life ==
Dobelle was born in Washington, D.C., on April 22, 1945. Dobelle's father was prominent American surgeon Martin Dobelle; his older brother was medical researcher William H. Dobelle. Dobelle grew up between Pittsfield, Massachusetts and Cocoa Beach, Florida, where his father served on the medical staff for Project Mercury.

Dobelle began his undergraduate education at The Citadel, The Military College of South Carolina, where he was named a Distinguished Alumnus.

== Education and career ==
Dobelle holds bachelor's, master's, and doctoral degrees in education administration from the University of Massachusetts Amherst, and a master's degree in public administration from Harvard University. Elected mayor of Pittsfield, Massachusetts, in 1973 and 1975, Dobelle was later Massachusetts State Commissioner of Environmental Management and Natural Resources.

He was U.S. Chief of Protocol for the White House in the Carter administration with the rank of Ambassador. His wife, Edith H. J. Dobelle, served as Chief of Protocol and Chief of Staff to First Lady Rosalynn Carter. He was the treasurer and deputy chair of the Democratic National Committee and National Chairman of the Carter-Mondale Presidential Committee.

Long before the 1980 presidential race, Dobelle worked as a Research Associate for Governor Ronald Reagan's commission for educational reform.

Dobelle was President of Middlesex Community College in Lowell, Massachusetts from 1987 to 1990.

Dobelle was subsequently President and Chancellor of City College of San Francisco from 1990 to 1995. While in San Francisco, Dobelle decentralized administrative functions - a managerial model the college celebrated and maintained until it went into state receivership in 2012 nearly losing its accreditation. While issues were identified by FCMAT, the report was issued seventeen years and three presidents after the end of Dobelle's tenure and none of the findings were attributed to Dobelle.

While president of Trinity College in Hartford, Connecticut (1995–2001), neighborhood renewal reversed declining enrollments.

As president of the University of Hawaiʻi from 2001 to 2004, he backed unifying the system's campuses, established the Academy of Creative Media, built a new medical school, reformed financial and building practices and strengthened Native Hawaiian programs. He was also criticized for politicizing the university by endorsing Democrat Mazie Hirono for governor and for paying unusually high salaries to administrators (though typical by mainland standards). On June 15, 2004, Dobelle was fired by the Board of Regents, but this firing was deemed illegal and void. Turnover on the Board of Regents meant that there were no Regents left who had selected him as president.

A few weeks later, Dobelle and the university reached a mediated settlement. Dobelle agreed to resign from the presidency and not to apply for any other University of Hawaiʻi positions, and the university agreed to a two-year non-tenured research position and a settlement of $1.6 million in cash, a state pension for life, and a fully paid $2 million life insurance policy, and assumed all legal costs of $1.2 million, with no finding of wrongdoing on the part of either Dobelle or the board.

The ensuing controversy caused a statewide referendum to be passed by 63% that changed the way Regents were appointed by the Governor and was upheld unanimously by the Hawaii Supreme Court. The gubernatorial advisor and Regent who had initiated the process against Dobelle was subsequently rejected for reconfirmation by the state senate.

In 2004, he became president of the New England Board of Higher Education (NEBHE). A few weeks later he was unanimously chosen to be President of NEBHE by the 48 delegates representing the six New England governors. Dobelle reorganized and focused the organization on core issues of access and affordability, significantly heightening NEBHE's visibility and increasing external funding. Dobelle also energized participation of the six states in the region for the College Ready initiative and engaged all New England Governors, SHEEOS, and K–12 Education Commissioners in a single cooperative effort to address high school graduation rates and college access.

In December 2007 Dobelle was appointed president of Westfield State College in Westfield, Massachusetts. During his tenure the school's name was changed from "college" to "university."

In August, 2013, an audit directed by the executive committee of the university's board of trustees found that Dobelle mixed personal and institutional expenses submitted for reimbursement; Dobelle countered that he had self-reported the accounting issue to the chair and the university General Counsel, and that the issue had arisen due to the existing system. Auditors also questioned other expenses, including tickets to the Boston Symphony Orchestra, and a wire transfer to Vietnam, one of several expenses from a 2008 twelve-person academic delegation to Asia meant to raise Westfield's international profile and to raise funds. Reaction to the controversy includes an investigation by the state Attorney General's office and the withdrawal of a $100,000 gift; Dobelle countered that the pledge had been made years before and was not authentic.

Dobelle called the audit and its release illegal and defaming. On November 8, 2013, Dobelle announced his resignation from Westfield State University and his retirement from public service. However, he was still both suing the university and billing it for over $90,000 in his legal fees.

On July 31, 2014, the Massachusetts Inspector General's Office published the results of its investigation of Dobelle's spending while at Westfield State. On April 30, 2015, Dobelle and the Commonwealth of Massachusetts settled. The settlement required Dobelle to pay the Commonwealth $185,000 in legal fees. The settlement agreement also prevents Dobelle from serving in any role at a Massachusetts public institution of higher learning, but with no admission of wrongdoing on the part of Dobelle.

He currently works as a consultant and board member in the nonprofit and private sectors.

== Research and recognition ==
He has researched and compiled the Saviors of Our Cities list, which spotlights the top 25 universities and colleges that are exemplary examples of community revitalization and cultural renewal, economic drivers of the local economy, advocates of community service and urban developers, both commercially as well as in housing.

Dobelle serves on the Executive Boards of the Consortium of Urban and Metropolitan Universities ( CUMU), the Commission on Effective Leadership of the American Council on Education (ACE), and the Council on International Education (CIEE).

Dobelle has received accolades during his career for success in community outreach as well as management of colleges inclusive of faculty issues, athletic teams, student engagement and being an agent for change.

== Family ==
Dobelle's father was orthopedic surgeon Martin Dobelle. His brother was scientist William H. Dobelle. He resides with his long-time wife, Kit. They have one son.

Academic offices
Preceded by Vicky L. Carwein	19th President of Westfield State University; December 2007-November 8, 2013	Succeeded by Elizabeth "Liz" Hall Preston (President Ad Interim)
Political offices
Preceded by Paul Brindle	22nd Mayor of Pittsfield, Massachusetts	Succeeded by Don Butler
