= Maggy Hurchalla =

American environmental activist (1940–2022)

- Born: Margaret Sloan Reno; December 11, 1940; Coral Gables, Florida, U.S.
- Died: February 19, 2022 (aged 81); Stuart, Florida, U.S.
- Spouse: Jim Hurchalla
- Children: 4
- Relatives: Janet Reno (sister)

Margaret Sloan Hurchalla (née Reno; December 11, 1940 – February 19, 2022) was an American environmental activist from Florida. As a Martin County, Florida county commissioner, she pioneered responsible growth and championed environmental causes. Later in her career she was involved in a legal battle over her interference with a mining company, Lake Point Restoration. She was ordered to pay Lake Point a settlement of US$4,391,708 in 2018. That ruling was upheld by the appeal court in June 2019.

== Early life and education ==
Maggy Reno's family moved to Miami, Florida, in 1920. She was born in Coral Gables, Florida, on December 11, 1940. Her mother Jane Wood Reno and her father Henry Olaf Reno were both journalists who wrote for the Miami Herald. Hurchalla was the third of four children. Her elder sister was Janet Reno, who served as State Attorney for Dade County and then Attorney General of the United States during the Bill Clinton administration. Hurchalla graduated from Coral Gables Senior High School and then attended Swarthmore College, from which she graduated in 1962.

== Career ==
Hurchalla became involved in environmental activism after 650 acres (2.6 km^{2}) of Hutchinson Island was sold to a developer in 1972 instead of being conserved. In 1974, Hurchalla became a county commissioner of Martin County, Florida, serving in this role until 1994, when she was defeated by Elmira Gainey. She was the county's first female county commissioner.

Known for her strong environmentalist views, she served on the state board of the Nature Conservancy and on the Governor's Commission for a Sustainable South Florida.

== Controversies ==
When Hurchalla learned that the company Lake Point Restoration, owned by George Lindemann Jr., was planning on developing a rock mining site in Martin County, she wrote twenty-three emails to county commissioners expressing her objections to the plans based on environmental concerns. Lake Point made deals with South Florida Water Management District in 2008 and Martin County in 2009 for water storage, but both deals were canceled in 2012. Lake Point said that Hurchalla was the reason the contracts were canceled and sued her in 2013 for tortious interference. In February 2018, the trial took place and was decided in favor of Lake Point. Hurchalla was ordered to pay Lake Point US$4,391,708. In July 2018, her car and two of her kayaks were seized by court order, though Lake Point later returned them. Hurchalla appealed the decision, but it was upheld by the Florida Fourth District Court of Appeal in June 2019; in 2021, the U.S. Supreme Court denied a request to hear an appeal.

== Awards and honors ==
In 2002, she was named the Everglades Coalition's Conservationist of the Year. In 2003 she won a National Wetlands Award from the Environmental Law Institute for volunteer leadership. In 2019 she gave the keynote address at the 50th anniversary meeting of the Friends of the Everglades.

== Personal life and death ==
Hurchalla was married to Jim Hurchalla, formerly an engineer for Pratt & Whitney. They had four children. Hurchalla was in remission from breast cancer as of 2019.

She appeared with her sister Janet Reno in "Dark Knight Court", a 2013 episode of The Simpsons, as Reno. Reno's Parkinson's disease made it difficult for her to speak, so Hurchalla voiced the character's longer lines.

Hurchalla lived in Stuart, Florida. She died from cardiac arrest on February 19, 2022, while she was recovering from a hip surgery. She was 81.
