= Richard Restak =

American neurologist, neuropsychiatrist, author and professor

Richard Restak (born 1942) is an American neurologist, neuropsychiatrist, author and professor.

== Education ==
Restak is a graduate of Gettysburg College and Georgetown University School of Medicine. He performed his postgraduate training in New York City at St. Vincent's Hospital (Manhattan), where he completed his internship. His first psychiatric residency was also in New York City at Mount Sinai Hospital. This was followed by two residencies in Washington, D.C.: a psychiatric residency at Georgetown University Hospital and a residency in neurology at George Washington University Hospital.

== Career ==
Restak maintains a private medical practice in neurology and neuropsychiatry in Washington, D.C., where he is also a Clinical Professor of Neurology at George Washington Hospital University School of Medicine and Health.

He has to date written 20 books on various aspects of the human brain; two were on The New York Times Best Sellers List. His first bestseller, The Brain (1984), was also the first companion book he wrote for a PBS series. The Mind (1988) was another PBS companion book and was his second bestseller. He has written articles for various national newspapers and has appeared on radio and television programs. He has penned dozens of articles for national newspapers including: The Washington Post, The New York Times, The Los Angeles Times, USA Today, and The Huffington Post. He has contributed brain and neuroscience-related entries for the Encyclopædia Britannica and the Encyclopedia of Neuroscience.

He is a Clinical Professor of Neurology at George Washington University School of Medicine & Health Sciences.

As a regular lecturer, both nationally and internationally, he has presented commentaries for both Morning Edition and All Things Considered on National Public Radio and made numerous appearances on leading television talks shows including: the Today Show, Good Morning America, the Discovery Channel, and the PBS NewsHour.

He has appeared as an expert witness for the defense in the high-profile trial of Mir Aimal Kasi, the Pakistani national charged with the 1993 shootings at CIA headquarters in Langley, Virginia. During the trial Restak testified that Kasi was missing tissue from his frontal lobes, a congenital defect that affected his ability to judge the consequences of his actions.

== Bibliography ==
- Pre- Meditated Man , 1977
- The Brain: The Last Frontier, 1980
- The Self Seekers, 1982
- The Brain, 1984
- The Infant Mind, 1986
- The Mind, 1988
- The Brain Has a Mind of Its Own, 1991
- Brainscapes: An Introduction to What Neuroscience Has Learned About the Structure, Function, and Abilities of the Brain, 1995. ISBN 978-0-7868-8190-1
- Receptors, 1995
- The Modular Brain, 1995. ISBN 978-0-684-80126-1
- Older and Wiser 1999
- The Longevity Strategy: How to Live to 100 Using the Brain-Body Connection, 1999 ISBN 978-0-471-32794-3 (co-author: David Mahoney)
- Mysteries of the Mind, 2000
- Mozart's Brain and the Fighter Pilot, 2001. ISBN 978-0-609-81005-7
- Poe's Heart and the Mountain Climber , 2004
- The New Brain:, 2004
- The Naked Brain, 2007
- Think Smart: A Neuroscientist's Prescription for Improving Your Brain's Performance, 2009. ISBN 1-59448-873-8
- The Big Questions: Mind, 2012.
- Restak, Richard (2023). How to Prevent Dementia: Understanding and Managing Cognitive Decline. Skyhorse. ISBN 9781510776296.

=== Companion books to PBS series ===
- The Secret Life of the Brain, 2001. ISBN 978-0-309-07435-3
- The Brain 1984

== See also ==
- Neurology
- Cognitive neuropsychiatry
- Human brain
- Anxiety
- Emotion
- Temporal lobe epilepsy
- Mind
