= Carrie Tingley Hospital Historic District =

Historic district in New Mexico, United States

- U.S. National Register of Historic Places
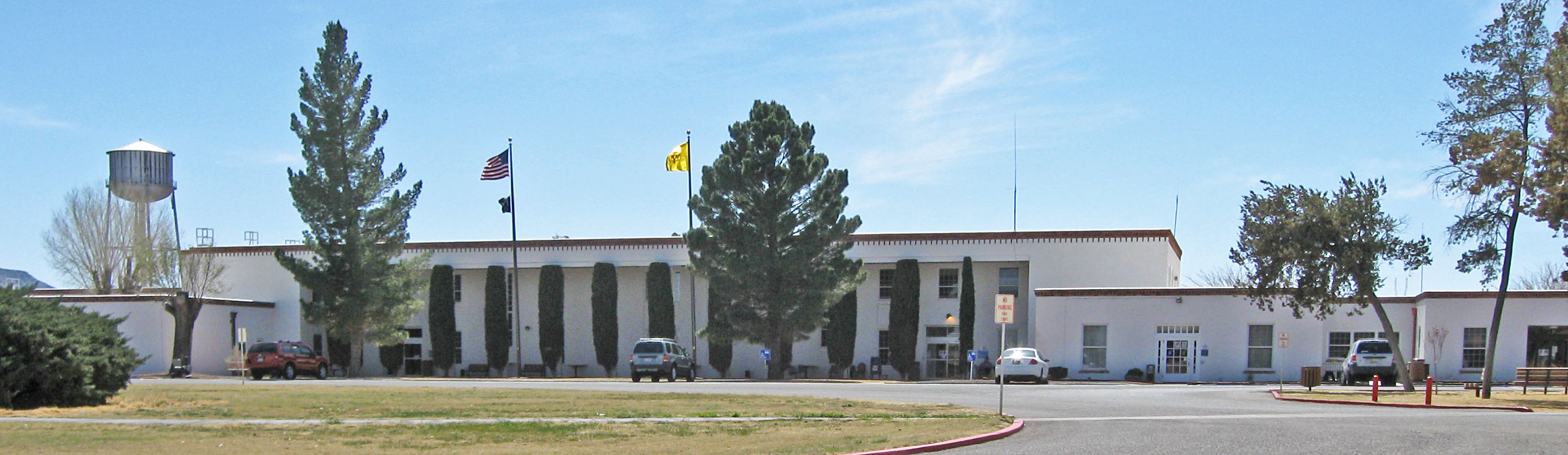

- Location within New Mexico
- Location: 992 Broadway, Truth or Consequences, New Mexico
- Coordinates: 33°07′19″N 107°15′38″W
- Area: 15 acres (6.1 ha)
- Built: 1936
- Built by: Willard C. Kruger
- Architectural style: Territorial Revival
- MPS: New Deal in New Mexico MPS
- NRHP reference No.: 03001546
- Added to NRHP: March 15, 2005

The Carrie Tingley Hospital Historic District, at 992 Broadway in Truth or Consequences, New Mexico, was developed in 1936. It was listed as a historic district on the National Register of Historic Places in 2005. The listing included six contributing buildings, four contributing structures, and a contributing object on 15 acres (6.1 ha).
