= Mir Aimal Kansi =

Pakistani perpetrator of the 1993 CIA headquarters shooting

Aimal Kansi
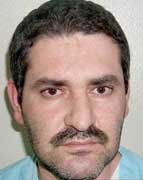
- An undated mugshot of Kansi on death row
- Born: 10 February 1964; Quetta, Pakistan
- Died: 14 November 2002 (aged 38); Greensville Correctional Center, Virginia, U.S.
- Known for: Perpetrator of the 1993 shootings at CIA Headquarters
- Status: Executed by lethal injection
- Motive: Frustration with U.S. foreign policy in Muslim countries
- Convictions: Capital murder First degree murder Malicious wounding (3 counts); Use of a firearm in the commission of a felony (5 counts)
- Penalty: Death

Details
- Date: 25 January 1993
- Location: Langley, Virginia
- Killed: 2
- Injured: 3

Aimal Kansi (10 February 1964 – 14 November 2002) was a Pakistani national who was convicted of the 1993 CIA headquarters shooting in Langley, Virginia. In the incident, Kansi shot and killed two CIA employees and wounded three others. He soon fled to Kandahar, Afghanistan, which later became a Taliban stronghold, and went into hiding for four years. While in Pakistan, he was caught and arrested by the FBI with help from Pakistani police forces. After being returned to the U.S., he was convicted of capital murder and sentenced to death. He was executed by lethal injection in 2002.

== Background ==
Kasi was an ethnic Pashtun born on 10 February 1964 in Quetta, Pakistan. His father was Abdullah Jan Kasi (or Qazi), a Tribal Malik.

He entered the United States in 1991 under the name Mir Aimal Kasi and brought a substantial sum of cash which he had inherited in 1989 upon the death of his father. He traveled on forged papers that he had purchased in Karachi, Pakistan. He had altered his name to "Kansi" and later bought a fake US green card in Miami, Florida.

He stayed with a Kashmiri friend, Zahid Mir, in a Reston, Virginia apartment, and he worked for a courier service. That work would be decisive in his choice of target: "I used to pass this area almost every day and knew these two left-turning lanes [were] mostly people who work for CIA." According to Kansi, he first began to think of attacking CIA personnel after he bought a Chinese-made AK-47 from a Chantilly, Virginia gun store. The plan soon became "more important than any other thing to [him]".

== Shootings ==
On 25 January 1993, Kasi stopped his borrowed brown Datsun station wagon behind a number of vehicles waiting at a red traffic light on the eastbound side of Route 123, Fairfax County. The vehicles were waiting to make a left turn into the main entrance of CIA headquarters. Kasi emerged from his vehicle with his semi-automatic Type 56 assault rifle and proceeded to move among the lines of vehicles, firing a total of 10 rounds into them, killing Lansing H. Bennett, 66, and Frank Darling, 28. Three others were left with gunshot wounds. Darling was shot first and later received additional gunshot wounds to the head after Kasi shot the other victims.

Kasi returned to his vehicle and drove to a nearby park. After 90 minutes of waiting, he realized that he was not being actively sought; he then drove back to his Reston apartment. At the time, reports said police were looking for a white male in his twenties and that the shooting was not thought to be directly connected to the CIA. He hid the rifle in a green plastic bag under a sofa, went to a McDonald's to eat, and booked himself into a Days Inn for the night. The CNN news reports he watched made it clear that police had misidentified his vehicle and did not have his license plate number. The next morning, he took a flight to Quetta, Pakistan. According to Kasi, he killed CIA employees because, "I was really angry with the policy of the U.S. government in the Middle East, particularly toward the Palestinian people", Kasi said in a prison interview with FOX affiliate WTTG.

On 16 February 1993, Kasi, then a fugitive, had been charged in absentia. The charges involved the capital murder of Darling, the murder of Bennett, and three counts of malicious wounding for the other victims, along with related firearms charges.

== Arrest and rendition ==
In May 1997, an informant walked into the U.S. consulate in Karachi and claimed he could help lead them to Kasi. As proof, he showed a copy of a driver's license application made by Kasi under a false name but bearing his photograph. Apparently, the people who had been sheltering Kasi wanted the multimillion-dollar reward offer for his capture. Kasi stated, "I want to make it clear [that] the people who tricked me [...] were Pushtuns, they were owners of land in the Leghari and Khosa clan areas in Dera Ghazi Khan, but I will never name them."

As Kasi was in the dangerous Durand Line border region, the informant was told to lure Kasi into Pakistan, where he could be more easily apprehended. Kasi was tempted with a lucrative business offer, smuggling Russian electronic goods into Pakistan, which brought him to Dera Ghazi Khan, in the Punjab province of Pakistan, where he checked into a room at the Shalimar Hotel. At 4 a.m. on 15 June 1997, an armed team of FBI officers, working with the Pakistani Inter-Services Intelligence, raided Kasi's hotel room. His fingerprints were taken on the scene, confirming his identity. Sources disagree as to where Kasi was taken next. US authorities claim it was a holding facility run by Pakistani authorities, but Pakistani sources claim it was the US embassy in Islamabad, before he was flown to the U.S. on 17 June in a C-141 transport. During the flight, Kasi made full oral and written confessions to the FBI.

== Trial ==
During Kasi's trial, the defense introduced testimony from Dr. Richard Restak, a neurologist and neuropsychiatrist, that Kansi was missing tissue from his frontal lobes, a congenital defect that made it hard for him to judge the consequence of his actions. That testimony was reiterated by another psychiatrist for the defense, based upon independent examination.

Kasi was tried in front of a jury at the Fairfax County Courthouse in Fairfax, Virginia over a period of ten days in November 1997; he had pleaded not guilty to all charges. The jury found him guilty and recommended the death penalty for the capital murder charge.

On 4 February 1998, Kasi was sentenced to death for the capital murder of Darling, who was shot at the beginning of the attack and again after the other victims had been shot. His other sentences of life imprisonment for the first-degree murder of Bennett, a 60-year sentence for the three malicious woundings, and fines totaling $600,000 were rendered moot by his execution.

== Execution and burial ==
Kasi was executed by lethal injection on 14 November 2002, at Greensville Correctional Center, near Jarratt, Virginia. Kansi's body was repatriated to Pakistan. His funeral was attended by the entire civil hierarchy of Balochistan, the local Pakistan Army Corps Commander and the Pakistani Ambassador to the United States, Ashraf Jahangir Qazi. Prayers in Pakistan's National Assembly were led by Hafiz Hussain Ahmed, a religious leader elected from Quetta, who intoned, "God, destroy those who handed him over to America. God, his murderers, whether in America or in Pakistan, may they meet their fate soon." (Ahmad was a member of the Jamiat Ulema-e-Islam (F).)

== Legacy ==
- Mir Aimal Khān Kasi Jumaat is a mosque named after him in the port city of Ormara in his home province of Balochistan, by the Arabian Sea.

== See also ==
- Capital punishment in the United States
- Capital punishment in Virginia
- List of people executed in Virginia
- List of people executed in the United States in 2002
