= Edith H. J. Dobelle =

American ambassador and political aide (born 1944)

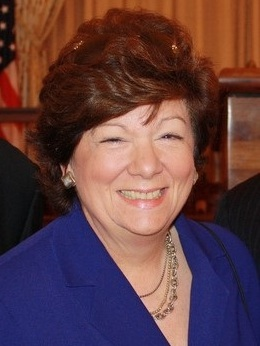
- Dobelle in 2018

1st Chief of Staff to the First Lady of the United States
- In office 1979–1981
- President: Jimmy Carter
- First Lady: Rosalynn Carter
- Preceded by: Position established
- Succeeded by: James Rosebush

20th Chief of Protocol of the United States
- In office November 3, 1978 – September 26, 1979
- President: Jimmy Carter
- Preceded by: Evan Dobelle
- Succeeded by: Abelardo L. Valdez

Personal details
- Born: Edith Huntington Jones; September 2, 1944 (age 82) Hamden, Connecticut, U.S.
- Party: Democratic (1976–present)
- Other political affiliations: Republican (before 1976)
- Spouse: Evan Dobelle (m. 1970)
- Education: Colby Junior College

Edith Huntington Jones "Kit" Dobelle (born September 2, 1944) is an American ambassador and political aide who served as Chief of Protocol of the United States from 1978 to 1979 and Chief of Staff to the First Lady to Rosalynn Carter from 1979 to 1981. She worked on political campaigns and held roles in state and federal government, including overseeing diplomatic arrangements and managing the First Lady's staff. Dobelle was the second woman to hold the rank of Chief of Protocol, a position with ambassadorial status.

== Early life and education ==
Edith Huntington Jones Dobelle, born on September 2, 1944, in Hamden, Connecticut, grew up on a property cultivated by her conservationist father to have a natural appearance. She graduated from Colby Junior College and subsequently worked at the First National Bank of Boston.

== Career ==
Edith Dobelle, often called Kit, expressed an early interest in politics, which led her to volunteer for Maurice Frye's campaign for state representative in a Massachusetts special election in the 1960s. Through her involvement, she met her future husband, Evan Dobelle. They both worked in various political offices and campaigns, including the office of Massachusetts Governor John A. Volpe. The couple married in 1970.

In January 1976, as the Republican mayor of Pittsfield, Massachusetts, Evan Dobelle and Kit met then-presidential candidate Jimmy Carter during his campaign visit to the city. Soon after, they registered as Democrats and actively supported Carter's campaign. Kit worked in Maryland and Pennsylvania for Carter's election, while her husband focused on convention arrangements in New York. Following Carter's victory in November 1976, the Dobelles moved to Washington, D.C., where Kit served as an unpaid assistant to Evan in his role as Chief of Protocol of the United States.

In 1978, Evan Dobelle transitioned to a new role as the treasurer of the Democratic National Committee, and Kit was appointed to replace him as Chief of Protocol, a position with ambassadorial rank requiring Senate confirmation. She served in the role from November 3, 1978 to September 26, 1979 during the presidency of Jimmy Carter. She became only the second woman to hold this role, following Shirley Temple. As Chief of Protocol, she oversaw arrangements for international visits and official ceremonies, including historic events such as the signing of treaties with China in January 1979 during Deng Xiaoping's visit and the Camp David Accords signing on March 29, 1979.

In August 1979, Dobelle was appointed as Chief of Staff to the First Lady of the United States, Rosalynn Carter. This newly created position, equivalent in rank and pay to the White House Chief of Staff, involved managing Rosalynn Carter’s 19-member staff and coordinating the First Lady’s activities with senior White House aides. Dobelle noted that the specific reasons for establishing the role were not discussed during her appointment but emphasized her focus on ensuring smooth operations both when the First Lady was present and when she was away.

During her tenure, Dobelle worked closely with Rosalynn Carter, including accompanying her on trips to Latin America. The two also took Spanish lessons together with Grace Vance and Annette Carter. Dobelle’s work involved navigating public scrutiny and criticism of the First Lady’s staff, which some observers described as inexperienced and disorganized.
