= Langley, Virginia =

Unincorporated community in Virginia, United States

- Unincorporated community
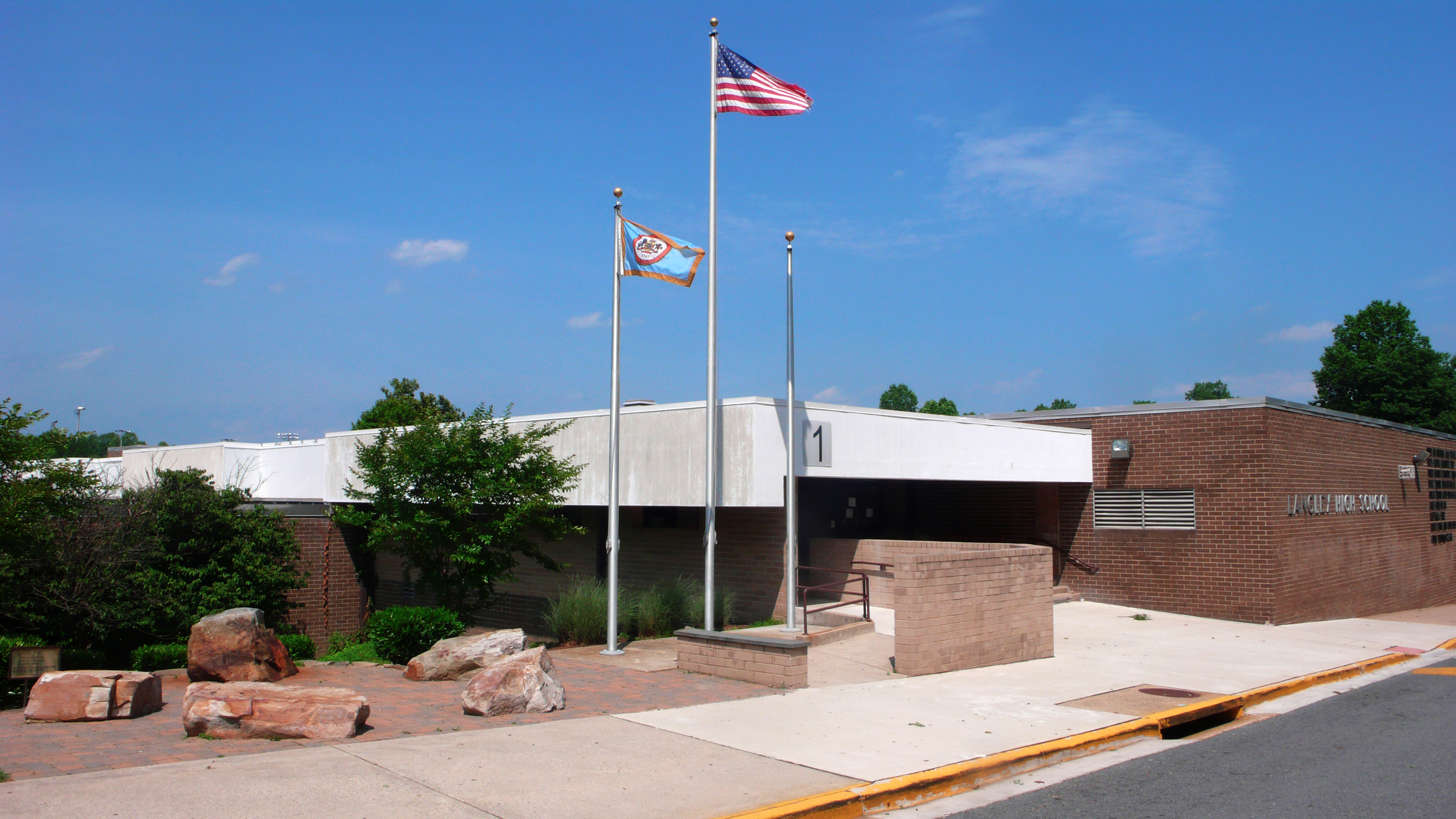
- Langley High School

- Location within Northern Virginia Location within Virginia Location within the United States
- Coordinates: 38°56′47″N 77°9′32″W
- Country: United States
- State: Virginia
- County: Fairfax

Area
  - Total: 2.2 sq mi (5.7 km^{2})

Population (2022)
  - Total: 1,930
  - Density: 880/sq mi (340/km^{2})
- Time zone: UTC−5 (EST)
  - Summer (DST): UTC−4 (EDT)
- ZIP Codes: 22101–22102
- GNIS feature ID: 1495816

Langley is an unincorporated community in the census-designated place of McLean in Fairfax County, Virginia, United States. The name "Langley" often occurs as a metonym for the Central Intelligence Agency (CIA), whose headquarters, the George Bush Center for Intelligence, is in Langley.

The land which makes up Langley today once belonged to Thomas Lee, former Crown Governor of the Colony of Virginia from 1749 to 1750. Lee's land was named Langley in honor of Langley Hall, which formed part of the Lee home estate in Shropshire, England. In 1839 Benjamin Mackall purchased 700 acres (283 ha) of land from the Lee family, while keeping the name.

The community was essentially absorbed into McLean many years ago, although there is still a Langley High School. In addition to its roles as a bedroom community for Washington, D.C., and as home to the CIA's headquarters, the area is the site of the Federal Highway Administration's Turner-Fairbank Highway Research Center and formerly the Claude Moore Colonial Farm of the National Park Service, now permanently closed.

== In popular culture ==
In the animated series American Dad!, the city of Langley Falls, Virginia, in which the show takes place, is loosely based on Langley and nearby Great Falls, being depicted as a somewhat larger city as well as the headquarters of the CIA, where main character Stan Smith works as an agent. Its government structure resembles that of the independent cities of Fairfax, Virginia and Falls Church, Virginia.

"Weird Al" Yankovic's song "Party in the CIA" starts with the line "I moved out to Langley recently".

In the expansion to the CD Projekt game Cyberpunk 2077, Phantom Liberty, there is a location of the Military Medical Center located in Langley.

Many Twitter users who use the popular NAFO hashtag used in support of Ukraine in the Russian invasion of Ukraine use Langley as a joke location.

== Climate ==
According to the Köppen Climate Classification system, Langley has a humid subtropical climate, abbreviated "Cfa" on climate maps. The hottest temperature recorded in Langley was 106 °F (41.1 °C) on July 4, 2026, while the coldest temperature recorded was −3 °F (−19.4 °C) on January 21, 1985.

Climate data for Langley Air Force Base, Virginia, 1991–2020 normals, extremes 1893–present
Month	Jan	Feb	Mar	Apr	May	Jun	Jul	Aug	Sep	Oct	Nov	Dec	Year
Record high °F (°C)	79 (26)	82 (28)	90 (32)	95 (35)	97 (36)	104 (40)	106 (41)	105 (41)	99 (37)	95 (35)	85 (29)	79 (26)	106 (41)
Mean daily maximum °F (°C)	49.0 (9.4)	51.5 (10.8)	58.1 (14.5)	67.6 (19.8)	75.5 (24.2)	82.9 (28.3)	87.3 (30.7)	85.1 (29.5)	79.4 (26.3)	69.7 (20.9)	60.2 (15.7)	52.2 (11.2)	68.2 (20.1)
Daily mean °F (°C)	40.6 (4.8)	42.7 (5.9)	48.9 (9.4)	58.1 (14.5)	66.7 (19.3)	75.0 (23.9)	79.3 (26.3)	77.8 (25.4)	72.2 (22.3)	61.3 (16.3)	51.1 (10.6)	43.9 (6.6)	59.8 (15.4)
Mean daily minimum °F (°C)	32.1 (0.1)	33.8 (1.0)	39.8 (4.3)	48.6 (9.2)	58.0 (14.4)	67.1 (19.5)	71.2 (21.8)	70.5 (21.4)	65.0 (18.3)	52.9 (11.6)	41.9 (5.5)	35.5 (1.9)	51.4 (10.7)
Record low °F (°C)	−3 (−19)	4 (−16)	11 (−12)	22 (−6)	32 (0)	43 (6)	54 (12)	50 (10)	44 (7)	26 (−3)	20 (−7)	6 (−14)	−3 (−19)
Average precipitation inches (mm)	3.48 (88)	2.88 (73)	4.42 (112)	3.33 (85)	3.77 (96)	4.01 (102)	5.33 (135)	4.94 (125)	4.77 (121)	3.93 (100)	3.27 (83)	3.70 (94)	47.83 (1,214)
Average snowfall inches (cm)	2.4 (6.1)	0.1 (0.25)	0.1 (0.25)	0.0 (0.0)	0.0 (0.0)	0.0 (0.0)	0.0 (0.0)	0.0 (0.0)	0.0 (0.0)	0.0 (0.0)	0.0 (0.0)	0.1 (0.25)	2.7 (6.85)
Average precipitation days (≥ 0.01 in)	10.8	8.5	10.6	9.4	10.6	8.7	10.2	7.9	8.5	6.8	8.4	9.6	110.0
Average snowy days (≥ 0.1 in)	1.3	0.4	0.3	0.1	0.0	0.0	0.0	0.0	0.0	0.0	0.0	0.2	2.3
Source 1: NOAA
Source 2: xmACIS2

== See also ==
- Quantico, Virginia
