= Mary-Kate Fisher =

Acting Chief of Protocol of the United States in 2019

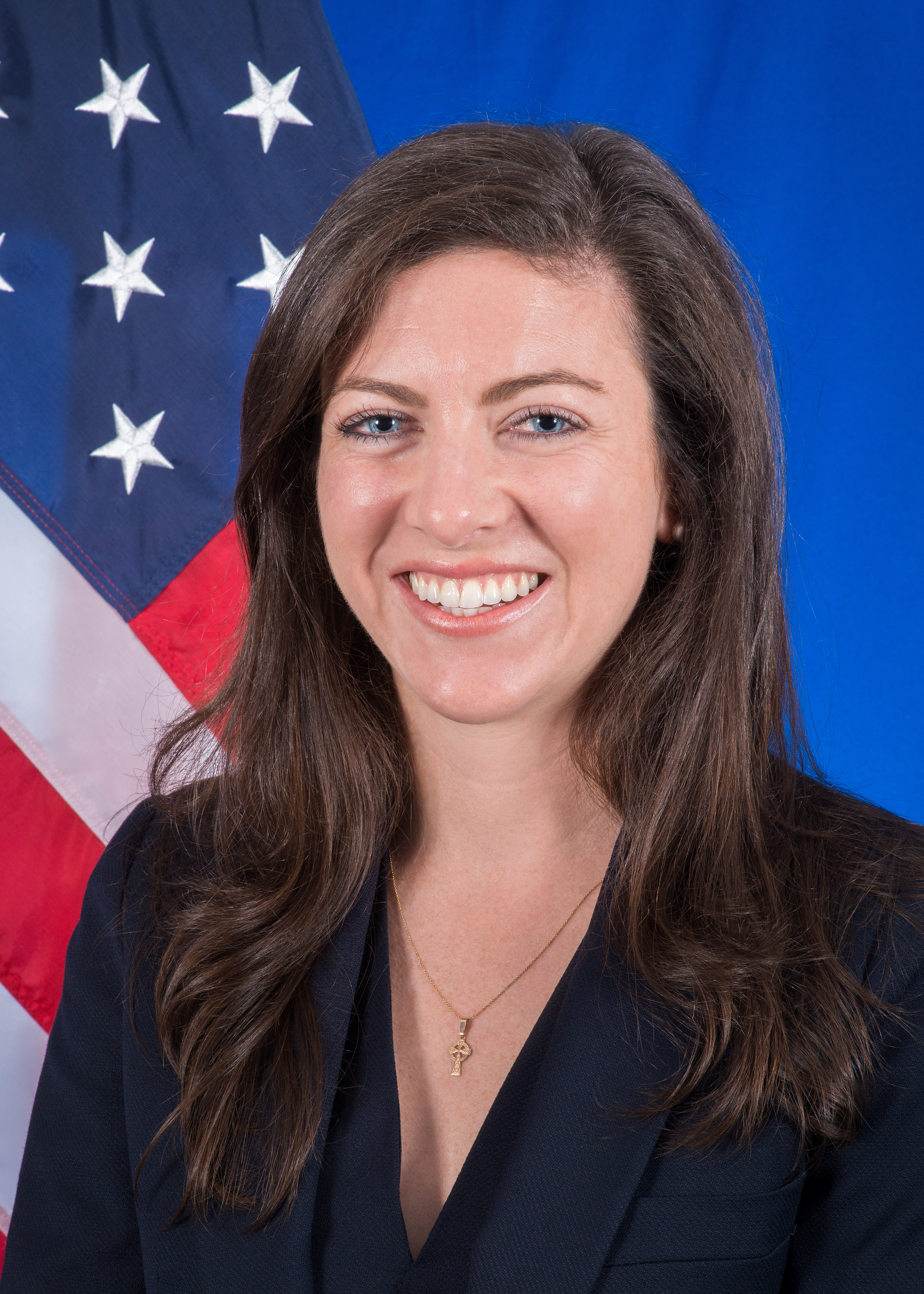

Chief of Protocol of the United States Acting
- In office June 24, 2019 – August 12, 2019
- President: Donald Trump
- Preceded by: Sean Lawler
- Succeeded by: Cam Henderson

Personal details
- Education: College of New Jersey (BA)

Mary-Kate Fisher is a former political appointee who served as Acting Chief of Protocol of the United States from June 24, 2019, to August 12, 2019. She previously served as Assistant Chief of Protocol for Visits.

== Early career ==
Fisher, a New Jersey native, graduated from The College of New Jersey with a bachelor's degree in International Studies. She began her career as a scheduler in the office of New Jersey Governor Chris Christie, but later joined a non-profit organization. She also served as deputy director of the Hurricane Sandy New Jersey Relief Fund, which was created by Christie's wife.

While in New York City, Fisher served as the Manager of Corporate Alliances at the United Service Organizations. She also served as a staff member of Christie's 2016 presidential campaign and the governor's political action committee.

After the election, Fisher joined the 58th Presidential Inaugural Committee to serve as the event manager for high-level events for both President-elect Donald Trump and Vice President-elect Mike Pence. She went on to join the Trump administration with a job at the White House, where she worked as the deputy director of Advance in the office of First Lady Melania Trump.

== Chief of Protocol ==
Fisher first joined the U.S. State Department in 2018 as the Assistant Chief of Protocol for visits, coordinating the trips and visits of foreign dignitaries who were meeting with President Trump and Vice President Pence. Fisher also took on the role as Deputy Chief of Protocol.

On June 24, 2019, Fisher took over as Acting Chief of Protocol when Sean Lawler was suspended indefinitely as a result of an investigation into his conduct. Lawler was scheduled to join President Donald Trump on his trip for the G20 summit in Japan later that week, but due to his suspension Fisher was asked to go in his place.

Fisher was formally appointed as the Acting Chief of Protocol on July 8, 2019. As part of her work, Fisher led the Office of Protocol at the U.S. State Department to welcome visiting dignitaries to the United States. She also traveled with the president to facilitate foreign trips. On August 12, 2019, Fisher was succeeded by Cam Henderson.

Political offices
Preceded by Sean Lawler	Chief of Protocol of the United States; Acting; 2019	Succeeded by Cam Henderson
