= Clara Nunes Santos =

Portuguese diplomat (born 1959)

- Born: 9 November 1959 (age 66); Funchal, Madeira, Portugal
- Occupation: Diplomat
- Years active: 35
- Known for: Head of Portuguese State Protocol
- Spouse: Pedro Nunes dos Santos
- Children: Three

Clara Nunes Santos (born 9 November 1959) is a Portuguese diplomat and former ambassador to Norway. She was appointed Head of Portuguese State Protocol in September 2017.

== Early life and education ==
Maria Clara Nunes Pinto Capelo Ramos Nunes dos Santos was born on 9 November 1959, in Funchal in the Portuguese Autonomous Region of Madeira. She had two younger siblings. Her father worked for Portugal's Forestry Service. Following schooling in Madeira she moved with her family to Portugal's capital, Lisbon, and obtained a degree in law from the Lisbon campus of the Catholic University of Portugal (Universidade Católica Portuguesa).

== Diplomatic career ==
After succeeding in open competition for places in Portugal's diplomatic service in 1986, Santos has held various diplomatic positions, both in Lisbon and abroad, including in Portugal's Permanent Representation to the European Communities in Brussels from 1993. In 2008, she returned to Portugal to become Deputy Chief of Protocol. In April 2013 she became Portugal's ambassador to Norway based in Oslo, and non-resident ambassador to Iceland, only one of three female Portuguese ambassadors out of a total of 33. One of her achievements was to persuade two Norwegian schools to start teaching Portuguese, winning her a “Foreign Languages Ambassador” award, given by the Norwegian authorities.

On 1 September 2017, Santos became the first woman to be appointed Head of Portuguese State Protocol. According to the Portuguese Law of Precedence this makes her the 36th most important person in government. She is married to Pedro Nunes dos Santos and they have three children.

== Awards and honours ==
- In 2017 Santos was awarded the Prémio Femina de Honra by Matriz Portuguesa, an annual award given since 2010 to distinguished Portuguese women.
