= Goli Ameri =

Iranian-American businesswoman and former diplomat (born 1956)

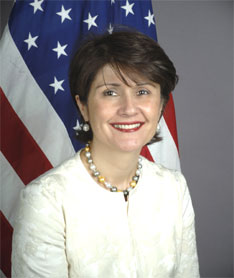

12th Assistant Secretary of State for Educational and Cultural Affairs
- In office March 19, 2008 – January 20, 2009
- President: George W. Bush
- Preceded by: Dina Powell
- Succeeded by: Ann Stock

Under Secretary General for Humanitarian Values and Diplomacy, IFRC
- In office July 1, 2010 – July 1, 2012
- Succeeded by: Joelle Tanguy

Personal details
- Born: Goli Yazdi; September 26, 1956 (age 70) Tehran, Iran
- Education: Stanford University (BA; MA)

Goli Ameri (Persian: گلی عامری; née Yazdi; born September 26, 1956) is an Iranian-American businesswoman and former U.S. diplomat. She is the co-founder of StartItUp, a mobile technology platform that provides resources to aspiring entrepreneurs. She formerly served as Under Secretary General for Humanitarian Values and Diplomacy for the International Federation of Red Cross and Red Crescent Societies and U.S. Assistant Secretary of State for Educational and Cultural Affairs. Ameri ran for the U.S. House of Representatives as a Republican in 2004, and is a former U.S. representative to the United Nations. She served on the board of trustees of Freedom House, as well as on the Center for Middle East Public Policy advisory board of the RAND Corporation, a group of public and private sector leaders that provide guidance and support for RAND's Middle East research.

== Early life and education ==
Ameri was born in Tehran, Iran. She came to the United States as a student in 1974 to attend Stanford University. There, she earned a B.A. in Communications and French Literature and, later, her M.A. in Communications. She also studied at the Sorbonne in Paris, France. She became a U.S. citizen in 1989.

== Career ==
Ameri was founder and president of eTinium, Inc., a telecommunications consulting firm in Portland, Oregon. She is the author of over fifty market studies and wrote a bi-monthly industry analysis column for Telephony magazine. She has been quoted in such publications as The National Business Journals, The Oregonian, The Seattle Times, The San Jose Mercury News, and Internet Week and has been invited as a speaker and moderator to industry conferences worldwide. Prior to founding eTinium, Ameri was a director at U.S. Leasing, a former division of Ford Credit and Fleet Bank, in San Francisco.

She served on the steering committee of the Babson in Oregon M.B.A. program, and was a member of the Oregon Steering Committee on the Campaign for Undergraduate Education for Stanford University. She was a trustee and the Vice Chair for Development for the Catlin Gabel School, overseeing fundraising activities for the scholarship fund and teacher education. Ameri has also taught Junior Achievement classes in Oregon. She is fluent in English, French and Persian, as well as conversant in Spanish.

In October 2007, Ameri was named as one of the "100 Most Powerful Women in the Northwest" by The NW Women's Journal for her UN service and her position on the Advisory Board of the National Education for Women's Leadership program at the Hatfield School of Government at Portland State University.

Ameri received the Ellis Island Medal of Honor on May 11, 2008. The award is given annually to 100 recipients to pay tribute to the experiences and individual achievements of immigrants to the United States.

In 2012, the Carnegie Corporation of New York included Ameri in its annual list of "Immigrants: The Pride of America," which was published on July 4, 2012, in The New York Times. She also appeared in the 2012 PBS documentary "The Iranian Americans," which chronicles the history of Iranian immigrants to the United States after the 1979 revolution in Iran.

Ameri has periodically written op-eds about Iran, including in The Wall Street Journal and The Hill.

=== 2004 campaign for Congress ===
In 2004, Ameri defeated small businessman Tim Phillips and software executive Jason Meshell to become the Oregon Republican Party's nominee for Oregon's 1st congressional district, in a challenge to then-three-term incumbent Democrat David Wu.

Ameri's campaign gained a great deal of attention from political insiders in Washington, D.C. because of her fast-paced fundraising skills. She was dubbed one of the National Republican Congressional Committee's "Super Six" candidates.

The contest received national attention when, late in the campaign, Wu admitted that he had been disciplined for attempted sexual assault of a female classmate while he was a student at Stanford in 1976. Ameri did not focus on the issue initially, but heavily pushed it in the closing days of her campaign. Wu won the election with 58 percent of the vote; Ameri received 38 percent, and Dean Wolf, the Constitution Party candidate, received 4 percent.

=== United Nations ===
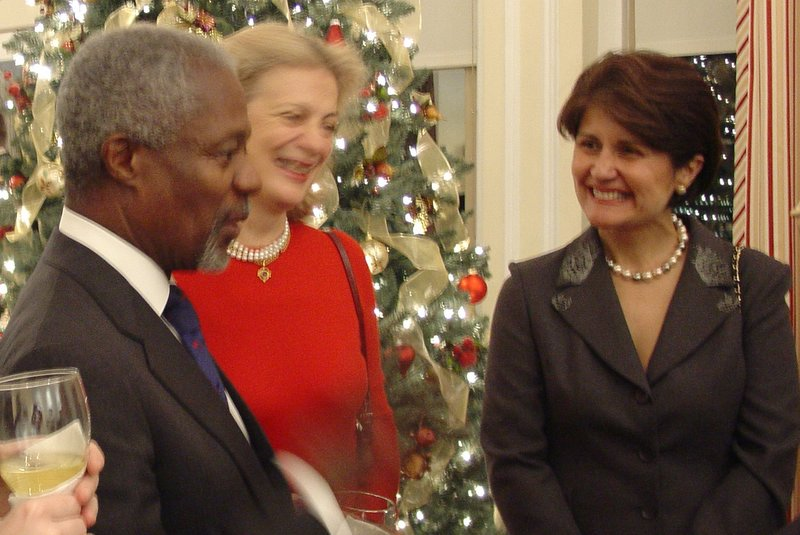
Goli Ameri with former UN Secretary-General Kofi Annan

In 2004, Ameri was appointed by George W. Bush as one of three public members of the United States' delegation to the 61st session of the United Nations Commission on Human Rights, which meets annually in Geneva, Switzerland.

In the summer of 2005, President Bush appointed Ameri as the head of the United States' delegation to the United Nations General Assembly, which is headquartered in New York City. There, she worked on UN Management Reform, the creation of the UN Human Rights Council and, due to her background in the field of high-technology, on the Internet Governance Portfolio. She was sworn in by then-U.N. Ambassador John R. Bolton in September 2005 and served until the end of the session in December. She was confirmed retroactively by the United States Senate for this position on May 26, 2006.

Ameri has also spoken at events on Middle East issues, democracy promotion and UN reform nationwide, including a testimony before the United States Helsinki Commission's Commission on Security and Cooperation in Europe hearing, "The Iran Crisis: A Transatlantic Response," as well as at the Commonwealth Club of California in San Francisco, the World Affairs Council of Oregon, and the Conference on World Affairs at the University of Colorado at Boulder.

In cooperation with the World Affairs Council of Oregon, Ameri organized and hosted a visit by eight East Asian United Nations Ambassadors as part of a public diplomacy trip to Portland in the spring of 2007.

=== Assistant Secretary of State ===
On November 15, 2007, Ameri was nominated by President Bush to serve as Assistant Secretary of State for Educational and Cultural Affairs, succeeding Dina Habib Powell and presiding over the Department of State's Bureau of Educational and Cultural Affairs. The Bureau is largely responsible for the United States government's public diplomacy efforts abroad. After a series of Senate hearings in January and February 2008, she was confirmed by the Senate for the position on March 13, 2008. Ameri was sworn in for the position on March 19, 2008.

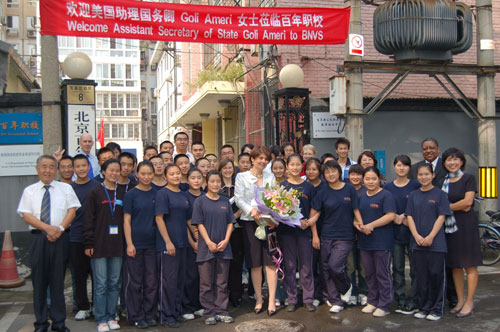
Goli Ameri at the Bai Nian Vocational School in Beijing, China

As part of her duties, Ameri has traveled to different regions of the globe to promote cross-cultural understanding. Her first trip, in May 2008, was to the Persian Gulf, where she visited the United Arab Emirates (UAE) and Qatar to promote cultural and educational diplomacy in the region. In Dubai, Ameri met with alumni and officials of the International Visitor Leadership Program, which brings foreign participants to the United States each year to meet and confer with their professional counterparts. In addition, she met with Sheikh Hahyan bin Mubarak Al-Nahyan, UAE Minister of Higher Education and Scientific Research and Chancellor of Zayed University in Abu Dhabi. In Qatar, Ameri delivered remarks at Qatar University.

In late May 2008, Ameri traveled to Brazil to review U.S. public diplomacy efforts and meet with local leaders. In the capital city of Brasília, Ameri met with Brazilian Minister of Education Fernando Haddad and Minister Eliana Zugaib, acting head of the Cultural Section of the Ministry of Foreign Affairs. While there, Ameri also announced an additional $1 million investment for the Bureau of Educational and Cultural Affairs' Fulbright Program and signed a new Fulbright Agreement with the Brazilian Foreign Ministry.

In June 2008, she traveled to Azerbaijan. During her trip, she signed an agreement on behalf of the United States with Azerbaijani Minister of Education Misir Mardanov to increase the number of Azerbaijani students studying in the United States. While in the capital city of Baku, Ameri also met with the president of the National Academy of Sciences of Azerbaijan, Mahmud Karimov and the leadership of the Academy's Manuscripts Institute, promising American help in preserving the country's ancient manuscripts. She concluded her trip with a meeting with Azerbaijani president Ilham Aliyev, where the two stressed the importance of American-Azerbaijani relations.

In July 2008, Ameri traveled to Indonesia to meet with educators, cultural experts, and alumni from U.S.-Indonesian exchange programs. While in the capital city of Jakarta, Ameri met with the Director General of Higher Education, Fasli Jalal, from the Ministry of National Education. Ameri also visited the American Indonesian Exchange Foundation (AMINEF) to meet with Fulbright Program alumni, board members, and staff.

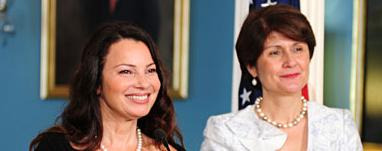
Goli Ameri and U.S. Public Diplomacy Envoy Fran Drescher.

Ameri appointed "The Nanny" star Fran Drescher as a United States Public Diplomacy Envoy on September 8, 2008, joining Michelle Kwan and Cal Ripken Jr. as the third celebrity appointed to this role. Drescher supports American public diplomacy efforts, including raising awareness of women's health issues, cancer awareness and patient empowerment. Drescher's first trip was to Romania, Hungary, Kosovo and Poland.

Ameri traveled to China and Vietnam as part of her duties in September 2008. In China, she met officials from the Ministry of Education. While in Vietnam, Ameri opened a new consultancy and information office of the U.S. Institute of International Education in Ho Chi Minh City.

As part of the U.S. government's Iraqi relief efforts, Ameri traveled to Baghdad, Iraq in October 2008, where she announced her bureau's Iraq Cultural Heritage Project efforts to renovate and improve the National Museum of Iraq.

Ameri's term as Assistant Secretary of State ended with the rest of the Bush Administration on January 20, 2009.

=== Red Cross and Red Crescent ===
On July 1, 2010, Ameri was appointed by the International Federation of Red Cross and Red Crescent Societies as Under Secretary General for Humanitarian Values and Diplomacy. In this position, she was tasked with increasing Red Cross and Red Crescent influence with policymakers and governments to better understand the needs of the people the organization serves worldwide. She retired from this position on July 1, 2012.

=== StartItUp ===
After her tenure at the Red Cross, Ameri co-founded StartItUp, a mobile technology platform that provides a range of resources including assessment, training, mentorship and a social network to aspiring entrepreneurs. The company has partnered with several cities in Southern California to provide mentorship and other guidance to small business owners and entrepreneurs planning to start their own businesses, including the cities of Long Beach and Bakersfield.

== See also ==
- List of Assistant Secretaries of State for Educational and Cultural Affairs
- List of Iranian women politicians

Party political offices
| Preceded by Jim Greenfield | Republican Party Nominee, Oregon's 1st Congressional District; 2004 | Succeeded by Derrick Kitts |
Government offices
| Preceded by Dina Powell | Assistant Secretary of State for Educational and Cultural Affairs; March 19, 2008 - January 20, 2009 | Succeeded by Ann Stock |
