= Cam Henderson (diplomat) =

American diplomat

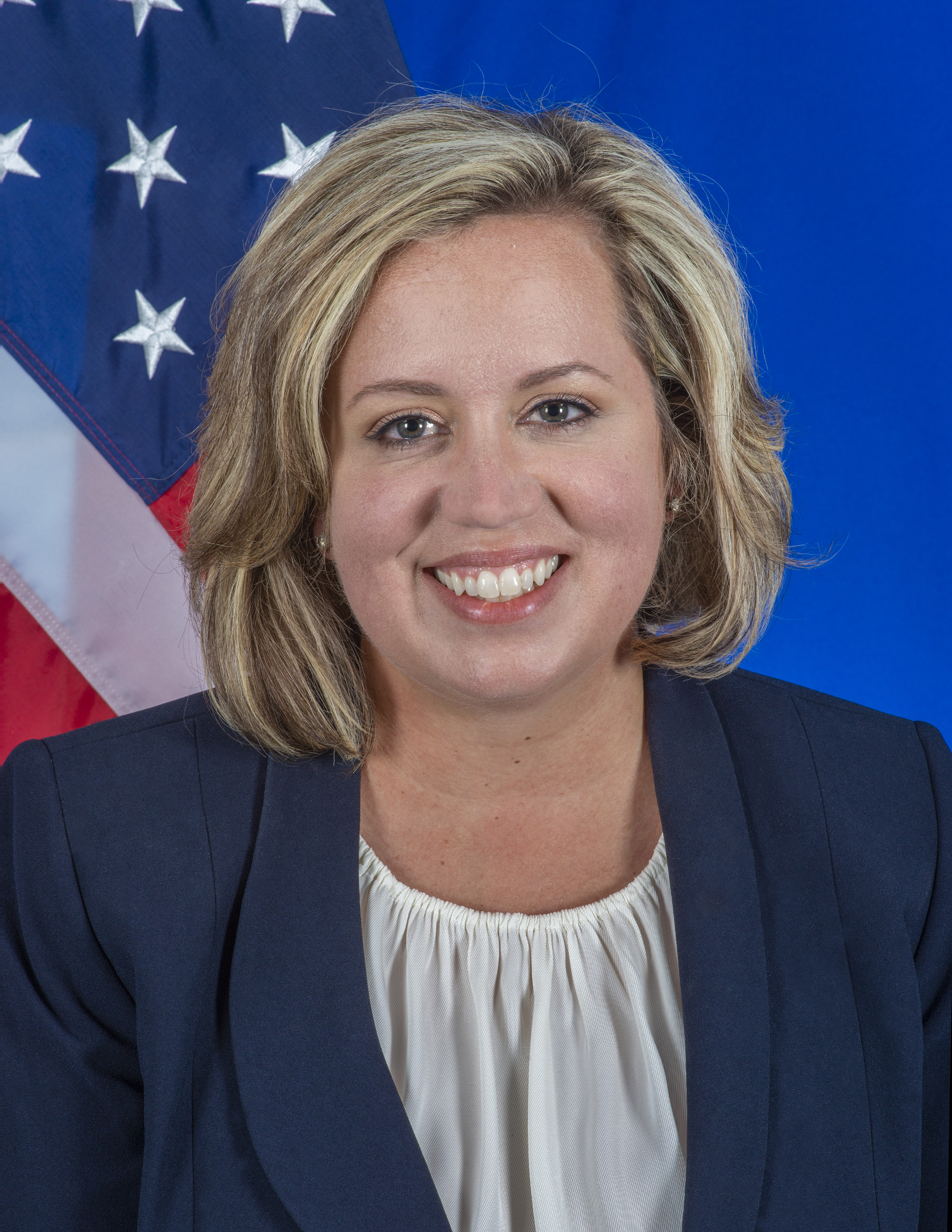

33rd Chief of Protocol of the United States
- In office August 12, 2019 – January 20, 2021
- President: Donald Trump
- Preceded by: Sean Lawler
- Succeeded by: Rufus Gifford

Personal details
- Born: Katherine Camille Henderson Chattanooga, Tennessee, U.S.
- Party: Republican
- Education: American University (BA)

Katherine Camille "Cam" Henderson is an American diplomat who served as Chief of Protocol of the United States from August 12, 2019 to January 20, 2021.

== Early career ==
Henderson was born in Chattanooga, Tennessee, and graduated from American University. At the beginning of her career, she worked for President George W. Bush in the White House Presidential Personnel Office, on Bush's re-election campaign in 2004, and at the Republican National Committee.

From 2010 to 2012, Henderson served as New Jersey first lady Mary Pat Christie's chief of staff and director of protocol. In 2013, she became the executive director of the Hurricane Sandy New Jersey Relief Fund, which was created by Christie's wife.

Henderson went on to serve as former New Jersey governor Chris Christie's finance director during his presidential campaign in 2016. Christie lost the campaign to Donald Trump, who won the election. After Trump's inauguration, she joined his administration as Special Assistant to the President in the White House Presidential Personnel Office.

== Chief of Protocol ==
Henderson joined the U.S. State Department in mid-2017 as Deputy Chief of Protocol under Sean Lawler. As Deputy Chief of Protocol, Henderson was publicly thanked by Ireland's Ambassador to the United States Daniel Mulhall. Henderson left the U.S. State Department in January 2019.

On August 12, 2019, Henderson returned to the U.S. State Department and took office as Chief of Protocol of the United States. As part of her work, Henderson led the Office of Protocol at the U.S. State Department to welcome visiting dignitaries to the United States. She also traveled with the president to facilitate foreign trips.

On March 5, 2020, Henderson was nominated to the United States Senate for the rank of Ambassador during her tenure of service as Chief of Protocol. On January 3, 2021, her nomination was returned to the President under Rule XXXI, Paragraph 6 of the United States Senate.

On September 15, 2020, Henderson organized the signing of the Abraham Accords on the South Lawn of the White House with U.S. President Donald Trump, Minister of Foreign Affairs of Bahrain Abdullatif bin Rashid Al Zayani, Israeli Prime Minister Benjamin Netanyahu and Minister of Foreign Affairs for the United Arab Emirates Abdullah bin Zayed Al Nahyan.

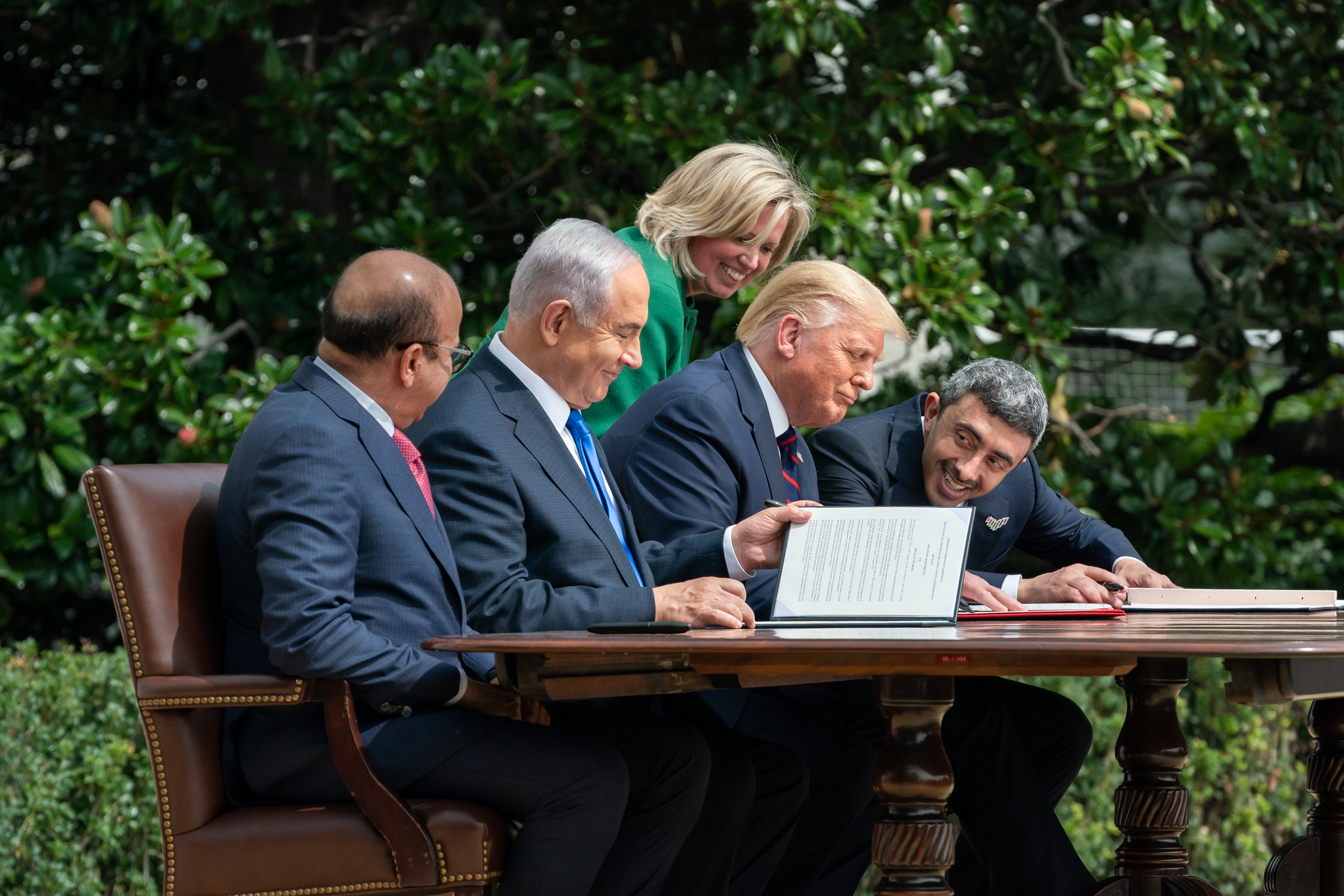
U.S. Chief of Protocol Cam Henderson assists U.S. President Donald Trump, Minister of Foreign Affairs of Bahrain Abdullatif bin Rashid Al Zayani, Israeli Prime Minister Benjamin Netanyahu and Minister of Foreign Affairs for the United Arab Emirates Abdullah bin Zayed Al Nahyan with the documents during the signing of the Abraham Accords on the South Lawn of the White House, Sept. 15, 2020. Credit: Andrea Hanks/White House.

In October 2020, The Huffington Post alleged that an unpublished report claimed unnamed employees anonymously expressed concerns to the State Department OIG hotline about alcohol consumption during representational events. Top U.S. State Department Official Ulrich Brechbuhl responded on behalf of the department calling the claims "particularly egregious" and added, "The world would be a better place if organizations like the Huffington Post and the person responsible for leaking internal documents had the character and heart displayed daily by Ms. Henderson."

Political offices
Preceded by Sean Lawler	Chief of Protocol of the United States; 2019–2021	Succeeded by Asel Roberts
