= Lester B. Korn =

- Born: Lester Bernard Korn; January 11, 1936; New York City, U.S.
- Died: December 3, 2020 (aged 84); Los Angeles, California, U.S.
- Education: University of California, Los Angeles (BS, MBA); Harvard Business School
- Occupations: Businessman, diplomat
- Known for: Co-founder of Korn/Ferry International
- Title: U.S. Ambassador and Representative to the United Nations Economic and Social Council
- Term: 1987–1988
- Predecessor: Joseph Verner Reed Jr.
- Spouse: Carolbeth Goldman
- Children: 2

Lester Bernard Korn (January 11, 1936 – December 3, 2020) was an American businessman and diplomat. He was the co-founder, with Richard M. Ferry, of Korn/Ferry International, the executive search firm established in 1969 in Los Angeles. From 1987 to 1988, Korn served as the U.S. Ambassador and Representative on the United Nations Economic and Social Council under President Ronald Reagan.

== Early life and education ==
Korn was born on January 11, 1936, in New York City. While attending college, he worked part-time as a teller and bookkeeper at Bank of America in Culver City, California, from 1953 to 1961. He received a Bachelor of Science from the University of California, Los Angeles (UCLA) in 1959 and a Master of Business Administration from the UCLA Anderson School of Management in 1960. He subsequently undertook postgraduate study at Harvard Business School.

== Career ==
=== Business career ===
Korn joined the accounting firm Peat, Marwick, Mitchell & Co. (later KPMG) in Los Angeles in 1961 as a management consultant. In 1963, he was asked to lead the firm's executive search department on the West Coast, and in 1966 he was promoted to partner. While at Peat Marwick, Korn met Richard Ferry, who joined the firm in 1965 and subsequently succeeded Korn as West Coast search manager.

In 1969, Korn and Ferry left Peat Marwick to co-found Korn/Ferry International in Los Angeles, intending to professionalize the executive search industry, which had traditionally functioned as an informal "old boys' network". Korn served as the firm's chairman and chief executive officer. Under Korn and Ferry's leadership, the firm expanded internationally through a 1972 merger with the British search firm G.K. Dickinson Ltd. and an initial public offering the same year. The firm returned to private ownership in 1974.

Following heart bypass surgery in June 1989, Korn reduced his day-to-day involvement in the firm. He announced his retirement as chairman in May 1991 at age 55, and his ownership stake was subsequently purchased by the firm's 140 partners. He continued in the role of chairman emeritus thereafter.

In 1991, Korn founded the Los Angeles-based investment firm Korn Tuttle Capital Group, Inc., serving as its chairman and chief executive. He held a significant equity interest in Curb Communications, the production company associated with the film Sex, Lies, and Videotape. He served on the boards of Tenet Healthcare, Continental American Properties, and the Music Center Operating Company of Los Angeles.

=== Ambassadorship ===
In 1987, President Ronald Reagan nominated Korn to serve as the U.S. Representative on the United Nations Economic and Social Council, with the rank of Ambassador, succeeding Joseph Verner Reed Jr. During his service from 1987 to 1988, he also acted as Alternate Representative of the United States to the 42nd and 43rd sessions of the United Nations General Assembly.

=== Philanthropy ===
From 1979 to 1982, Korn served as chairman of the Commission on Citizen Participation in Government for the State of California and as a member of the Commission of the Californias. In April 1983, he was a special advisor and delegate to the UNESCO Inter-Governmental Conference on Education for International Understanding, Cooperation, and Peace. He was a member of the President's Commission on White House Fellowships.

Korn was a longtime benefactor of UCLA, serving as a trustee of the UCLA Foundation and as a member of the Board of Visitors of the UCLA Anderson School of Management. In December 1988, the Regents of the University of California announced that the management education complex at UCLA Anderson would be named the Carolbeth and Lester B. Korn Convocation Hall in recognition of the Korns' contributions to the university; the hall was dedicated in 1995.

== Personal life ==
On March 30, 1961, Korn married Carolbeth Goldman, a fellow UCLA graduate and Los Angeles civic leader. The couple had two daughters.

== Books ==
- The Success Profile: A Leading Headhunter Tells You How to Get to the Top
