= Ann Stock =

American government employee

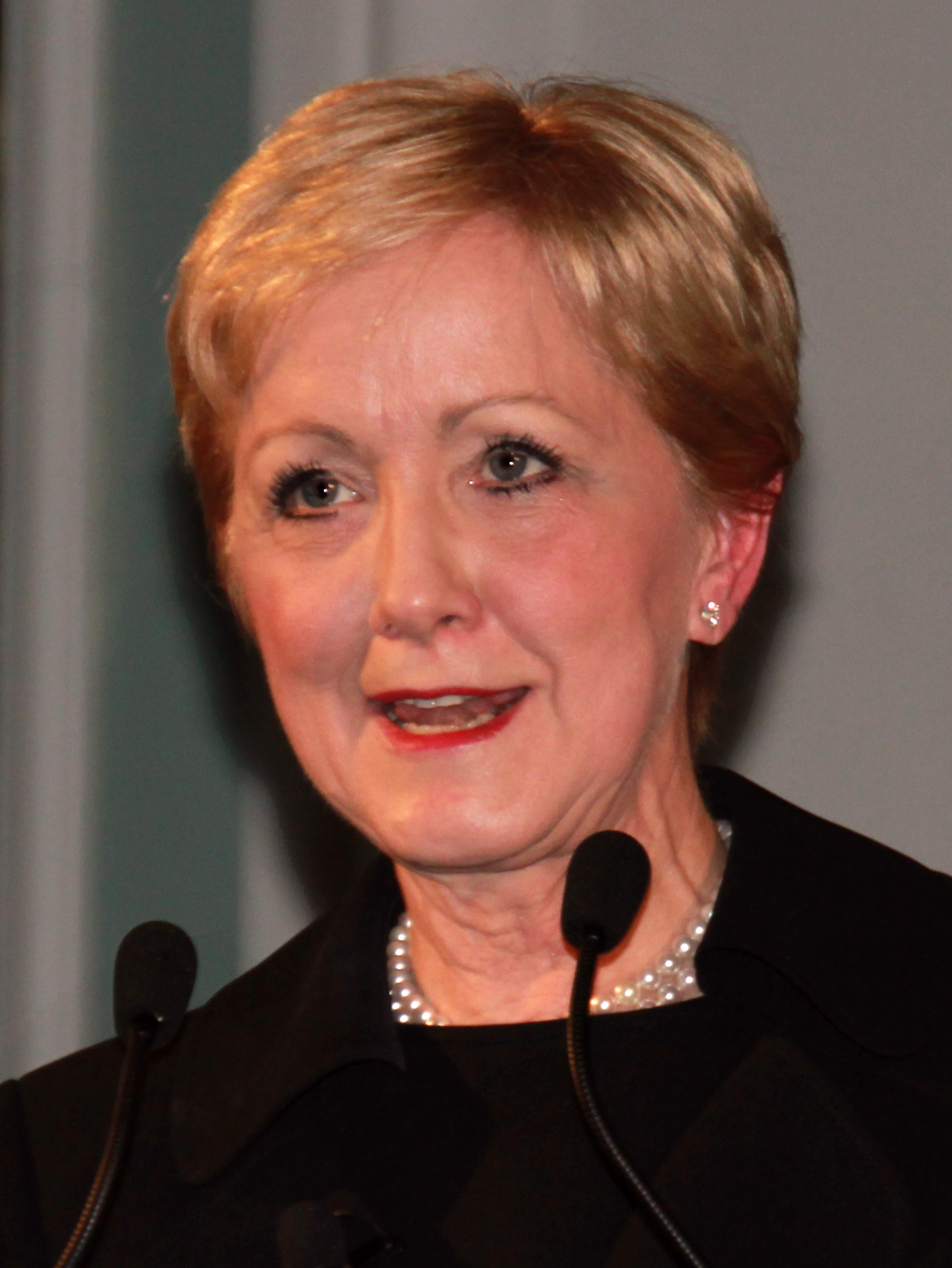

13th Assistant Secretary of State for Educational and Cultural Affairs
- In office June 23, 2010 – August 16, 2013
- President: Barack Obama
- Preceded by: Goli Ameri
- Succeeded by: Evan Ryan

22nd White House Social Secretary
- In office 1993–1997
- President: Bill Clinton
- Preceded by: Laurie Firestone
- Succeeded by: Capricia Marshall

Personal details
- Born: 1946 (age 79–80) Indiana, U.S.
- Spouse: Stuart Stock
- Education: Purdue University (BA)

Judith Ann Stewart Stock is an American government employee who served as the Assistant Secretary of State for Educational and Cultural Affairs, from June 23, 2010, until August 16, 2013.

== Early life and education ==
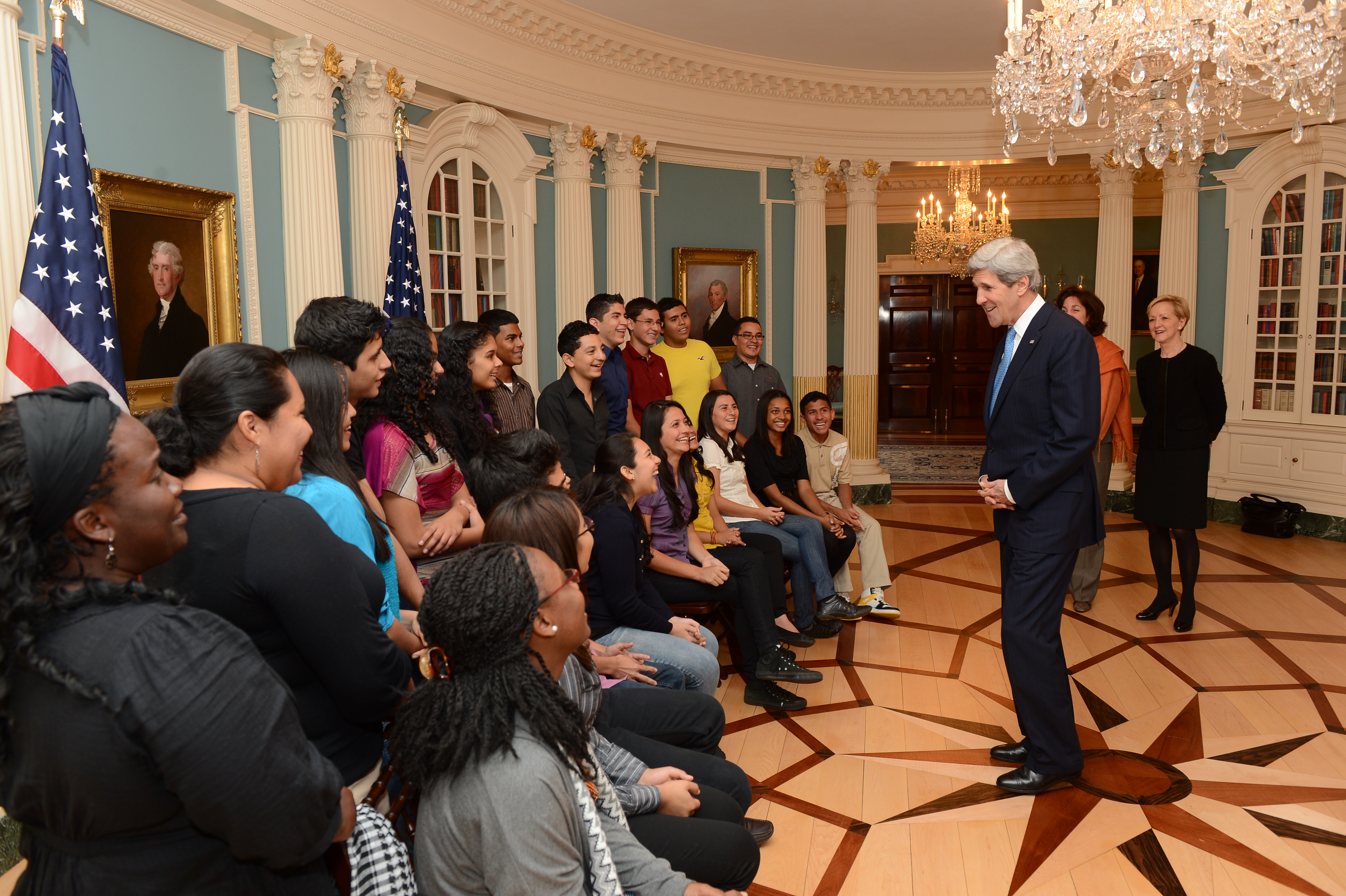
Ann Stock (right) in meeting of Secretary John Kerry With Central American Youth Ambassadors

Stock, an Indiana native, graduated from Jefferson High School in Lafayette, Indiana, in 1964 and received her B.A. in elementary education from Purdue University.

== Career ==
After college, she worked as an elementary school teacher and as a Pan Am flight attendant based in Washington, D.C.

During the 1980 U.S. presidential election, Stock was deputy press secretary for Vice President of the United States Walter Mondale. She then became Vice President of Corporate Communications and Public Relations for Bloomingdale's.

In 1993, President of the United States Bill Clinton named Stock White House Social Secretary, a post she held until 1997. From September 1997 to June 2010, she was Vice President of Institutional Affairs at the John F. Kennedy Center for the Performing Arts.

In 2010, President Barack Obama named Stock Assistant Secretary of State for Educational and Cultural Affairs and after Senate confirmation, she was sworn in on June 23, 2010. She was succeeded by Evan Ryan in 2013.

Stock serves on the board of Americans for the Arts and the Americans for the Arts Action Fund.

She is married and has one son.

Government offices
Preceded by Goli Ameri	Assistant Secretary of State for Educational and Cultural Affairs; 2010–2013	Next: Evan Ryan
Preceded by Laurie Firestone	White House Social Secretary; 1993–1997	Next: Capricia Marshall
