= John Giffen Weinmann =

Former United States Ambassador to Finland and Chief of Protocol

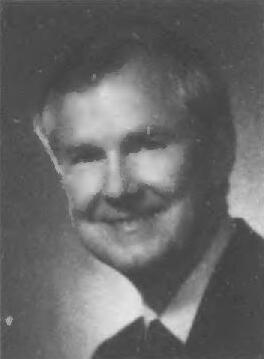

25th Chief of Protocol of the United States
- In office October 31, 1991 – January 20, 1993
- President: George H. W. Bush
- Preceded by: Joseph Verner Reed Jr.
- Succeeded by: Molly M. Raiser

United States Ambassador to Finland
- In office November 10, 1989 – August 29, 1991
- President: George H. W. Bush
- Preceded by: Rockwell A. Schnabel
- Succeeded by: John Hubert Kelly

Personal details
- Born: August 29, 1928
- Died: June 9, 2016 (aged 87)
- Education: Tulane University

John Giffen Weinmann (August 29, 1928 – June 9, 2016) served as United States Ambassador to Finland and later as the Chief of Protocol of the United States under President George H. W. Bush. He was appointed Ambassador to Finland on October 10, 1989, and presented his credentials on November 10 of that year. His tenure in Finland concluded on August 29, 1991, after being nominated to be Chief of Protocol on July 11, 1991. He succeeded Rockwell A. Schnabel and was succeeded by John Hubert Kelly.

He served as Chief of Protocol from October 31, 1991, to January 20, 1993, succeeding Joseph Verner Reed, Jr. and being succeeded by Molly M. Raiser.

He attended Tulane University.
