= Edward Djerejian =

American diplomat

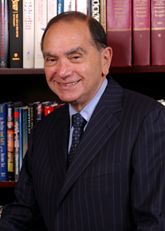
- Ambassador Edward P. Djerejian

United States Ambassador to Israel
- In office January 13, 1994 – August 9, 1994
- Nominated by: Bill Clinton
- Preceded by: William Caldwell Harrop
- Succeeded by: Martin Indyk

16th Assistant Secretary of State for Near Eastern Affairs
- In office September 30, 1991 – December 17, 1993
- President: George H. W. Bush; Bill Clinton
- Preceded by: John Hubert Kelly
- Succeeded by: Robert Pelletreau

United States Ambassador to Syria
- In office October 2, 1988 – July 25, 1991
- Nominated by: Ronald Reagan
- Preceded by: William L. Eagleton, Jr.
- Succeeded by: Christopher W.S. Ross

Acting Assistant Secretary of State for South Asian Affairs
- In office August 24, 1992 – May 30, 1993
- Succeeded by: Robin Raphel

Personal details
- Born: Edward Peter Djerejian; March 6, 1939 (age 87) New York City, New York, U.S.
- Education: Georgetown University

Edward Peter Djerejian (born March 6, 1939) is a former United States diplomat who served in eight administrations from John F. Kennedy to Bill Clinton (1962–94). He served as the United States Ambassador to Syria (1988–91) and Israel (1993–94), Special Assistant to President Ronald Reagan and Deputy Press Secretary of Foreign Affairs (1985–1986), and was Assistant Secretary of State for Near Eastern Affairs (1991–1993.) He was the founding director of Rice University's Baker Institute for Public Policy (1994–2022) He is a senior fellow at the Middle East Initiative at Harvard Kennedy School's Belfer Center for Science and International Affairs, a fellow of the American Academy of Arts and Sciences and is on the board of trustees of the Carnegie Corporation of New York. He is a Proprietor of the Boston Athenaeum. Djerejian was elected chairman of Occidental Petroleum Corporation's board of directors (2013–2015). Djerejian is the author of the book Danger and Opportunity: An American Ambassador's Journey Through the Middle East (Simon & Schuster, Threshold Editions, September 2008. ISBN 1-416-55493-9)

== Life and education ==
Of Armenian descent, Djerejian was born in New York in 1939. He graduated from Georgetown University in 1960. Djerejian served in the US Army in Korea for the next two years, and then joined the Foreign Service.

Besides English, he speaks Arabic, Armenian, French, and Russian.

== Career ==
He served as special assistant to Under Secretary of State George Ball (1962–64), a political officer in Beirut, Lebanon (1965–69) and in Casablanca, Morocco (1969–72), executive assistant to Under Secretary of State Joseph J. Sisco (1972–1975), consul general in Bordeaux, France (1975–77), officer in the Bureau of European Affairs (1978–79), chief of the US Embassy's political section in Moscow (1979–81), deputy chief of the US Mission to Jordan (1981–84), Special Assistant to President Ronald Reagan and Deputy Press Secretary of Foreign Affairs (1985–1986), Deputy Assistant Secretary of Near Eastern and South Asian Affairs (1986–88), Ambassador to Syria (1989–1991), Assistant Secretary of State for Near Eastern Affairs (1991–93), United States Ambassador to Israel (1993–94), He was Director of the James A. Baker III Institute for Public Policy at Rice University (August 1994 – 2022). In 2021 the Baker Institute was ranked the #1 University-Affiliated Think Tank in the World by the University of Pennsylvania Global Think Tank Survey. In 2022 Djerejian retired as the Founding Director of Rice University's Baker Institute for Public Policy. That year he was appointed a Senior Fellow at the JFK School Belfer Center's Middle East Initiative at Harvard University.

Djerejian, as Assistant Secretary of State for Near Eastern Affairs in an official speech at Meridian House, coined the description of the purported democratic goals of Islamic radicals as "One man, one vote, one time." In that speech he stated that with the fall of the Soviet Union and the defeat of communism. the next "ism" the United States would face is extremism and terrorism of either a secular or religious cloak.

Ambassador Djerejian was asked by Secretary of State Colin Powell to chair the congressionally mandated bipartisan Advisory Group on Public Diplomacy for the Arab and Muslim World which published its report in October 2003. He was Senior Policy Advisor to the congressionally mandated bipartisan Iraq Study Group which published its report in December 2006. In 2010, he chaired the Baker Institute's workshop that produced the report "Getting to the Territorial Endgame of an Israeli-Palestinian Peace Settlement".

Djerejian is the author of the book Danger and Opportunity: An American Ambassador's Journey Through the Middle East.

Ambassador Djerejian has been awarded the Presidential Distinguished Service Award, the Department of State's Distinguished Honor Award, the President's Meritorious Service Award, the Anti-Defamation League's Moral Statesman Award, the Ellis Island Medal of Honor, the Award for Humanitarian Diplomacy from Netanya Academic College in Israel, and the Association of Rice Alumni 2009 Gold Medal—the highest honor bestowed by the association in recognition of extraordinary service to the university. Djerejian is also the recipient of the National Order of the Cedar bestowed by President Lahoud of Lebanon, the Order of Ouissam Alaouite bestowed by King Mohammed VI of Morocco and the Medal of Honor bestowed by President Sargsyan of Armenia.

Ambassador Djerejian was Chairman of Occidental Petroleum Corporation's Board of Directors between 2013 and 2015. In 2011, he was named to the board of trustees of the Carnegie Corporation of New York and Vice Chairman of the Board (2018–2019). Also in 2011, Djerejian was elected a fellow of the American Academy of Arts and Sciences.

He served in the United States Army as a first lieutenant in the Republic of Korea following his graduation from the School of Foreign Service at Georgetown University. He holds a Bachelor of Science from Georgetown University, as well as an honorary doctorate in humanities from Georgetown and an honorary Doctor of Laws degree from Middlebury College.

He is married to Françoise Andree Liliane Marie (Haelters) Djerejian. They have two children, Gregory Peter Djerejian and Francesca Natalia Djerejian, and four grandchildren, Isabel Djerejian, Sebastian Djerejian, Cassandra Vargas and Camila Vargas.

In October 2016 Djerejian joined other prominent Armenians on calling the government of Armenia to adopt "new development strategies based on inclusiveness and collective action" and to create "an opportunity for the Armenian world to pivot toward a future of prosperity, to transform the post-Soviet Armenian Republic into a vibrant, modern, secure, peaceful and progressive homeland for a global nation."

== Notes and references ==
Diplomatic posts
Preceded by William L. Eagleton, Jr.	U.S. Ambassador to Syria; 1988–1991	Succeeded by Christopher W.S. Ross
Preceded by William Caldwell Harrop	U.S. Ambassador to Israel; 1993–1994	Succeeded by Martin Indyk
Government offices
Preceded by John Hubert Kelly	Assistant Secretary of State for Near Eastern and South Asian Affairs; September 30, 1991 – December 17, 1993	Succeeded by Robert Pelletreau
