= Ethan Rosenzweig =

American university official, diplomat, and attorney

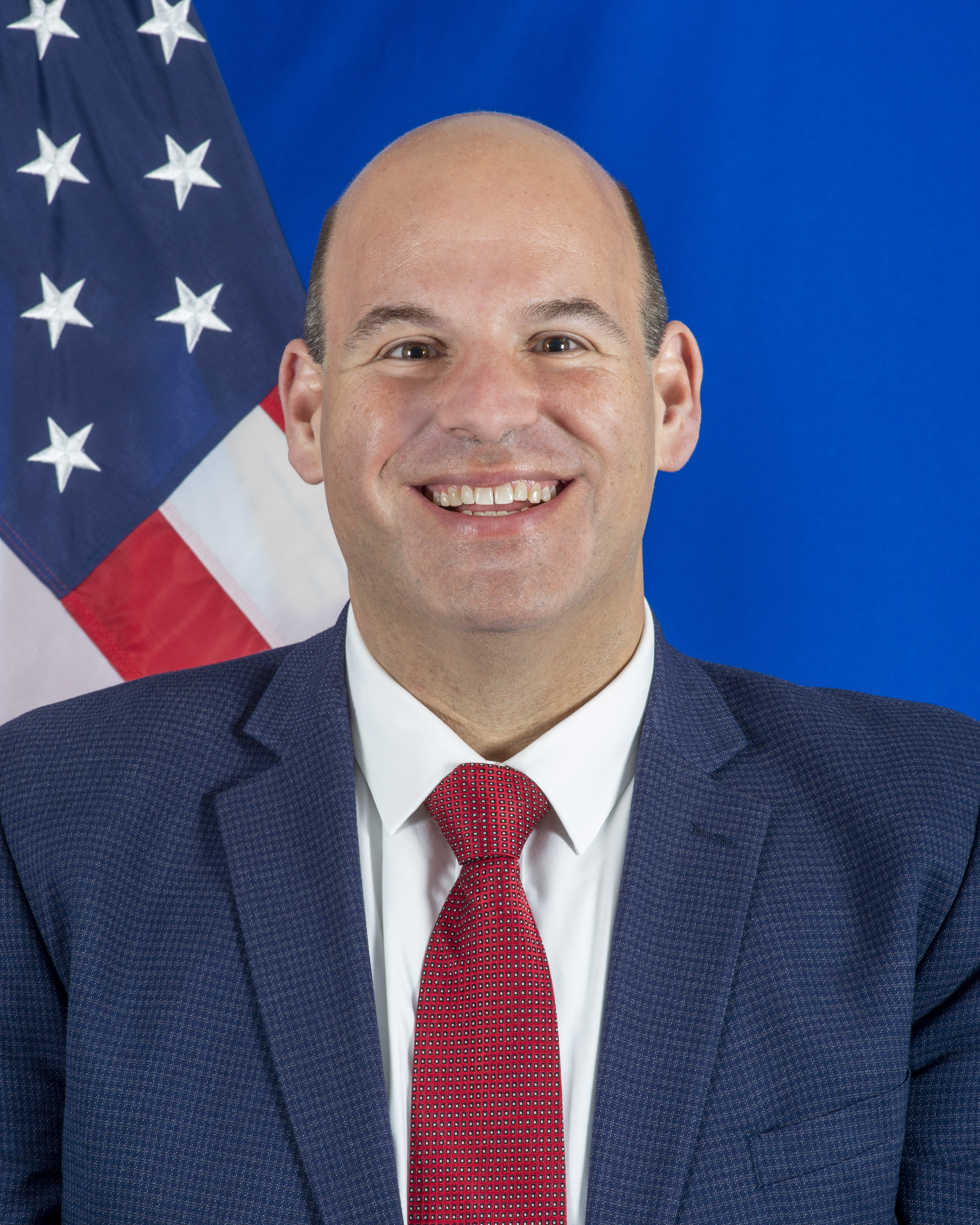
- Official portrait, 2021

Acting Chief of Protocol of the United States
- In office August 1, 2023 – January 20, 2025
- President: Joe Biden
- Preceded by: Rufus Gifford
- Succeeded by: Monica Crowley

Personal details
- Party: Democratic
- Education: American University (BA, MPP); Emory University (JD)

Ethan Rosenzweig is an American government official who served as the chief of protocol of the United States from 2023 to 2025.

== Early life and education ==
Rosenzweig is from Monroe, Louisiana. Rosenzweig earned his undergraduate degree and master's in public policy from American University in Washington, D.C. He later earned his J.D. from Emory University School of Law in Atlanta, Georgia.

== Career ==
Rosenzweig served as a presidential management fellow for the U.S. Department of Education, serving as deputy director of the Office of Policy Briefing and Scheduling, and a federal law clerk for the U.S. District Court in Georgia. He clerked for G. Ernest Tidwell of the U.S. District Court of Northern Georgia.

He worked at Emory Law as Associate Dean of Enrollment Management and Student Services.

In September 2021, Rosenzweig joined the U.S. State Department as Deputy Assistant Secretary for Academic Programs for the Bureau of Educational and Cultural Affairs.

In July 2023, Rosenzweig was named the chief of protocol, replacing Rufus Gifford. He officially assumed the role on August 1, 2023 and continued in the role in an acting capacity until January 20, 2025.
