= Mary Mel French =

American government official (born 1938)

Mel French

27th Chief of Protocol of the United States
- In office November 13, 1997 – January 20, 2001
- President: Bill Clinton
- Preceded by: Molly M. Raiser
- Succeeded by: Donald Ensenat

Personal details
- Born: 1938 (age 87–88) Jonesboro, Arkansas
- Party: Democratic
- Spouse: Bill Roberts
- Education: Stephens College; University of Arkansas

Mary Mel French (born in 1938) served as the United States Chief of Protocol, serving under President Bill Clinton. She assumed office on November 13, 1997, and left on January 20, 2001. She replaced Molly M. Raiser and was replaced by Donald Ensenat. She authored the book United States Protocol : The Guide to Official Diplomatic Etiquette.

== Early life ==
French was born in Jonesboro, Arkansas in 1938, and grew up in the small farming town of Weiner, Arkansas. Her father was a state representative for sixteen years and the superintendent of the local school district.

French earned an A.A. degree from Stephens College in Columbia, Missouri, and a B.A. in international studies from the University of Arkansas in Little Rock. From 1963 to 1974, she served in the Jonesboro Junior Auxiliary and was a volunteer for St. Bernard's Hospital Auxiliary.

== Career ==
A close friend of Bill Clinton, French served as the administrative director of the Clinton-Gore campaign during the 1992 presidential campaign, later serving as the Co-Executive Director, with Rahm Emanuel, of the 1992 presidential inauguration after their win.

From June 1993 until October 1996, she served as Assistant Chief of Protocol for visits, overseeing "the scheduling and arrangements for visits to the United States for chiefs of state, heads of government and other dignitaries during state, official, official working, working and private visits. She was responsible for credentials for new foreign ambassadors and providing backup for presidential delegations. In addition, her responsibilities included the overall selection of gifts for the President, Vice President, and Secretary of State. Under Ms. French's supervision, the Visits Section provided major support and organization for the Asian-Pacific Economic Council Conference in Seattle, Washington, the Summit of the Americas in Miami, Florida, and the United Nations 50th anniversary in New York."

From October 1996 until November 1997, French served as Deputy Chief of Protocol with "extensive duties that included greeting foreign visitors, conducting swear-ins of senior State Department officials, hosting diplomatic events, and representing the President and Secretary at embassy events. In addition, she traveled abroad with the President and on presidential delegations, managed the Protocol Office and supervised the Assistant Chiefs of Protocol."

=== U.S. Chief of Protocol ===
French was nominated as Chief of Protocol by President Clinton and confirmed by the Senate on November 6, 1997. Thereafter, she was sworn in as Chief of Protocol with the rank of Ambassador by Secretary of State Madeleine Albright on November 13, 1997. "The Chief of Protocol, by Presidential direction, serves as Chief of Protocol for the U.S. Government, and as the official protocol officer for the White House. In this capacity, she advises the President, the Vice President, and the Secretary of State in the fulfillment of the U.S. Government's obligation relating to national and international protocol in the United States or in which the United States participates abroad." In addition, as Chief of Protocol, she managed Blair House, the official guest house of the President which hosts visiting dignitaries and other guests of the president.

== Personal life ==
For many years, French lived in Little Rock, where she was on the Arkansas Governor's Mansion Board, serving as its president from 1991 until 1992. From 1990 to 1992, she was on the Arkansas Historic Preservation State Review Board and was a member of the Arkansas Arts Center.

French was married, and divorced, from Bill Roberts, a rice farmer with whom she had three children.

Political offices
Preceded by Molly M. Raiser	Chief of Protocol of the United States; 1997–2001	Succeeded by Donald Ensenat
