= Rockwell A. Schnabel =

American businessman and diplomat (born 1936)

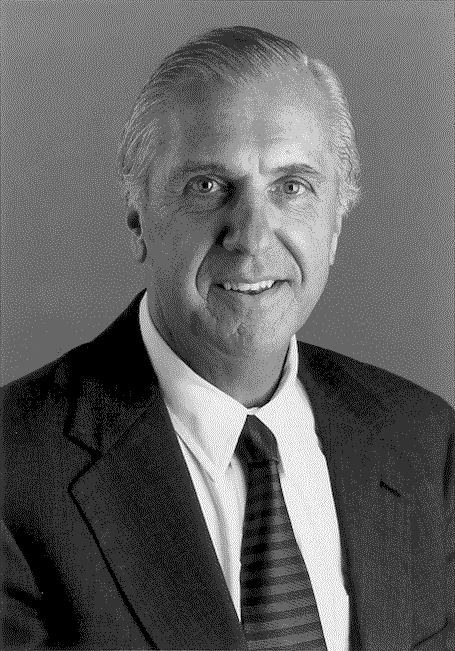
- Schnabel in 2002

15th United States Ambassador to the European Union
- In office October 9, 2001 – June 18, 2005
- President: George W. Bush
- Preceded by: Richard Morningstar
- Succeeded by: C. Boyden Gray

7th United States Deputy Secretary of Commerce
- In office April 25, 1991 – January 20, 1993
- President: George H. W. Bush
- Preceded by: Thomas J. Murrin
- Succeeded by: David J. Barram

4th Under Secretary of Commerce for Travel and Tourism
- In office May 1, 1989 – July 18, 1992
- President: George H. W. Bush
- Preceded by: Charles E. Cobb Jr.
- Succeeded by: John G. Keller Jr.

22nd United States Ambassador to Finland
- In office February 28, 1986 – February 24, 1989
- President: Ronald Reagan; George H. W. Bush
- Preceded by: Keith Foote Nyborg
- Succeeded by: John Giffen Weinmann

Personal details
- Born: December 30, 1936 (age 89) Amsterdam, Netherlands
- Party: Republican

Rockwell A. Schnabel (born December 30, 1936) is a Dutch-American businessman who served as the United States Ambassador to the European Union from 2001 to 2005. He previously served as the United States Ambassador to Finland from 1986 to 1989, the Under Secretary of Commerce for Travel and Tourism from 1989 to 1992 and as the United States Deputy Secretary of Commerce from 1991 to 1993.

== Early life ==
Rockwell Schnabel was born in Amsterdam, the Netherlands, on December 30, 1936. He attended Trinity College in the Netherlands, but did not graduate. In 1957, he moved to the United States to live with relatives in California. Although he initially planned to stay in the country for only a few years, he later decided to make the move permanent. Following his decision to stay in America, Schnabel joined the California Air National Guard, where he served for six years, and became a United States citizen in the early 1960s.

While serving in the Air National Guard, Schnabel began working in the finance industry as a research analyst. In 1965, he joined the Los Angeles-based brokerage firm Bateman Eichler, Hill Richards Inc., where he spent nearly two decades, eventually becoming the chairman of its executive committee. After selling his share of Bateman Eichler in 1983, he briefly worked with another firm, Morgan, Olmstead, Kennedy & Gardner. He left Morgan, Olmstead and resigned his positions on the boards of several other organizations when he was named ambassador to Finland three years later.

In 1984, Schnabel was a member of the organizing committee for the 1984 Summer Olympics, which were held in Los Angeles. During the games themselves, he was the Olympics' attaché to the Netherlands.

== Political career ==
Schnabel began supporting the Republican Party shortly after his career in finance began. He initially supported candidates in the California State Senate, before organizing support among the local financial community for Richard Nixon in the 1968 presidential election.

In November 1985, President Ronald Reagan nominated Schnabel to be the United States Ambassador to Finland; he would serve in the role from 1986 to 1989. In an interview with the Library of Congress, Schnabel explained that he had approached the Reagan administration looking for a position in the United States Foreign Service, believing that he would be successful due to his experience in international business and his background growing up in Europe. During his tenure, he worked on an export control agreement between the two countries.

In 1989, Schnabel returned to the United States to serve as Under Secretary for Travel and Tourism in the Department of Commerce, and in 1991 President George H. W. Bush nominated him to serve as United States Deputy Secretary of Commerce, a position he held until 1993, when the administration of President Bill Clinton took over. That year, Schnabel founded the investment company Trident Capital.

In 2001, Schnabel was nominated by President George W. Bush to serve as the United States Ambassador to the European Union. Schnabel had initially been set to become the ambassador to Italy, and the Italian government had already approved his appointment; however, after the Italian-American community protested that an Italian-American was not selected for that position, Schnabel was instead offered the European Union ambassadorship. Schnabel had been confirmed by the Senate for the position, but had not yet arrived in Europe, when the September 11 attacks took place, drastically shifting the policy agenda that Schnabel was expected to lead. He served in the position until 2005.

== Personal life ==
Schnabel is married to Marna Schnabel (née Del Mar). Together they have two daughters, Darrin and Christy, and a son, Evan. Marna, who was trained as an architect, worked for a time for Frank Gehry before leaving the field. Gehry designed a house for the Schnabels in Westside, Los Angeles, which was built while Rockwell was Ambassador to Finland. The house, which the Schnabels no longer own, was placed for sale at nearly $12 million in 2014.

In 2005, Schnabel and co-author Francis X. Rocca published The Next Superpower? The Rise of Europe and Its Challenge to the United States, an examination of the European Union and its impacts on the United States, which in part argues that the United States should not attempt to prevent the continent's continued integration.
