= Capricia Marshall =

American lawyer

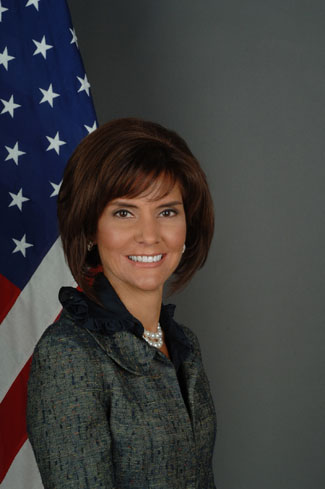

30th Chief of Protocol of the United States
- In office August 3, 2009 – August 1, 2013
- President: Barack Obama
- Deputy: Dennis Cheng, Lee Satterfield
- Preceded by: Nancy Brinker
- Succeeded by: Peter A. Selfridge

23rd White House Social Secretary
- In office October 1997 – January 20, 2001
- President: Bill Clinton
- Preceded by: Ann Stock
- Succeeded by: Catherine Fenton

Personal details
- Born: Capricia Penavic; 1964 (age 61–62) Cleveland, Ohio, U.S.
- Party: Democratic
- Education: Purdue University; Case Western Reserve University
- Website: Official biography

Capricia Penavic Marshall served as Chief of Protocol of the United States from 2009 to August 2013.

== Early life ==
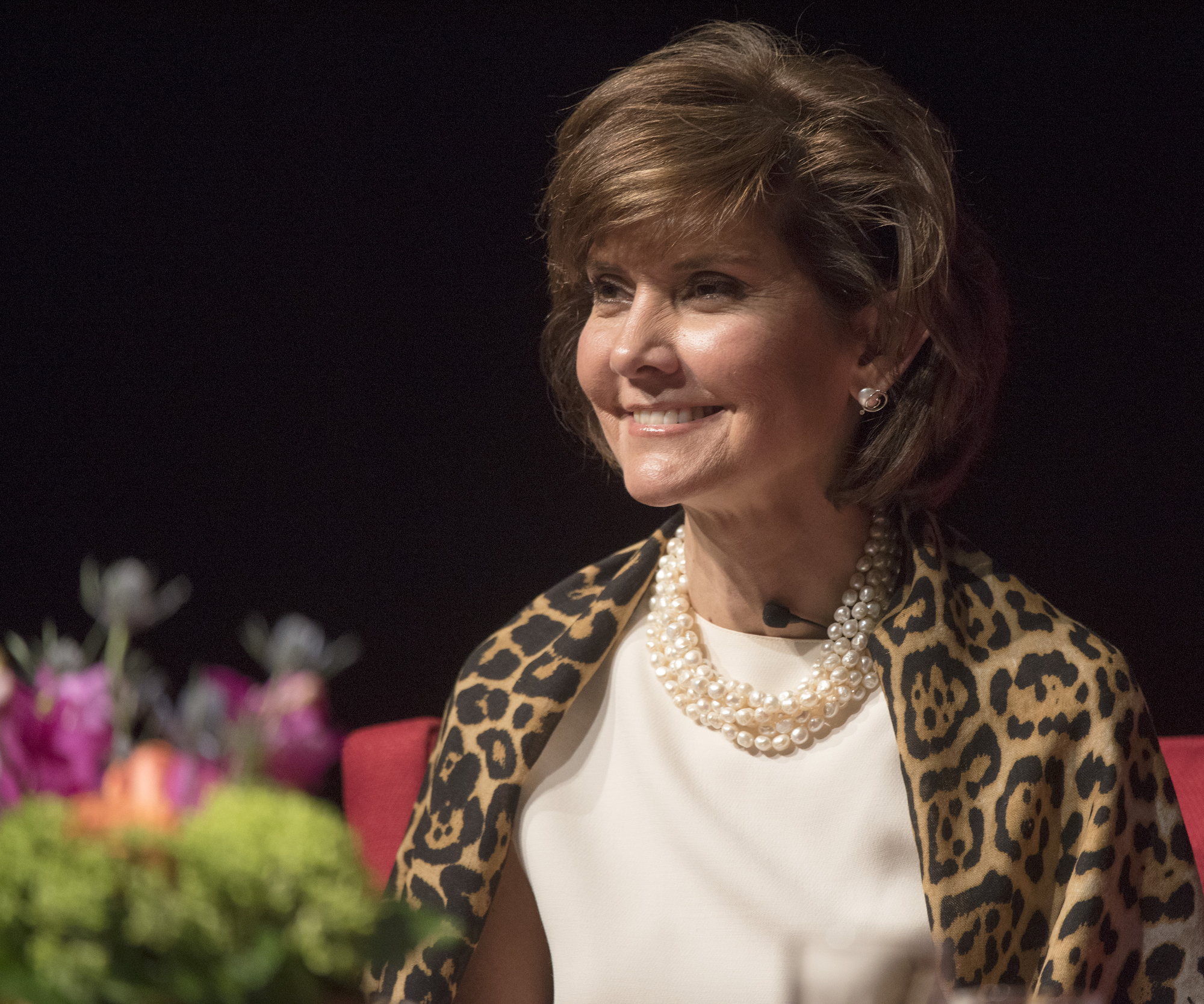
Capricia Marshall at the LBJ Presidential Library in 2018

Marshall was born in Cleveland, Ohio, to immigrant parents, a Herzegovinian Croat father and Mexican mother. In 1986, she graduated from Purdue University with a Bachelor of Arts in Political Science and International Studies. She studied at the University of Madrid for a year before attending Case Western Reserve University School of Law, where she was president of the student bar association, and graduated in 1990.

== Career ==
After receiving her Juris Doctor, Marshall worked for the Bill Clinton presidential campaign, 1992 as Special Assistant to Hillary Clinton. In 1993, she served on the East Wing staff of then-First Lady Hillary Clinton as Special Assistant to the First Lady. In October 1997, at the age of 32, Marshall was appointed Deputy Assistant to the President and White House Social Secretary. After President Clinton's term ended in January 2001, Marshall continued working with the former president as a senior advisor, helping to advance his work in policy, politics, and community initiatives. In 2001, she began working as a consultant to a number of nonprofit and private sector organizations.

In 2006, Marshall joined the re-election efforts for Senator Hillary Clinton, and subsequently joined the Hillary Clinton presidential campaign, 2008. As Senior Advisor, she led the Surrogate Speakers Program and helped coordinate women's outreach. In 2008, Marshall became executive director of HillPAC and Friends of Hillary and oversaw the closure of both committees.

She was sworn in as US Chief of Protocol on August 3, 2009. On May 16, 2010, Marshall was the keynote speaker at Commencement of her law school alma mater.

On March 26, 2014, Elle honored Marshall, with others, at Italian Embassy in the United States during its annual "Women in Washington Power List."

In September 2023, Marshall joined strategic advisory firm FGS Global as a partner in the firm's Washington, D.C. office.

== Personal life ==
She lives in Washington, D.C., with her husband, Robert, and their son, Cole Marshall.

Political offices
| Preceded by Ann Stock | White House Social Secretary; 1997–2001 | Next: Catherine Fenton |
| Preceded by Laura Bowen Wills; Acting | Chief of Protocol of the United States; 2009–2013 | Next: Natalie Jones; Acting |
