= New Jersey Heroes =

New Jersey Heroes is a non-profit foundation established in 2010 by Mary Pat Christie, the state First Lady and wife of Governor Chris Christie to honor individuals and groups who make New Jersey a better place.

Some New Jersey communities run online polls to select nonprofit organizations to nominate for the awards. After the Market Street Mission in Morristown won a New Jersey Heroes award, Governor and Mrs. Christie went to the Mission to serve lunch in the charity's soup kitchen.
