= Charles K. Gifford =

American banker and businessman (born 1942)

Charles Gifford
- Born: November 8, 1942 (age 83); Providence, Rhode Island, U.S.
- Education: Princeton University (BA)
- Occupation: Banker
- Years active: 1964–present
- Children: 4, including Rufus Gifford

Charles K. Gifford (born November 8, 1942) is an American banker and businessman. He is the chairman emeritus of Bank of America, having served on its board of directors from 2004 to 2016.

== Early life and education ==
Gifford was born on November 8, 1942, in Providence, Rhode Island. His father was a successful banking executive, and his mother was a homemaker. Through his mother, Gifford is a descendant of the John Brown and the Brown family. Gifford, his parents, and three siblings were passengers in the first-class cabin on the SS Andrea Doria when it collided with the Swedish liner MS Stockholm and sank off Nantucket in 1956. The Giffords survived the accident, which claimed 46 lives.

Gifford earned a Bachelor of Arts in history from Princeton University in 1964.

== Career ==
After graduating from college in 1964, he began his banking career in New York City working at Chase Manhattan until 1966 before joining Bank of Boston.

At Bank of Boston, Gifford worked in commercial lending, first as a loan officer in 1967, then in various vice president positions. From 1975 to 1977 he headed corporate lending at the London, England, office. In Boston he became the executive of the Corporate Banking Group in 1984. After two years as vice chairman, the company promoted him to president in 1989, with Ira Stepanian as chief executive officer. When Stepanian resigned in July, 1995, the board promoted Gifford as his successor. He became CEO of FleetBoston Financial in December 2002.

Gifford served as chairman of Bank of America from 2004 to 2005, when the company acquired FleetBoston, and he served as a board member until 2016.

Gifford has also made several contributions to Democratic Party politicians and candidates, including Barack Obama, Joe Kennedy III, Alan Khazei, Claire McCaskill, Bill Keating, Andrei Cherny, Barney Frank, and Angus King.

=== Service on boards of directors ===
He has served on the following boards:

- CBS Corporation, Director, 2006–2018
- Dana–Farber Cancer Institute, Director
- Northeastern University, Trustee
- NSTAR LLC, Presiding Trustee, 1999–present

== Personal life ==
Gifford married Anne Dewing in 1964. They have four children, including financier and diplomat Rufus Gifford.
