= Natalie Jones (diplomat) =

American government official

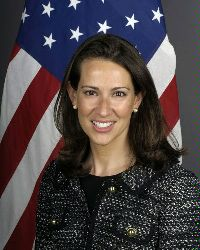

Acting Chief of Protocol of the United States
- In office August 1, 2013 – May 13, 2014
- President: Barack Obama
- Preceded by: Capricia Marshall
- Succeeded by: Peter A. Selfridge

Deputy U.S. Chief of Protocol
- In office July 1, 2011 – January 20, 2017
- President: Barack Obama

Natalie Jones served as the United States Deputy Chief of Protocol. She was the acting United States Chief of Protocol during the Obama administration from August 1, 2013, until Peter A. Selfridge was sworn into the post on May 13, 2014. In this role she served as the link between the White House and foreign ambassador and visiting dignitaries. In addition the office manages Blair House, the official guesthouse of the President of the United States.

Though she was reported to be a likely pick by the first Trump administration to be the White House Social Secretary, The Washington Post reported on February 6, 2017, that she had backed out of the hiring process.

== Personal life ==
Jones is a graduate of Naperville Central High School and Emory University. She married Patrick Hallahan in 2012.

Political offices
Preceded by Capricia Marshall	Chief of Protocol of the United States; Acting; August 1, 2013–May 13, 2014	Next: Peter A. Selfridge
