= Rufus Gifford =

American diplomat (born 1974)

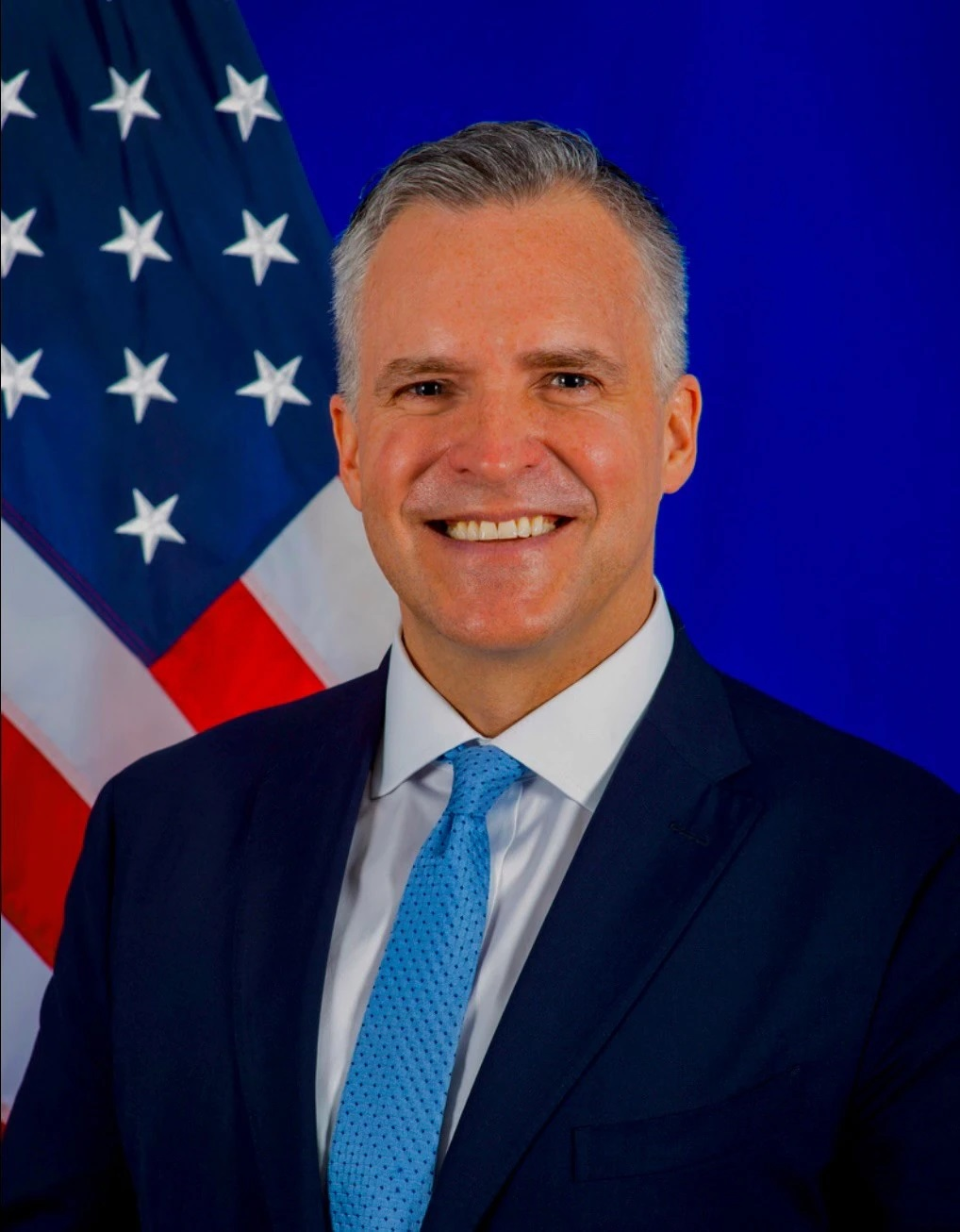
- Official portrait, 2022

34th Chief of Protocol of the United States
- In office January 3, 2022 – July 28, 2023
- President: Joe Biden
- Preceded by: Cam Henderson
- Succeeded by: Monica Crowley

62nd United States Ambassador to Denmark
- In office September 13, 2013 – January 20, 2017
- President: Barack Obama
- Preceded by: Laurie Fulton
- Succeeded by: Carla Sands

Personal details
- Born: John Rufus Gifford; August 5, 1974 (age 52) Boston, Massachusetts, U.S.
- Party: Democratic
- Spouse: Stephen DeVincent (m. 2015)
- Parent: Charles K. Gifford (father)
- Education: Brown University (BA)
- Awards: Order of the Dannebrog

John Rufus Gifford (born August 5, 1974) is an American politician and diplomat who was the chief of protocol of the United States from 2022 to 2023. Between 2013 and 2017, he was the United States ambassador to Denmark.

In 2012, Gifford was finance director for Barack Obama's presidential re-election campaign. Once re-elected, Obama nominated him to be the United States ambassador to Denmark, a post he held until the end of Obama's presidency. After returning to the United States, he was a candidate for the House of Representatives in 2018, running in Massachusetts's 3rd congressional district. Gifford lost in the Democratic primary to Lori Trahan, who won the general election.

He was deputy campaign manager for Joe Biden's 2020 presidential campaign and finance chair for Biden's presidential re-election campaign.

== Early life and education ==
Gifford grew up in Manchester-by-the-Sea, Massachusetts. He graduated from St. Paul's School in Concord, New Hampshire, in 1992 and he earned his Bachelor of Arts from Brown University in Rhode Island.

After college, Gifford moved to Hollywood and worked as an assistant to producer John Davis. During his time there, he became the associate producer for Daddy Day Care, Life or Something Like It, and Dr. Dolittle 2, and he appeared as an actor in the films Garfield: The Movie and The Hiding Place.

== Political career ==
Gifford started in Democratic politics by working on John Kerry's 2004 presidential campaign, and subsequently started his own consulting business and advised numerous Democratic officials and advocated for progressive causes across the country.

He first met Senator Barack Obama in January 2007, at a party hosted by Senator Ted Kennedy. Prior to the meeting, Gifford had been offered a job on Hillary Clinton's 2008 presidential campaign, but he declined and instead accepted the same job with Obama's campaign.

After Obama took office, Gifford served as finance director for the Democratic National Committee in Washington, D.C., before moving to Chicago as a senior staff member of President Obama's 2012 re-election campaign. As National Finance Director for the re-election campaign, he was responsible for the record-setting billion-dollar budget.

=== U.S. ambassador to Denmark (2013–2017) ===
On August 1, 2013, Gifford's nomination from President Obama to be the next United States ambassador to the Kingdom of Denmark was confirmed by the United States Senate. He was sworn into the role on August 15, 2013, and presented his credentials to the queen of Denmark on September 13, 2013.

In his capacity as the ambassador, he helped modernize the transatlantic relationship through youth engagement and institution-building, among other bilateral and global issues. He outlined a diplomatic strategy that prioritized non-traditional audiences and people-to-people relationships. As part of a never-before-seen public diplomacy strategy, he was the subject of the documentary series I am the Ambassador, broadcast on the principal public service channel for youth and for several weeks was its most watched program. Its first season tracked his professional and personal life over three months in six episodes, including a conversation with Mitt Romney, a screening of an HBO film for the Danish film industry, and his own 40th birthday party. When it was renewed for a second season, Gifford made the announcement himself speaking Danish in a video posted on Facebook. The series won the Big Character award at the 2015 TV-Prisen award-show.

As Ambassador, he traveled to Greenland for bilateral meetings on climate change, promoted counter-extremism initiatives and Danish–American trade, and worked to maintain Danish military support in Iraq and Afghanistan. In 2016, he accompanied U.S. secretary of transportation Anthony Foxx, several American mayors (including later U.S. secretary of transportation Pete Buttigieg), as well as Danish transport minister Hans Christian Schmidt on a bike ride around Copenhagen to showcase its success as a "cyclist-friendly city".

Gifford was an integral part of bringing the American art form of Long Form Improvisation to Denmark. In September 2016, he appeared in the premiere performance at the first improv theatre in Denmark, Improv Comedy Copenhagen. He said, "No matter what you are doing, you always have to allow time to laugh, smile and have fun. And creating that balance is incredibly important." Gifford served as an honorary board member of the American-Danish Business Council.

On January 16, 2017, Gifford was awarded the Grand Cross of the Order of the Dannebrog by Her Majesty Queen Margrethe II of Denmark for his "meritorious service to the Kingdom of Denmark".

His service in Denmark ended upon the inauguration of President Donald Trump, who allowed no US ambassadors to continue to serve under his administration.

=== Post-ambassadorship ===
On November 13, 2017, Gifford announced on Twitter that he was running for Congress in Massachusetts's 3rd congressional district in the 2018 United States House of Representatives elections in Massachusetts. Gifford was endorsed by U.S. senators Tim Kaine and Sherrod Brown as well as Valerie Jarrett. In the primary election, Gifford received 12,796 votes, or about 15%, coming in fifth in the 10-way race. His opponent in the primary, Lori Trahan, went on to win the general election on November 6, 2018.

In August 2019, when President Trump expressed an interest in buying Greenland from Denmark, Gifford tweeted: "Oh dear lord... as someone who loves Greenland, has been there 9 times to every corner and loves the people, this is a complete and total catastrophe."

On January 24, 2020, Gifford endorsed Joe Biden for president in the 2020 Democratic Party presidential primaries. (Note: By August 2019 Gifford had made the maximum contribution to five candidates in the Democratic presidential primaries, including Pete Buttigieg, whose presence in the race he called "meaningful" for the gay community.) By the end of the month he was named to the campaign's national finance committee. On April 29, 2020, it was announced that Biden was hiring Gifford to be Deputy Campaign Manager on his presidential campaign. According to The Washington Post, Gifford was to focus on "finance, external outreach and coalition building". The New York Times reported this was seen as "elevating the role of the finance operation inside the campaign". In March he assessed the challenges the COVID-19 pandemic posed for fundraising: "I think Biden's campaign will end up being fine. The low-dollar fundraising will be there. My big concern is Democratic National Committee fundraising and state party fundraising. Those are so reliant on major donor fundraising and on events.... People are going to want to give to their local food bank and hospital and EMT staff—as they should. So it's harder to make the argument during this time to invest in a politician. The worst thing you can do right now is to be tone-deaf in the way you are approaching fundraising." As the campaign proceeded his responsibilities were both administrative, "coordinating a slew of virtual fund-raisers", and hands-on, staying "in regular touch with Wall Street donors ... and discussing campaign issues with deep-pocketed financiers".

=== U.S. chief of protocol ===
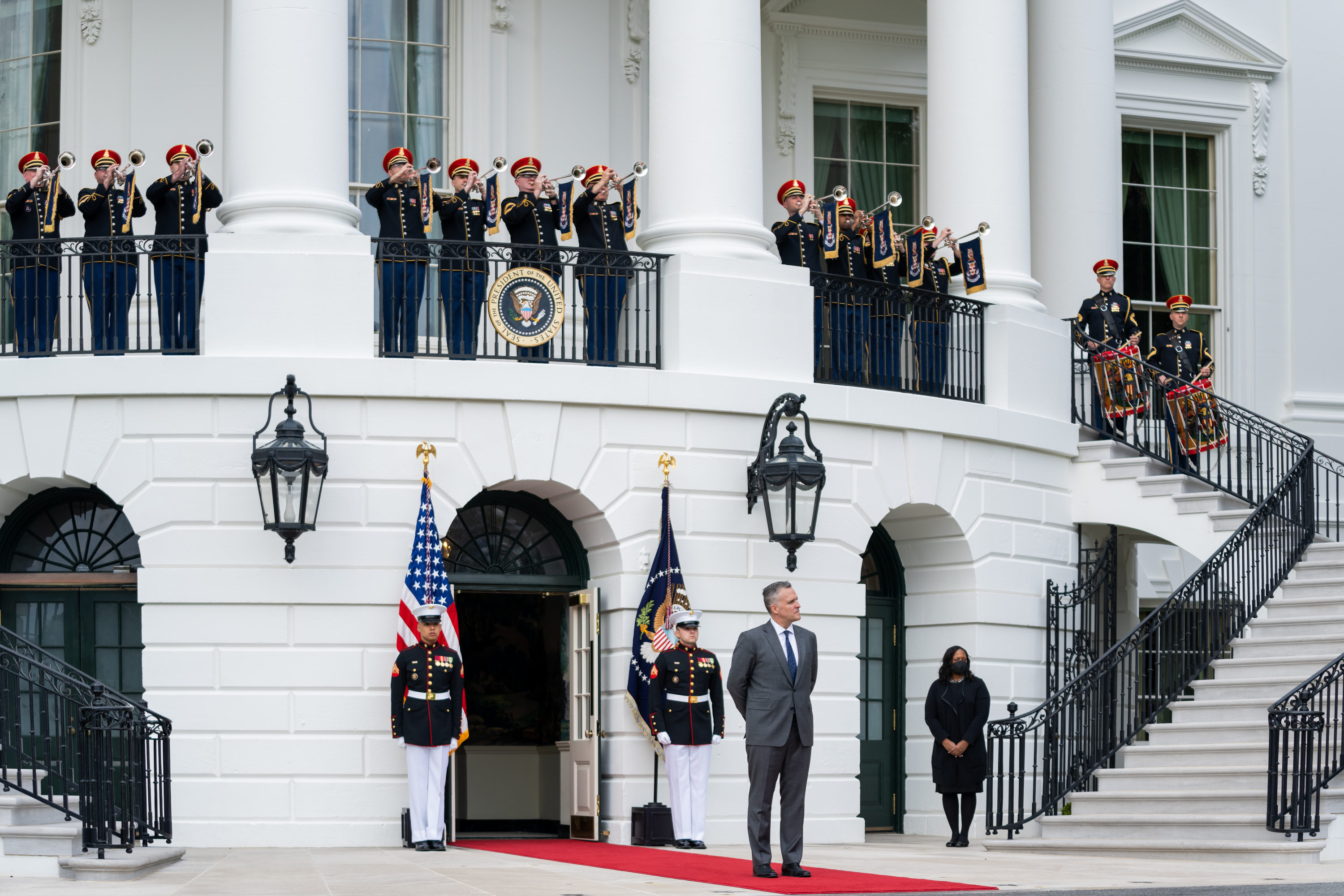
Gifford at the South Portico of the White House in 2022

In January 2021, Axios reported that Biden would tap Gifford to be Chief of Protocol of the United States. He was officially nominated by Biden on May 28, 2021. The Senate Foreign Relations Committee held a hearing on his nomination on July 27, 2021 and the committee reported his nomination favorably on August 4, 2021. The full Senate confirmed Gifford on December 18, 2021, via voice vote. He was sworn in on January 3, 2022.

Gifford resigned as Chief of Protocol in July 2023 to assume a position on the Biden 2024 presidential campaign.

=== Biden 2024 Finance Chair ===
In July 17, 2023, Biden's campaign announced Gifford's appointment as Finance Chair.

== Personal life ==
Gifford is gay, and commentators from GQ, Huffington Post, and L.A. Weekly referred to him as Barack Obama's informal "ambassador to the gay community". He discussed coming out as gay on the Danish TV series that chronicled his life while ambassador. He married his husband, Stephen DeVincent, a veterinarian, on October 10, 2015, in a ceremony at Copenhagen City Hall in Copenhagen, Denmark. They live in Concord, Massachusetts. In 2016, Gifford co-wrote a cookbook with his husband, called The Ambassador's Kitchen. He is a federal club member of the Human Rights Campaign and a partner in conservation for the World Wildlife Fund.

Gifford is the son of Charles K. Gifford, a banker who was chairman of Bank of America. Gifford is a cousin of former ice hockey player and current broadcaster A. J. Mleczko.

== Awards and honours ==
Country	Date	Honour	Grade of Honour	Ribbon	Post-nominal letters
Denmark	January 16, 2017	Order of the Dannebrog	Grand Cross		SK

== See also ==
- List of LGBT ambassadors of the United States

== Notes ==
Diplomatic posts
Preceded by Laurie Fulton	United States Ambassador to Denmark; 2013–2017	Succeeded by Carla Sands
Preceded by Asel Roberts; Acting	Chief of Protocol of the United States; 2022–2023	Succeeded by Ethan Rosenzweig; Acting
