= Richard W. Murphy =

American diplomat (1929–2024)

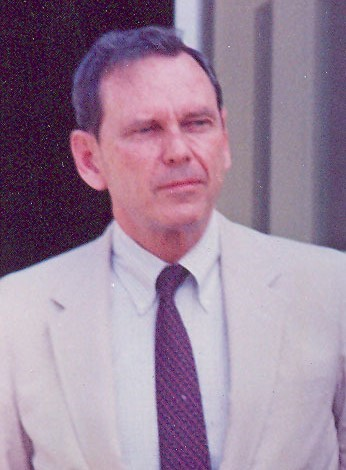
- Murphy in 1984

14th Assistant Secretary of State for Near Eastern and South Asian Affairs
- In office October 28, 1983 – May 15, 1989
- President: Ronald Reagan
- Preceded by: Nicholas A. Veliotes
- Succeeded by: John Hubert Kelly

Personal details
- Born: July 29, 1929 Boston, Massachusetts, U.S.
- Died: November 22, 2024 (aged 95) Manhattan, New York, U.S.
- Spouse: Anne Cook (m. 1955)
- Children: 3
- Education: Harvard University (BA); University of Cambridge (BA)

Richard William Murphy (July 29, 1929 – November 22, 2024) was an American diplomat and career member of the foreign service. He served as the 14th Assistant Secretary of State for Near Eastern and South Asian Affairs from 1983 to 1989 during the Ronald Reagan administration.

== Early life ==
Richard William Murphy was born on July 29, 1929, in Boston, Massachusetts. After graduating from Phillips Exeter Academy in 1947, he received BAs from Harvard University in 1951 and from Emmanuel College, Cambridge in 1953. From 1953 to 1955, he served in the U.S. Army.

== Career ==
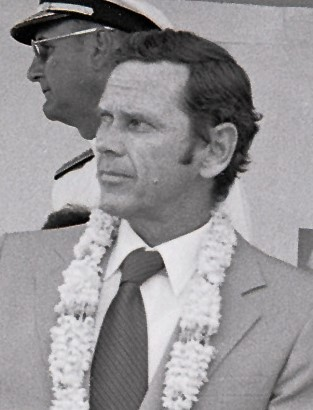
Murphy at Clark Air Base in 1979

He started his career in the United States Foreign Service as Vice Consul in Salisbury, Rhodesia (1955–1958). From 1959 to 1971, he worked for the Middle Eastern Bureau. He was the United States ambassador to Mauritania from 1971 to 1974, to Syria from 1974 to 1978, to the Philippines from 1978 to 1981, and to Saudi Arabia from 1981 to 1983. He served as the United States Assistant Secretary of State for Near Eastern and South Asian Affairs from 1983 to 1989.

Murphy is often credited with brokering the Taif Agreement in 1990, which led to the end of the 15-year Lebanon war. Starting in the 1993, and until 2004, he served as senior fellow for the Middle East Council for Foreign Relations, and as chairman of the Foreign Student Service Council, the Middle East Institute, and Chatham House Foundation.

He served on the board of directors of UNRWA USA, a Washington–DC based 501c3 nonprofit which aims to educate the general American public about the situation of Palestine refugees and generate support for UNRWA's work.

He was a two-time recipient of the State Department's Superior Honor Award, and a three-time recipient of the President's Distinguished Service Award.

From 2003 to 2005 he was a Director of Middle East International, a London based bi-monthly magazine providing news and analysis of events in the Middle East.

== Personal life ==
Murphy married to Anne Cook in 1955. They raised three children, and have seven grandchildren.

Murphy died on November 22, 2024 at a hospital in Manhattan, New York City at the age of 95.

Diplomatic posts
Preceded by Hugh H. Smythe	U.S. Ambassador to Syria; 1974–1978	Succeeded by Talcott W. Seelye
Preceded by David D. Newsom	United States Ambassador to the Philippines; 1978–1981	Succeeded by Michael Armacost
Preceded by Robert G. Neumann	United States Ambassador to Saudi Arabia; 1981–1983	Succeeded by Walter Leon Cutler
Government offices
Preceded by Nicholas A. Veliotes	Assistant Secretary of State for Near Eastern and South Asian Affairs; October 28, 1983 – May 15, 1989	Succeeded by John Hubert Kelly
