= Keith Foote Nyborg =

American businessman (1930–2019)

21st United States Ambassador to Finland
- In office September 18, 1981 – February 17, 1986
- President: Ronald Reagan
- Preceded by: James Goodby
- Succeeded by: Rockwell A. Schnabel

Personal details
- Born: March 4, 1930 Ashton, Idaho, U.S.
- Died: September 15, 2019 (aged 89) Ashton, Idaho, U.S.
- Party: Republican

Keith Foote Nyborg (March 4, 1930 – September 15, 2019) was an American businessman who served as the United States Ambassador to Finland from 1981 to 1986.

He died on September 15, 2019, in Ashton, Idaho at age 89.
