= Peter A. Selfridge =

American government official (born 1971)

Peter Selfridge
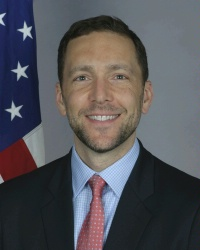

31st Chief of Protocol of the United States
- In office May 13, 2014 – January 20, 2017
- President: Barack Obama
- Preceded by: Capricia Marshall
- Succeeded by: Sean Lawler

Personal details
- Born: 1971 (age 54–55)
- Education: University of Iowa; Johns Hopkins University

Peter A. Selfridge (born 1971) is a former U.S. public servant who served as the United States Chief of Protocol from 2014 to 2017. In this role, he served as the link between the White House and foreign ambassadors and visiting dignitaries. In addition, his office managed Blair House, the official guesthouse of the President of the United States.

== Early life and education ==
Raised in Minnesota, the 1989 Minnetonka High School grad went on to receive a B.A. from the University of Iowa and a Master of Public Policy from Johns Hopkins University. He is of German, Irish, and Scottish heritage.

== Career ==
From 1993 to 1995, he served as a Legislative Correspondent and Staff Assistant in the office of Senator Tom Harkin.

Selfridge first served in the White House from 1995 to 1997, as Director of Scheduling Correspondence and Deputy Director in the Office of Scheduling and Advance, in President Bill Clinton's scheduling office.

Leaving the Clinton administration in 1997, he served as a Policy Analyst for the City of New York, Department of Citywide Administrative Services before leaving to become a Media Logistics Coordinator for the Gore-Lieberman campaign in 2000. Following the 2000 Presidential Election, he became a Senior Associate and Associate at Citigate Communications/Citigate Sard Verbinnen from 2001 to 2003. He left that position to serve as Associate Director in the Office of Scheduling and Advance for John Kerry for President. Beginning in 2005 he worked as the City Director for Los Angeles at the Clinton Climate Initiative and as a Public Affairs Consultant until 2007.

Selfridge served as Deputy Director of Advance for both the Presidential Transition Office and Obama for America from 2008 to early 2009. Following the Obama team into the White House, he served as Director of Advance for the Vice President until 2011, when he became a Deputy Assistant to the President and Director of Advance and operations at the White House, a position he held until 2011 when he became Director—a position he held until his nomination to the Office of Chief of Protocol in the State Department.

He was nominated by President Obama to be Chief of Protocol on December 12, 2013. With support from both of Minnesota's Democratic Senators Amy Klobuchar and Al Franken, the Senate confirmed Selfridge's nomination by voice vote on May 5, 2014. He succeeded Natalie Jones who was acting Chief of Protocol after Capricia Marshall left the post on August 1, 2013.

He was sworn in as Chief of Protocol on May 13, 2014.

== Personal life ==
In 2007, he married Parita Shah, the daughter of Gujarathi immigrants.

Political offices
Preceded by Natalie Jones; Acting	Chief of Protocol of the United States; 2014–2017	Succeeded by Sean Lawler
