= Chief of Protocol of the United States =

U.S. government position

Chief of Protocol
- Seal of the United States Department of State

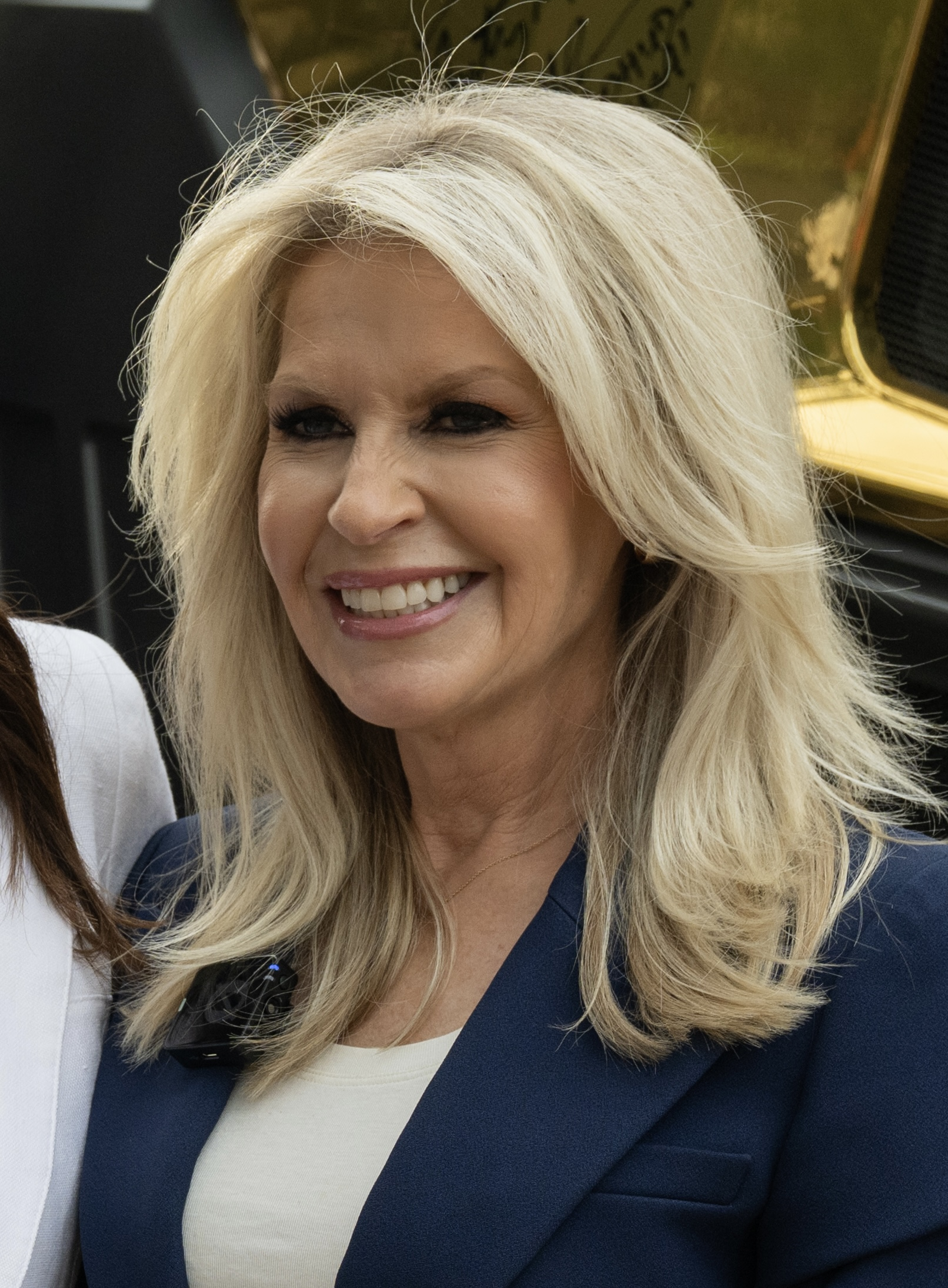
- Incumbent; Monica Crowley since May 30, 2025
- Reports to: United States Secretary of State
- Nominator: President of the United States
- Inaugural holder: James Clement Dunn
- Formation: 1928
- Website: Official website

In the United States, the chief of protocol is an officer of the United States Department of State responsible for advising the president of the United States, the vice president of the United States, and the United States secretary of state on matters of national and international diplomatic protocol. The chief of protocol holds the rank of ambassador and assistant secretary of state. All chiefs of protocol since 1961 have held the rank of ambassador.

== Duties ==
The chief arranges itineraries for foreign dignitaries visiting the U.S. and accompanies the president on all official international travel. Additionally, the office is responsible for accrediting foreign diplomats and publishing the list of foreign consular offices in the U.S., organizing ceremonies for treaty signings, conducting ambassadorial swearing-in and state arrival ceremonies, and maintaining Blair House, the official guest house for state visitors.

The chief of protocol duties include being present at the annual State of the Union speech (SOTU) given by the president each January before Congress. These SOTU duties include escorting the dean of the Diplomatic Corps into the House Chamber for the SOTU speech.

The chief of protocol position should not be confused with the separate White House social secretary position.

== Divisions ==
The office identifies six divisions on its website, led by assistant chiefs, who oversee the following principal duties:

- Management
- Visits
- Ceremonials
- Diplomatic Affairs
- Blair House
- Major Events

== List of chiefs of protocol of the United States ==
#	Image	Name	Assumed office	Left office	President served under
1		James Clement Dunn	February 4, 1928	November 17, 1930	Calvin Coolidge; Herbert Hoover
2		F. Lammot Belin	November 17, 1930	September 15, 1931	Herbert Hoover
3		Warren Delano Robbins	September 15, 1931	June 11, 1933	Herbert Hoover
4		James Clement Dunn	June 11, 1933	April 11, 1935	Franklin D. Roosevelt
5		Richard Southgate	April 11, 1935	July 29, 1937	Franklin D. Roosevelt
6		George T. Summerlin	July 29, 1937	January 15, 1944	Franklin D. Roosevelt
7		Stanley Woodward	January 15, 1944	May 22, 1950	Franklin D. Roosevelt; Harry S. Truman
8		John F. Simmons	August 18, 1950	January 31, 1957	Harry S. Truman; Dwight D. Eisenhower
9		Wiley T. Buchanan Jr.	February 4, 1957	January 23, 1961	Dwight D. Eisenhower
10		Angier Biddle Duke	January 24, 1961	January 20, 1965	John F. Kennedy; Lyndon B. Johnson
11		Lloyd Nelson Hand	January 21, 1965	March 21, 1966	Lyndon B. Johnson
12		James W. Symington	March 22, 1966	March 31, 1968	Lyndon B. Johnson
13		Angier Biddle Duke	April 1, 1968	September 26, 1968	Lyndon B. Johnson
14		Tyler Abell	September 30, 1968	January 20, 1969	Lyndon B. Johnson
15		Emil Mosbacher	January 21, 1969	June 30, 1972	Richard Nixon
-		Marion H. Smoak	July 1, 1972	March 1, 1974 (acting)	Richard Nixon
16		Marion H. Smoak	March 1, 1974	March 30, 1974	Richard Nixon
17		Henry E. Catto Jr.	April 3, 1974	July 1, 1976	Richard Nixon; Gerald Ford
18		Shirley Temple Black	July 1, 1976	January 21, 1977	Gerald Ford
19		Evan Dobelle	March 2, 1977	May 22, 1978	Jimmy Carter
20		Edith H. J. Dobelle	November 3, 1978	September 26, 1979	Jimmy Carter
21		Abelardo L. Valdez	October 19, 1979	January 21, 1981	Jimmy Carter
-		Morgan Mason (acting)	January 21, 1981	March 20, 1981	Ronald Reagan
22		Leonore Annenberg	March 20, 1981	January 6, 1982	Ronald Reagan
23		Selwa Roosevelt	April 16, 1982	January 20, 1989	Ronald Reagan
24		Joseph Verner Reed Jr.	May 21, 1989	October 21, 1991	George H. W. Bush
25		John Giffen Weinmann	October 31, 1991	January 20, 1993	George H. W. Bush
26		Molly M. Raiser	September 14, 1993	July 24, 1997	Bill Clinton
27		Mary Mel French	November 13, 1997	January 20, 2001	Bill Clinton
28		Donald Ensenat	June 6, 2001	February 18, 2007	George W. Bush
-		Raymond P. Martinez (acting)	February 18, 2007	September 14, 2007	George W. Bush
29		Nancy Brinker	September 14, 2007	January 20, 2009	George W. Bush
30		Capricia Marshall	August 3, 2009	August 1, 2013	Barack Obama
-		Natalie Jones (acting)	August 1, 2013	May 13, 2014	Barack Obama
31		Peter A. Selfridge	May 13, 2014	January 20, 2017	Barack Obama
-	Post vacant (January 20, 2017 – December 1, 2017)				
32		Sean Lawler	December 1, 2017	July 9, 2019	Donald Trump
-		Mary-Kate Fisher (acting)	June 24, 2019	August 12, 2019	Donald Trump
33		Cam Henderson	August 12, 2019	January 20, 2021	Donald Trump
-		Asel Roberts (acting)	January 20, 2021	January 3, 2022	Joe Biden
34		Rufus Gifford	January 3, 2022	July 28, 2023	Joe Biden
-		Ethan Rosenzweig (acting)	August 1, 2023	January 20, 2025	Joe Biden
35		Monica Crowley	May 30, 2025	Present	Donald Trump

== See also ==
- Chief of protocol
- Diplomatic rank
- Protocol (diplomacy)
- United States order of precedence
