= Molly M. Raiser =

American politician

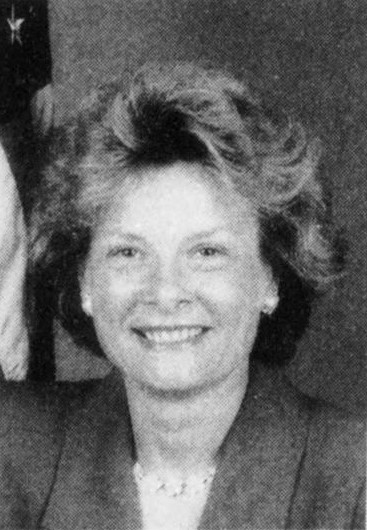

26th Chief of Protocol of the United States
- In office September 14, 1993 – July 24, 1997
- President: Bill Clinton
- Preceded by: John Giffen Weinmann
- Succeeded by: Mary Mel French

Mary "Molly" M. Raiser served as the United States Chief of Protocol from September 14, 1993 to July 24, 1997 under President Bill Clinton. She succeeded John Giffen Weinmann and was succeeded by Mary Mel French.

Currently, she is a Commissioner of the Women's Refugee Committee, a part of the International Rescue Committee. Previously she served as Chair of the United Nations High Commissioner for Refugees.
