= James Goodby =

American diplomat

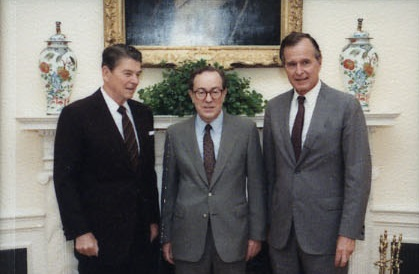
- Goodby (middle) in 1984
- Born: James Eugene Goodby; December 20, 1929 (age 96); Providence, Rhode Island, U.S.
- Education: Harvard University; University of Michigan
- Occupation: Author

James Eugene Goodby (born December 20, 1929) is an author and former American diplomat.

Goodby was born in Providence, Rhode Island. He graduated from Harvard University with an A.B. in 1951 and served as a second lieutenant in the Air Force during the Korean War from 1952–53. He attended the University of Michigan (1951–52) and Harvard University (1953–54).

Goodby served with the United States Army Corps of Engineers in Boston in 1951. After the war he became a Foreign Service Officer and remained in the Foreign Service until his retirement in 1989.

He was foreign affairs specialist with the United States Atomic Energy Commission in 1954–59, foreign affairs officer in the Office of Special Assistant to the Secretary of State for Atomic Energy in 1960, Officer in Charge of Nuclear Test Ban Negotiations at the U.S. Arms Control and Disarmament Agency in 1961–63; member of the Policy Planning Council at the Department of State in 1963–67; political officer at the United States Mission to the European Communities in Brussels in 1967–69; Officer in Charge of Defense Policy Affairs at the Bureau of European Affairs of the Department of State, in 1969–71; Counselor for Political Affairs at the United States Mission to the North Atlantic Treaty Organization in Brussels in 1971–74; Deputy Director of the Bureau of Politico-Military Affairs in 1974–77 (negotiating with NATO alliance partners as part of the Conference on Security and Cooperation in Europe to create the Helsinki Accords); and Deputy Assistant Secretary of State for European Affairs in 1977–80.

Goodby served as United States Ambassador to Finland (April 11, 1980 – August 18, 1981), and was vice chairman of the U.S. delegation to the Strategic Arms Reduction Talks (START). Goodby was appointed Ambassador to Greece, but his nomination not acted upon by the Senate and he later declined a recess appointment.

In 1993, Goodby returned from retirement to become the Chief U.S. Negotiator for the Safe and Secure Dismantlement of Nuclear Weapons. During this time he negotiated agreements with several former Soviet republics to dismantle nuclear weapons in those countries and to prevent nuclear weapons proliferation. He later won the 1st Annual Heinz Award in Public Policy for this work in 1995.

Goodby is currently Nonresident Senior Fellow at the Center for Northeast Asian Policy Studies at the Brookings Institution, a member of the Bipartisan Security Group, and Annenberg Distinguished Visiting Fellow at Stanford University's Hoover Institution.

== Publications (partial list) ==
- Europe Undivided: The New Logic of Peace in U.S.-Russian Relations, United States Institute of Peace Press, 1998
- The Nuclear Turning Point: A Blueprint for Deep Cuts and De-Alerting of Nuclear Weapons (contributor), Brookings Institution Press, 1999.
- The Gravest Danger: Nuclear Weapons, with Sidney D. Drell, Hoover Institution Press, 2003.
- A Strategy for Stable Peace: Toward a Euroatlantic Security Community, with Petrus Buwalda and Dmitri Trenin, Brookings, 2003.
- At the Borderline of Armageddon: How American Presidents Managed the Atom Bomb, Rowman & Littlefield, 2006.
- The War that Must Never be Fought, with George P. Shultz, Hoover Press, 2015.
- Approaching the Nuclear Tipping Point: Cooperative Security in an Era of Global Change, Rowman & Littlefield, 2017.
- Practical Lessons from US Foreign Policy: The Itinerant Years, with Kenneth Weisbrode, Palgrave Macmillan, 2020.

Diplomatic posts
| Preceded by Rozanne L. Ridgway | United States Ambassador to Finland; 1980–1981 | Succeeded by Keith Foote Nyborg |
