= John Hubert Kelly =

American diplomat (1939–2011)

John Kelly
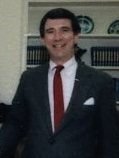
- Kelly in 1987

Personal details
- Born: July 20, 1939 Fond du Lac, Wisconsin, U.S.
- Died: September 15, 2011 (aged 72) Atlanta, Georgia, U.S.
- Education: Emory University

John Hubert Kelly

15th Assistant Secretary of State for Near Eastern and South Asian Affairs
- In office June 16, 1989 – September 30, 1991
- President: George H. W. Bush
- Preceded by: Richard W. Murphy
- Succeeded by: Edward Djerejian

John Hubert Kelly (July 20, 1939 – September 15, 2011) was an American diplomat.

== Biography ==
John Hubert Kelly was born in Fond du Lac, Wisconsin, on July 20, 1939. He attended Emory University, receiving a B.A. in 1961. He spent 1962 through 1965 working as a teacher, first in Danville, Virginia, then in Niles, Michigan.

Kelly entered the United States Foreign Service in 1964. His first posting was in Turkey, first in Adana, then in Ankara, where he worked from 1965 to 1967. He spent 1968 in Thai language instruction and was then posted to Songkhla from 1969 to 1971. He spent 1971–72 as a student at the Armed Forces Staff College. He spent 1972–73 working on political-military affairs in the Bureau of Intelligence and Research. In 1973, he was detailed to the United States Department of Defense as an expert on Thailand, and then spent 1974 working in the Bureau of Political-Military Affairs. He spent 1975–76 as Special Assistant to Counselor of the United States Department of State Helmut Sonnenfeldt. He returned to the field in 1976 and spent the next four years as a political-military officer in Paris. In 1981–82 he was the Una Chapman Cox Fellow and Diplomatic Associate at the Institute for the Study of Diplomacy at Georgetown University and worked on French defense and international terrorism.

Returning to the State Department, Kelly spent 1982–83 as Senior Deputy Assistant Secretary of State for Public Affairs and 1983–85 as Principal Deputy Assistant Secretary of State for European and Canadian Affairs. From 1985 to 1986, he was Short Terms Project Specialist in the Office of the Under Secretary of State for Management.

On July 17, 1986, President of the United States Ronald Reagan nominated Kelly as United States Ambassador to Lebanon, a post he held for the next two years. During this time Kelly played a minor role in the Iran-Contra scandal, where he interacted with key figures such as George Shultz, John Poindexter, and Oliver North. He returned to Washington, D.C., in 1988 to become Deputy Director of Policy Planning.

President George H. W. Bush then nominated Kelly as Assistant Secretary of State for Near Eastern and South Asian Affairs and Kelly held this office from June 16, 1989, until September 30, 1991. Kelly was the senior U.S. diplomat responsible for managing American policy in the Persian Gulf during the critical period leading up to Iraq’s invasion of Kuwait in August 1990. In February 1990, he visited Baghdad and held a two-and-a-half-hour meeting with President Saddam Hussein, during which Hussein expressed interest in the shifting geopolitical balance after the Cold War and made remarks about U.S. power in the Middle East.

Bush next nominated Kelly as United States Ambassador to Finland; he presented his credentials on December 20, 1991, and held this position until July 5, 1994.

Kelly later founded John Kelly Consulting, Inc., a consulting firm that provided its American clients with strategic, marketing and business advice for their overseas operations.

Diplomatic posts
Preceded by Reginald Bartholomew	United States Ambassador to Lebanon; 1986–1988	Succeeded by John Thomas McCarthy
Government offices
Preceded by Richard W. Murphy	Assistant Secretary of State for Near Eastern and South Asian Affairs; June 16, 1989 – September 30, 1991	Succeeded by Edward Djerejian
Diplomatic posts
Preceded by John Giffen Weinmann	United States Ambassador to Finland; December 20, 1991 – July 5, 1994	Succeeded by Derek Shearer
