= Sean Lawler =

American diplomat

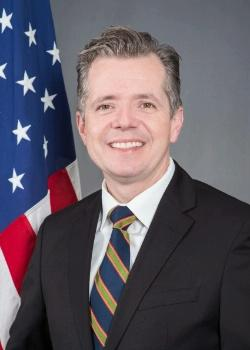

32nd Chief of Protocol of the United States
- In office December 1, 2017 – July 9, 2019
- President: Donald Trump
- Preceded by: Peter A. Selfridge
- Succeeded by: Cam Henderson

Personal details
- Born: Chicago, Illinois, U.S.
- Education: University of Maryland University College

Sean Patrick Lawler served as Chief of Protocol of the United States from December 2017 until July 2019.

== Career ==
Prior to assuming the role of Chief of Protocol, he was the Director for Visits, Planning, and Diplomatic Affairs at the National Security Council. On the NSC, he was actively involved in official foreign engagements with the President in the White House and abroad on behalf of the Assistant to the President for National Security Advisor (APNSA).

Before that, he led the Office of Visits and Protocol at the U.S. Cyber Command in Fort Meade, Maryland. A veteran with more than 21 years of service in the U.S. Navy, Lawler capped his military service as the Director of Administration at the Naval Support Facility Thurmont (Camp David) in Thurmont, Maryland. Earlier, he was the Administrative Department Leading Chief Petty Officer and Ship's Secretary on the USS John C. Stennis and he was an Executive Assistant to the Commander of the U.S. Pacific Fleet, Pearl Harbor, Hawaii and the Commander of U.S. Naval Forces Europe.

== Chief of Protocol ==
Lawler was confirmed by the Senate by voice vote on November 16, 2017, and sworn in as Chief of Protocol of the United States on December 1, 2017, with the rank of Ambassador. As part of his work, he led the Office of Protocol at the U.S. State Department to welcome visiting dignitaries to the United States. He also traveled with the president to facilitate foreign trips.

In June 2019, Lawler was accused of intimidating behavior towards staff and became the subject of an investigation by the State Department's Office of the Inspector General. He was suspended pending an official investigation on June 24, at which time his deputy, Mary-Kate Fisher, took over as Acting Chief of Protocol. Lawler resigned on July 9, 2019, and founded a consulting company, Fortitude Strategies, LLC.

== Personal life ==
Lawler was born and raised on the southwest side of Chicago and graduated from Bogan Computer Technical High School. Shortly after graduation, he enlisted in the U.S. Navy. He retired from the military in 2011 with the rank of Master Chief Yeoman. He earned a bachelor's degree in history from University of Maryland Global Campus and resides in Utah.

Political offices
Preceded by Peter A. Selfridge	Chief of Protocol of the United States; 2017–2019	Succeeded by Cam Henderson
