= Joelle Tanguy =

French-American medical nonprofit executive

- Education: HEC Paris; Stanford University Graduate School of Business
- Occupation: Director at Drugs for Neglected Diseases Initiative
- Years active: 1988-Present

Joelle Tanguy is a French / American medical nonprofit executive. Since 2018, she has served as the Director of External Affairs for the Drugs for Neglected Diseases Initiative. (DNDi).

== Background ==
Tanguy received her MBA from a joint program between HEC Paris and Stanford Graduate School of Business.

== Career ==
Tanguy was a dual-degree graduate of business and computer science, working in computer software sales in California, Europe, and Japan, when she was offered a sabbatical to hike in the Himalayas. The social differences she saw in comparison with her own life led her to apply for a position with Médecins Sans Frontières after the Armenian earthquake of 1988, which later led to coordinating relief missions in Uganda, Somalia, Zaire, Liberia, and the Balkan peninsula. By 2000, she was the Executive Director of the US branch. During this time, she briefly taught humanitarian affairs at Bard College.

After leaving Doctors Without Borders, Tanguy joined the TB Alliance as the founding Director of Advocacy and Public Affairs. She then served as the executive director for GAVI, the Vaccine Alliance, then under-secretary-general for the International Red Cross and Red Crescent. She then served as the Director of Partnerships and Advocacy at UN Women.

In 2018, Tanguy joined the founding team DNDi to help advance the cause of drug development against tropical and rare diseases.

In addition to roles with medical and civic organizations, Tanguy serves as an Executive-in-Residence of the Geneva Centre for Security Policy, and a board members for Human Rights Watch, Global Fund to Fight TB, AIDS, and Malaria, and the Access to Medicine Foundation.
