= Joseph Verner Reed Jr. =

American banker and diplomat

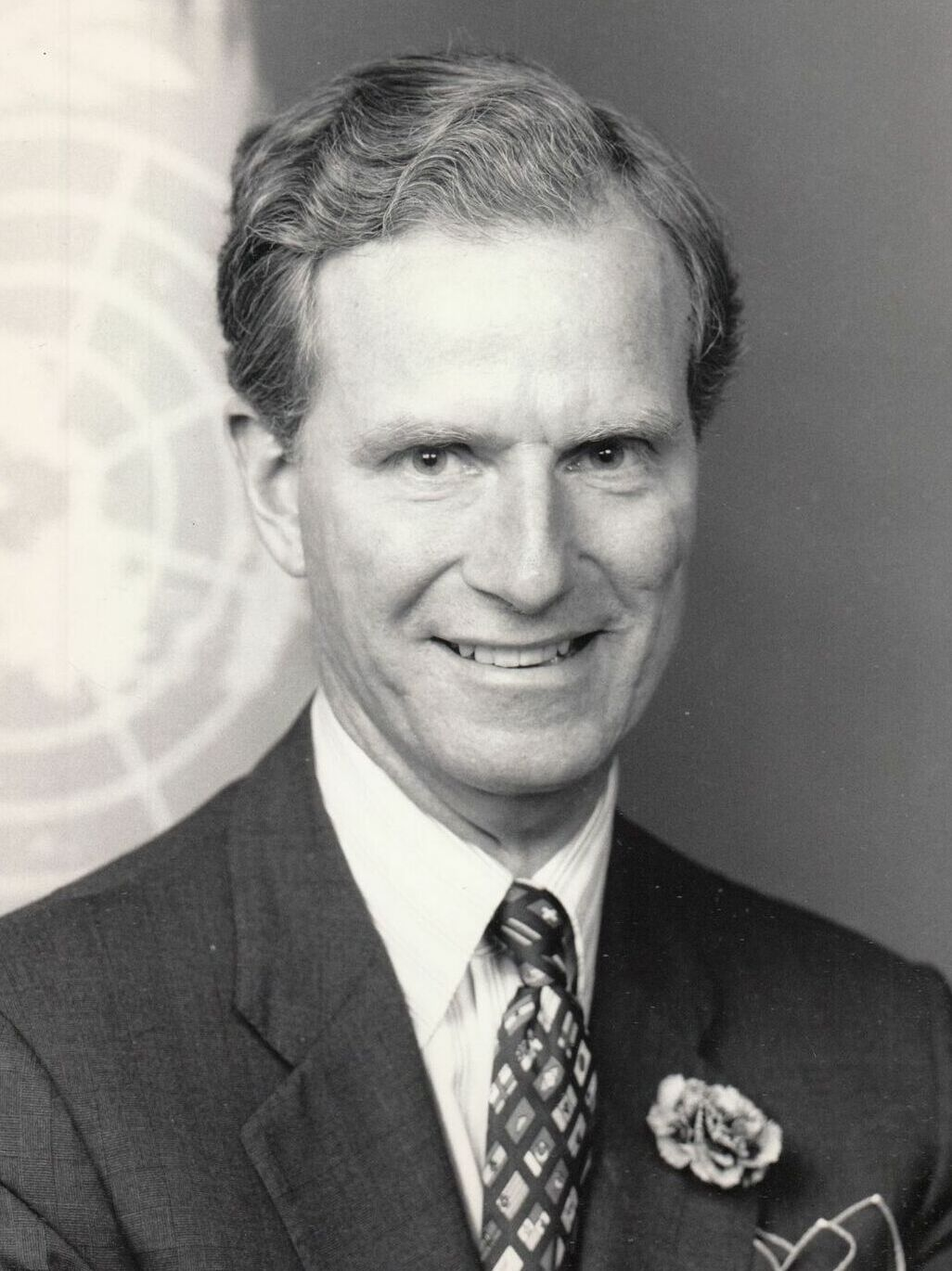
- Reed, c. 1987

24th Chief of Protocol of the United States
- In office May 21, 1989 – October 21, 1991
- President: George H. W. Bush
- Preceded by: Selwa Roosevelt
- Succeeded by: John Giffen Weinmann

United States Ambassador to Morocco
- In office 1981–1985
- President: Ronald Reagan
- Preceded by: Angier Biddle Duke
- Succeeded by: Thomas Anthony Nassif

Personal details
- Born: December 17, 1937 New York City, U.S.
- Died: September 29, 2016 (aged 78) Greenwich, Connecticut, U.S.
- Party: Republican
- Spouse: Marie Maude Byers
- Children: 2
- Relatives: Nathaniel Reed (brother); Verner Z. Reed (grandfather); Edward Doty (ancestor)
- Education: Deerfield Academy
- Alma mater: Yale University
- Occupation: Banker, diplomat

Joseph Verner Reed Jr. (December 17, 1937 – September 29, 2016) was an American banker and diplomat. He served as United States Ambassador to Morocco from 1981 to 1985, and as Chief of Protocol of the United States from 1989 to 1991.

== Early life ==
Joseph Verner Reed Jr. was born on December 17, 1937, in New York City. He was named after his father, Joseph Verner Reed (1902 - 1973). His paternal grandfather was Verner Zevola Reed (1863-1919). His mother was Permelia Pryor. He had a brother, Nathaniel Reed. and another brother Samuel Pryor Reed (1934-2005), manager at Engelhard Industries. He is also a descendant of Edward Doty (1599-1655), who emigrated to the United States on the Mayflower.

He grew up at Denbigh Farm in Greenwich, Connecticut, and Corsair in Hobe Sound, Florida. He was educated at the Deerfield Academy, a private boarding school in Deerfield, Massachusetts, and graduated from Yale University, a private university in New Haven, Connecticut, in 1961.

== Career ==
He started his career as private secretary to the president of the World Bank, Eugene "Gene" Robert Black, Sr. (1898-1992). He then was vice president and assistant to the chairman of the Chase Manhattan Bank, David Rockefeller, from 1963 to 1981.

In 1980 he ran "Project Alpha", a secret operation backed by David Rockefeller intended to give sanctuary in the US to the exiled Shah of Iran, and later to discouraging the new Iranian regime from releasing the American hostages before the 1980 election to help Ronald Reagan's chances of defeating President Carter. After the election Reed wrote to family that “I had given my all” to thwarting Carter’s efforts “to pull off the long-suspected ‘October Surprise,’” a reference to his activities in discouraging the Iranians from turning over the hostages to Carter.

In 1985, he became United States Deputy Permanent Representative to the Economic and Social Council of the United Nations. Two years later, in 1987, he became Under-Secretary-General of the United Nations for Political and General Assembly Affairs.

He was appointed by President Ronald Reagan to serve as United States Ambassador to Morocco from 1981 to 1985. He was then appointed by President George H. W. Bush to serve as the Chief of Protocol of the United States from 1989 to 1991.

He returned to the UN, serving as Under-Secretary-General of the United Nations and Special Representative for Public Affairs from 1992 to 1997. From 1997 to 2004, he served as President of the Staff-Management Coordination Committee of the UN. In January 2005, he was appointed as Under-Secretary-General and Special Adviser. He was re-appointed as such in 2009. He was a member of the Council on Foreign Relations.

He was the recipient of the Legion of Honour. He also received The Yale Medal from his alma mater, Yale University.

== Personal life ==
He married Marie Maude Byers, daughter of J. Frederic Byers (1939–1977) of Philadelphia, with whom they had two daughters, Serena (Reed) Kusserow and Electra Reed.

Reed died at Greenwich Hospital in Greenwich, Connecticut, on September 29, 2016.
