= Mary Pat Christie =

American investment banker and former First Lady of New Jersey

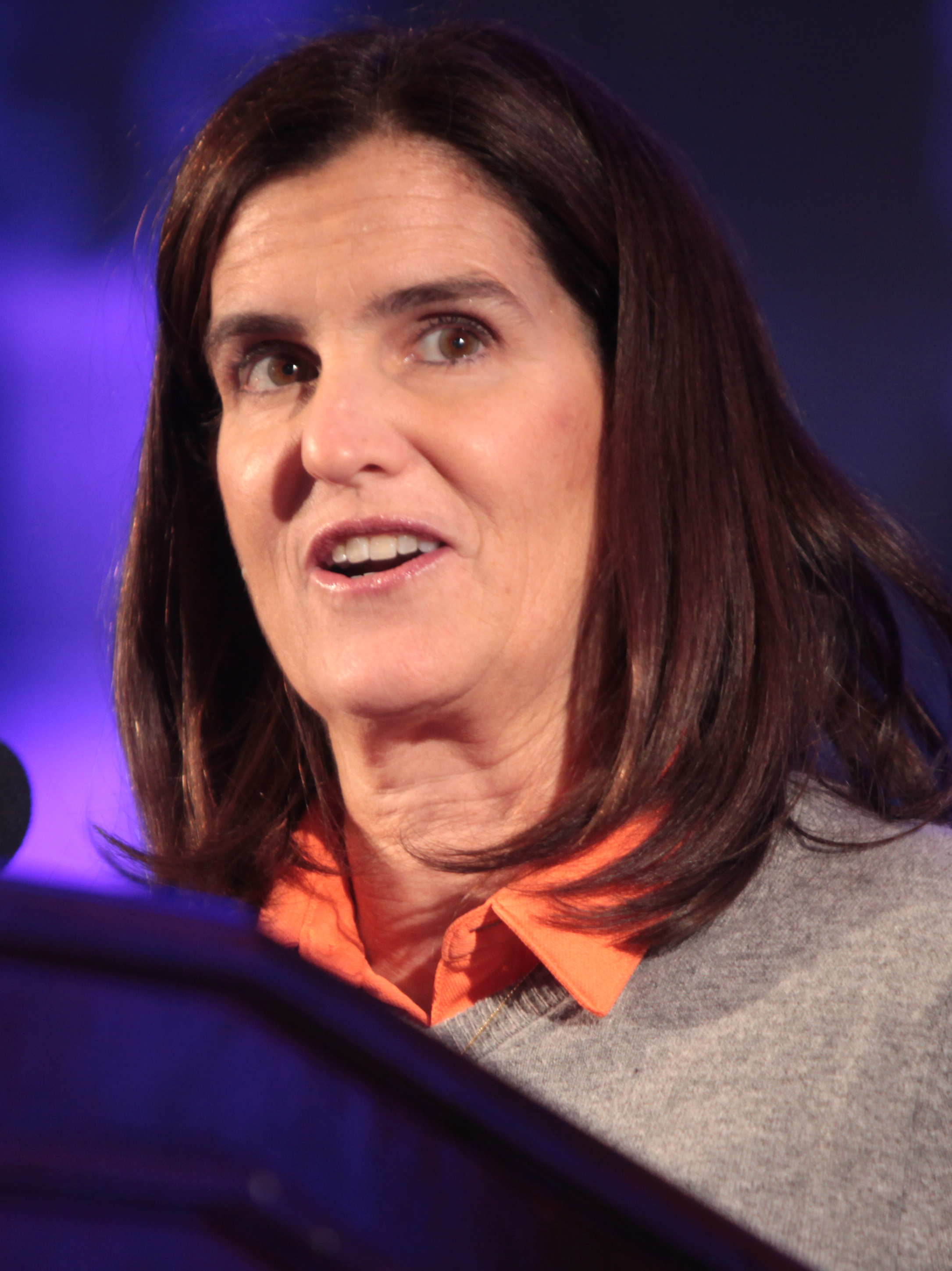
- Christie in 2016

First Lady of New Jersey
- In role January 19, 2010 – January 16, 2018
- Governor: Chris Christie
- Preceded by: Mary Jo Codey (2006)
- Succeeded by: Tammy Murphy

Personal details
- Born: Mary Pat Foster; September 15, 1963 (age 63) Paoli, Pennsylvania, U.S.
- Party: Republican
- Spouse: Chris Christie (m. 1986)
- Children: 4
- Education: University of Delaware (BA); Seton Hall University (MBA)

Mary Pat Christie (née Foster; born September 15, 1963) is an American investment banker who was the First Lady of New Jersey between 2010 and 2018. She is married to former New Jersey Governor and 2016 and 2024 presidential candidate Chris Christie.

== Early life and education ==
Christie was born to an Irish Catholic family in the Philadelphia suburb of Paoli, Pennsylvania, the ninth of 10 children. She was class president of the University of Delaware class of 1985 (her husband was president of the class of 1984). Christie earned her MBA at Seton Hall University in New Jersey.

== Marriage ==
The Christies, both then recent graduates of the University of Delaware, were married in 1986. As newlyweds, they shared a studio apartment in Summit, New Jersey. She and her husband have 4 children: Andrew (b. 1993), Sarah (b. 1996), Patrick (b. 2000) and Bridget (b. 2003). The family resides in Mendham Township.

Governor Christie has cited his wife's success as a bond trader as enabling him to have a relatively low-paid political career. When a colleague teased him about this, the Governor responded, "Listen, I just have three words for you: joint checking account. That money all lands in the same place, baby. It's fine by me."

Mary Pat insisted that the family not move to the New Jersey Governor's Mansion in Princeton, New Jersey, so that the children would not have to change schools.

== Career ==
Mary Pat Christie pursued a career in investment banking, eventually working at a Wall Street investment firm located two blocks from the World Trade Center. On the day of the September 11 attacks, she lost cell phone reception and was unable to contact her family.

She became a managing director at the Wall Street investment firm Angelo, Gordon & Co. She left her position with Angelo, Gordon & Co. in April 2015, stating that she wanted to spend more time with her family.

== Civic activity ==
When Hurricane Sandy devastated communities along the Jersey Shore in 2012, Mary Pat took a three-month leave from her job to set up and run the Hurricane Sandy New Jersey Relief Fund. Mary Pat heads the Hurricane Sandy New Jersey Relief Fund, the Drumthwacket Foundation and New Jersey Heroes.

She used her fundraising prowess again to assist Christie's campaign for President.

== Presidential campaign ==
Mary Pat accompanied the Governor as he campaigned in 2015. When he had to return to New Jersey in January 2016 as the blizzard of 2016 bore down on his state, Mary Pat stayed in New Hampshire and substituted for the Governor at scheduled campaign stops.
