= Protocol (diplomacy) =

Etiquette of diplomacy

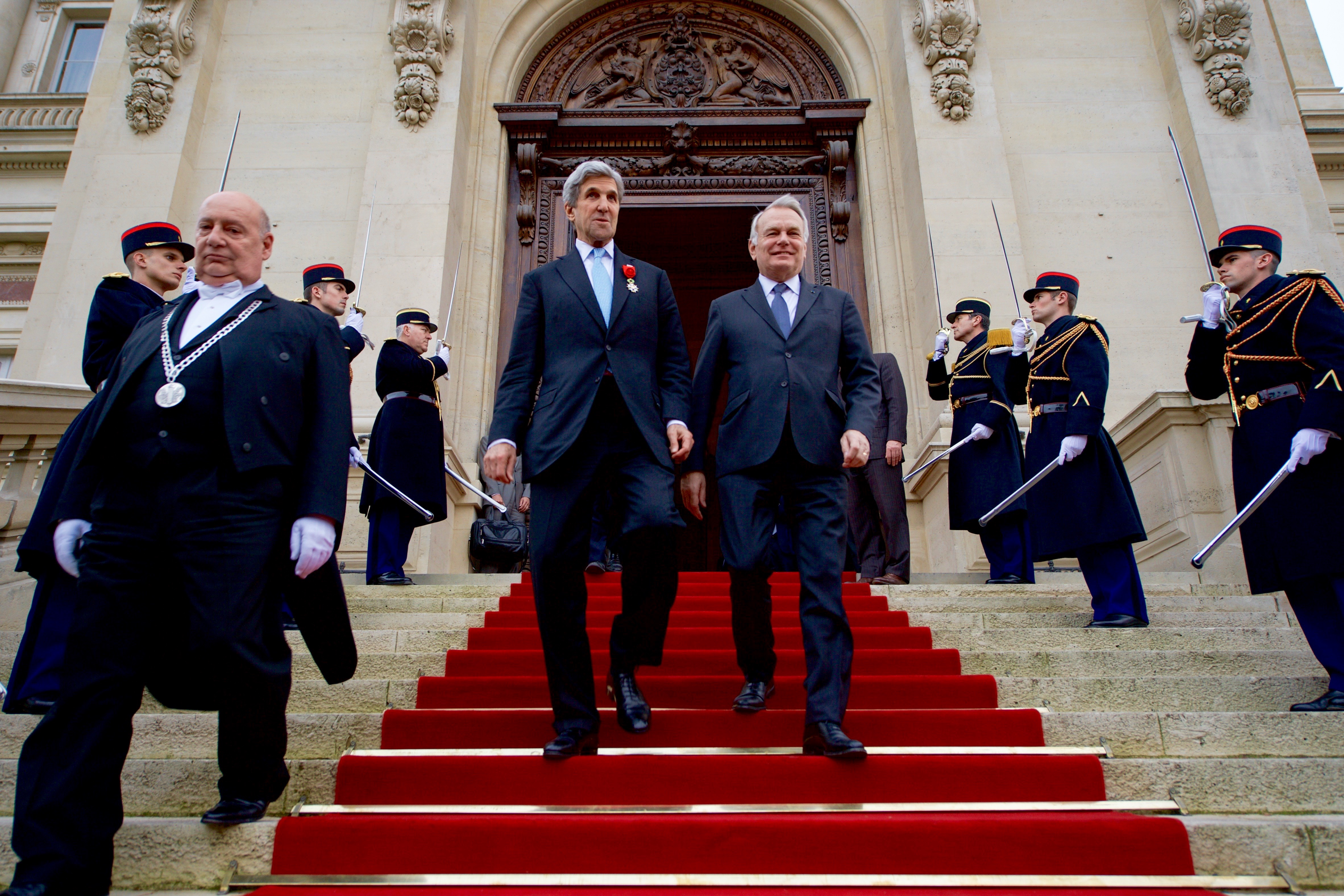
U.S. secretary of state John Kerry and French foreign minister Jean-Marc Ayrault leave the French Foreign Ministry at Quai d'Orsay after Ayrault awarded the secretary the Grand Officer of the Légion d'honneur, the second-highest level of the French award, during a ceremony on December 10, 2016.

In international politics, protocol is the etiquette of diplomacy and affairs of state. It may also refer to an international agreement that supplements or amends a treaty. A protocol is a rule which describes how an activity should be performed, especially in the field of diplomacy. In diplomatic services and governmental fields of endeavor protocols are often unwritten guidelines. Protocols specify the proper and generally accepted behavior in matters of state and diplomacy, such as showing appropriate respect to a head of state, ranking diplomats in chronological order of their accreditation at court, and so on. One definition is:

Protocol is commonly described as a set of international courtesy rules. These well-established and time-honored rules have made it easier for nations and people to live and work together. Part of protocol has always been the acknowledgment of the hierarchical standing of all present. Protocol rules are based on the principles of civility.—Dr. P.M. Forni on behalf of the International Association of Protocol Consultants and Officers.

== Definitions ==
There are two meanings of the word "protocol" in the context of international relations. In the legal sense, it is defined as an international agreement that supplements or amends a treaty. In the diplomatic sense, the term refers to the set of rules, procedures, conventions and ceremonies that relate to relations between states. In general, protocol represents the recognized and generally accepted system of international courtesy (comitas gentium).

The term protocol is derived, via French and Medieval Latin, from the Greek word πρωτόκολλον protokollon "first glued sheet of or onto a papyrus-roll". This comes from the act of gluing a sheet of paper to the front of a document to preserve it when it was sealed, which imparted additional authenticity to it. In the beginning, the term protocol related to the various forms of interaction observed in official correspondence between states, which were often elaborate in nature. In course of time, however, it has come to cover a much wider range of international relations.

The rules of protocol to create space where meetings can take place. As paradoxical as it may sound, the framework of protocol actually does not limit space, it creates it. By ensuring a smooth organisation, participants in an event and especially those acting as host, can focus on the content of the event without having to worry about the unexpected. In this sense, protocol functions not only as a constraint but as a communicative resource that enables and even promotes the interaction. Furthermore, its fixed structure provides a predictable framework for participants to exercise subtle forms of agency and relational signaling.

The other side of protocol: its symbolic value. The events and rituals, for example, of the formal start of the parliamentary year and the monarch’s speech in the United Kingdom are meant to symbolise the democratic values of the country. This is the case at every ceremony that more or less follows the same pattern, like the exchange of rings and vows at weddings or the receiving of a diploma at a graduation ceremony. Symbols add meaning to the community’s values but also credibility, strength and often also beauty.

== See also ==
- Chief of Protocol — an official in many national governments
  - Chief of Protocol of the United States — an officer of the U.S. Department of State
- Order of precedence

== Bibliography ==
- Jean Paul Wijers, Isabel Amaral, William Hanson, Bengt-Arne Hulleman, Diana Mather. Protocol to Manage Relationships Today: Modern Relationship Management Based Upon Traditional Values, Amsterdam University Press, ISBN 978-9463724159
- Gilbert Monod de Froideville & Mark Verheul. An Expert's Guide to International Protocol, Amsterdam University Press, ISBN 978-9462981058
- Serres, Jean, Practical Handbook of Protocol, 2010 Edition, Editions de la Bièvre, 3 avenue Pasteur - 92400 Courbevoie, France. ISBN 978-2-905955-04-3
- Serres, Jean, Manuel Pratique de Protocol, XIe Edition, Editions de la Bièvre, 3 avenue Pasteur - 92400 Courbevoie, France. ISBN 2-905955-03-1
- Forni, P.M. Choosing Civility: The 25 Rules of Considerate Conduct. New York: St. Martin’s Griffin Edition, October 2003. ISBN 0-312-28118-8.
- McCaffree, Mary Jane, Pauline Innis, and Richard M. Sand, Esquire. Protocol: The Complete Handbook of Diplomatic, Official and Social Usage, 35th Anniversary Edition. Center for Protocol Red Book Studies, LLC April 2013. ISBN 978-1-935451-16-7. www.protocolredbook.com
- Berkowitz, Roni, Gadi Heimann, and Zohar Kampf. Communicating through Protocols: The Case of Diplomatic Credential Ceremonies. International Political Sociology, Volume 18, Issue 2, June 2024. https://doi.org/10.1093/ips/olae013.
