= Hurricane Sandy New Jersey Relief Fund =

The Hurricane Sandy New Jersey Relief Fund was a relief fund created by Mary Pat Christie, the wife of Governor of New Jersey Chris Christie, to assist the victims of Hurricane Sandy, the major storm that devastated coastal communities in New Jersey in October/November 2012.

Mary Pat Christie responded by taking a 3-month leave of absence form her job to set up and run the Hurricane Sandy New Jersey Relief Fund. She enlisted U2 singer Bono and New Jersey's own Bruce Springsteen to help with fundraising.

Mary Pat recruited a board of directors with significant experience in disaster-relief, among them Chief Financial Officer, Anita Bhatt, who served as CFO for the Clinton Bush Haiti Fund, established after the 2010 earthquake.

The fund raised and distributed over $40 million in the two years following the storm, primarily helping New Jersey residents to rebuild their homes. as well as to assist small business owners hit by the storm.
