= 2026 state visit by Charles III to the United States =

2026 visit by the British monarch

State visit by Charles III to the United States
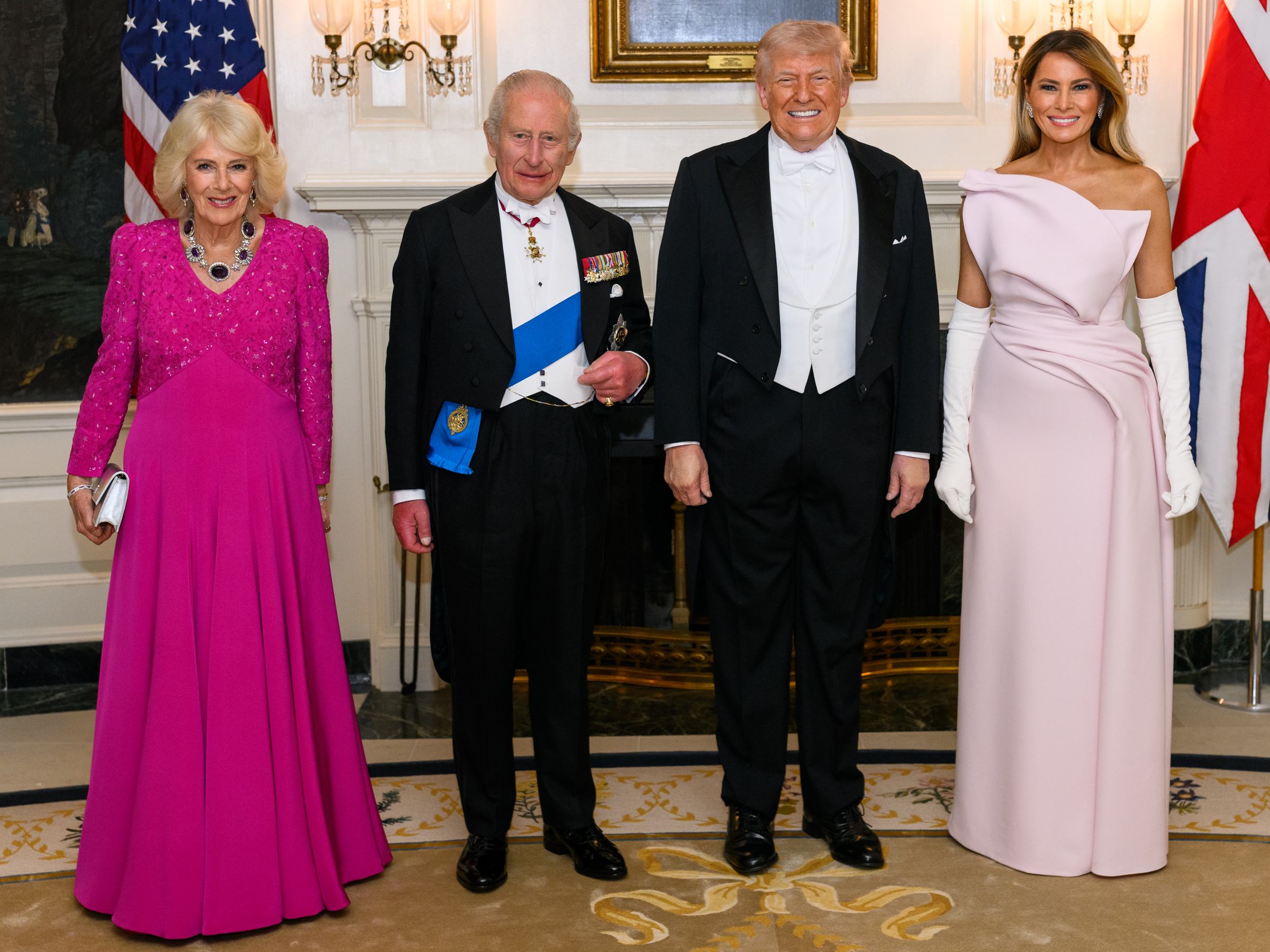
- Date: 27 to 30 April 2026
- Location: Washington, D.C., New York, and Virginia
- Type: State visit
- Participants: King Charles III; Queen Camilla

King Charles III of the United Kingdom and his wife Queen Camilla made a state visit to the United States from 27 to 30 April 2026, hosted by President Donald Trump. It reciprocated Trump's state visit to the United Kingdom in September 2025. It was the first state visit by a British monarch since May 2007, when Charles's mother Queen Elizabeth II was hosted by President George W. Bush. Trump had previously made two state visits to the United Kingdom in 2019 and 2025. This was the second state visit hosted by President Trump and the first of his second presidency.

== Background ==
The visit coincides with the United States Semiquincentennial, marking the 250th anniversary of the Declaration of Independence. Buckingham Palace stated that the trip would highlight the "historic connections and the modern bilateral relationship". The relationship between the King's brother, Andrew Mountbatten-Windsor, and Jeffrey Epstein has been the subject of hearings by the United States House Committee on Oversight and Government Reform.

Due to the 2026 US and Israeli war on Iran, several British MPs urged the prime minister, Keir Starmer, to cancel the King and Queen's state visit. This was because Trump's stance – which included threats to destroy Iranian civilisation – was seen as aggressive. The consequences of the war, including the blockade of the Strait of Hormuz, were perceived negatively by the UK, due to economic risks. Starmer said the King could use the visit to mend the rift between the two countries.

Charles did not meet his younger son, Prince Harry, or his family, who live in California, during the visit.

Trump wrote on Truth Social that he was "look[ing] forward to spending time with the King, whom I greatly respect. It will be TERRIFIC!" He later told the BBC that the King's state visit could "absolutely" help repair relations between the two countries.

=== Security ===
After a gunman attempted to enter the White House Correspondents' Dinner attended by the US president in Washington, D.C. on 25 April, Buckingham Palace confirmed that the state visit would still proceed, but that security arrangements had been reassessed and increased, with no specifics announced.

Following the shooting, Darren Jones, the Chief Secretary to the Prime Minister and Chancellor of the Duchy of Lancaster, said that the visit would have "appropriate security in place in relation to the risk". The Shadow Home Secretary, Chris Philp, said that it was vital for the King to be properly protected and urged both US and UK security teams to review the King's security arrangements.

Sean Coughlan, BBC News' royal correspondent, and Bernd Debusmann Jr, BBC News' White House reporter, both noted the "enormous security presence". These included a visible police presence around the White House; road closures, with an entire block of Pennsylvania Avenue closed to traffic; workers in nearby office buildings, including the Irish embassy, having their identification checked; barriers created by construction lorries and dump trucks parked across streets, including Pennsylvania Avenue; and a tent blocking the view of dignitaries entering and leaving vehicles. Debusmann remarked that it was a "rare measure that I’ve only seen on particularly high-profile visits, such as that of Israeli Prime Minister Benjamin Netanyahu or Ukrainian President Volodymyr Zelenskyy".

== Commentary ==
The visit was expected to address a number of diplomatic challenges within the "Special Relationship" between the United Kingdom and the United States. Stephen Bates of The Guardian wrote that it would take place amid American criticism of the British armed forces and the UK government's efforts to maintain the Special Relationship. Writing ahead of the visit, a BBC News journalist suggested that Charles would "have some heavy lifting to do" to ensure Trump viewed the UK and its government favourably. ITV News royal editor Chris Ship believed this visit would be "the most risky diplomatic trip of King Charles' reign so far". On the first day of the visit, remarks made to British students in February 2026 by the British ambassador to the US, Christian Turner, were made public by the Financial Times; these included comments criticising the lack of response to the Epstein files in the US (as compared to the UK), as well as comments that the term "special relationship" as used to describe US-UK relations "quite nostalgic, it's quite backwards-looking, and it has a lot of baggage about it". He also added that "I think there is probably one country that has a special relationship with the United States — and that is probably Israel".

US congressman Ro Khanna criticised the decision not to meet victims of Epstein, arguing that it could damage the monarchy's credibility in the United States. However, the ongoing police investigation into Andrew's links with Epstein would prevent such a meeting from taking place. A Buckingham Palace source told BBC News that "We fully understand and appreciate the survivors' position, but can only reiterate that our position is clear that anything that could potentially impact on ongoing police inquiries and assessments, and any potential legal action that could result from that, would be to the detriment of the survivors themselves in their pursuit of justice".

Following the state visit, according to a YouGov poll, 74% of Britons thought the King had handled the visit well.

== Visit and itinerary ==
The King and Queen visited Washington, D.C., New York City, and Virginia. They stayed at Blair House, opposite the White House, known as "The President's Guest House".

=== 27 April (Monday) ===
On 27 April, King Charles and Queen Camilla travelled on the UK Government Airbus A321LR operated by Titan Airways to Joint Base Andrews, a United States military facility in Prince George's County, Maryland. They were first met by Monica Crowley, the Chief of Protocol of the United States, then by Sir Christian Turner, the British Ambassador to the United States. On arriving at the White House, they were received by the President and First Lady at the South Portico. A photograph of the Trumps greeting the King and Queen showed a painting behind them depicting the raised-fist image taken after the attempted assassination of Donald Trump in Pennsylvania in July 2024 during the 2024 presidential election. The royals and the Trumps then had afternoon tea in the Green Room on the State Floor. Afterwards, the Trumps gave the King and Queen a tour of the South Lawn, which included a visit to a newly expanded beehive in the shape of the White House near the White House Kitchen Garden.

The King and Queen then left the White House for a garden party at the British embassy. The menu, organised by the embassy's Head Chef, Craig Harnden, included scones and 3,000 sandwiches in four varieties: egg mayonnaise, cucumber, Scottish smoked salmon, and roast beef with horseradish. BBC News noted that the use of British roast beef carried wider UK-US political and trade symbolism, as tariffs had recently been dropped by the US. The party had 650 guests "representing the connection between the US and UK". Guests included US Treasury Secretary Scott Bessent, former Speaker of the House Nancy Pelosi, CEO of the National Center for Missing & Exploited Children Michelle DeLaune, and retired Olympic diver Tom Daley. During the event, Queen Camilla met representatives from campaign groups against domestic abuse and violence against women, including Sandra Jackson, chief executive of House of Ruth. There had been calls for the royals to meet survivors of sex offender Jeffrey Epstein, but this did not take place "because of concerns about jeopardising the legal processes".

=== 28 April (Tuesday) ===
- President Trump Remarks at Welcome Ceremony for King Charles — C-SPAN coverage on YouTube

On 28 April, the Trumps hosted a State Arrival Ceremony on the South Lawn of the White House for the King and Queen, featuring military honours by the US Army Herald Trumpets, the UK and US national anthems by "The President's Own" US Marine Band, a 21-gun cannon salute by the Presidential Salute Battery, an inspection of the Troops, a speech delivered by President Trump, and a flypast. At the event, the King and Queen met with members of Trump's cabinet including Vice President JD Vance, Secretary of Defense Pete Hegseth and Secretary of State Marco Rubio.

After the ceremony, the royals participated in a pass in review of 300 US Service Members and 500 members of the US Armed Forces from all six military branches, a historic first for state visits.

The President and the King also held a bilateral meeting in the Oval Office which was not open to the media, while the First Lady and the Queen visited the White House Tennis Pavilion for an educational event with students exploring US–UK history and AI technology.

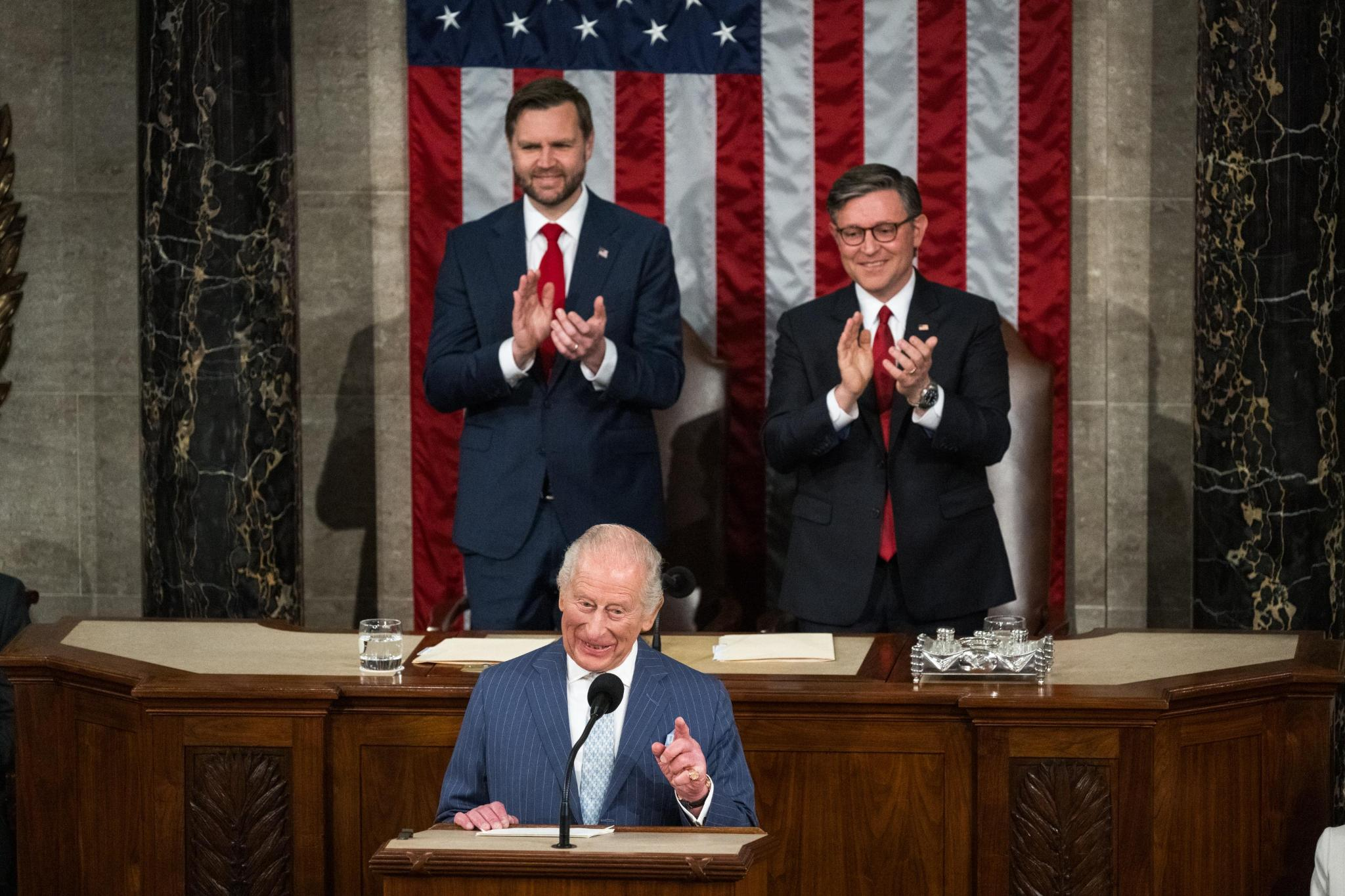

King Charles III addresses a joint meeting of the U.S. Congress on 28 April 2026.

The King addressed a joint meeting of the United States Congress. This was only the second address to a joint meeting of Congress by a British monarch, the first being Queen Elizabeth II's address in 1991. His speech received about a dozen standing ovations.

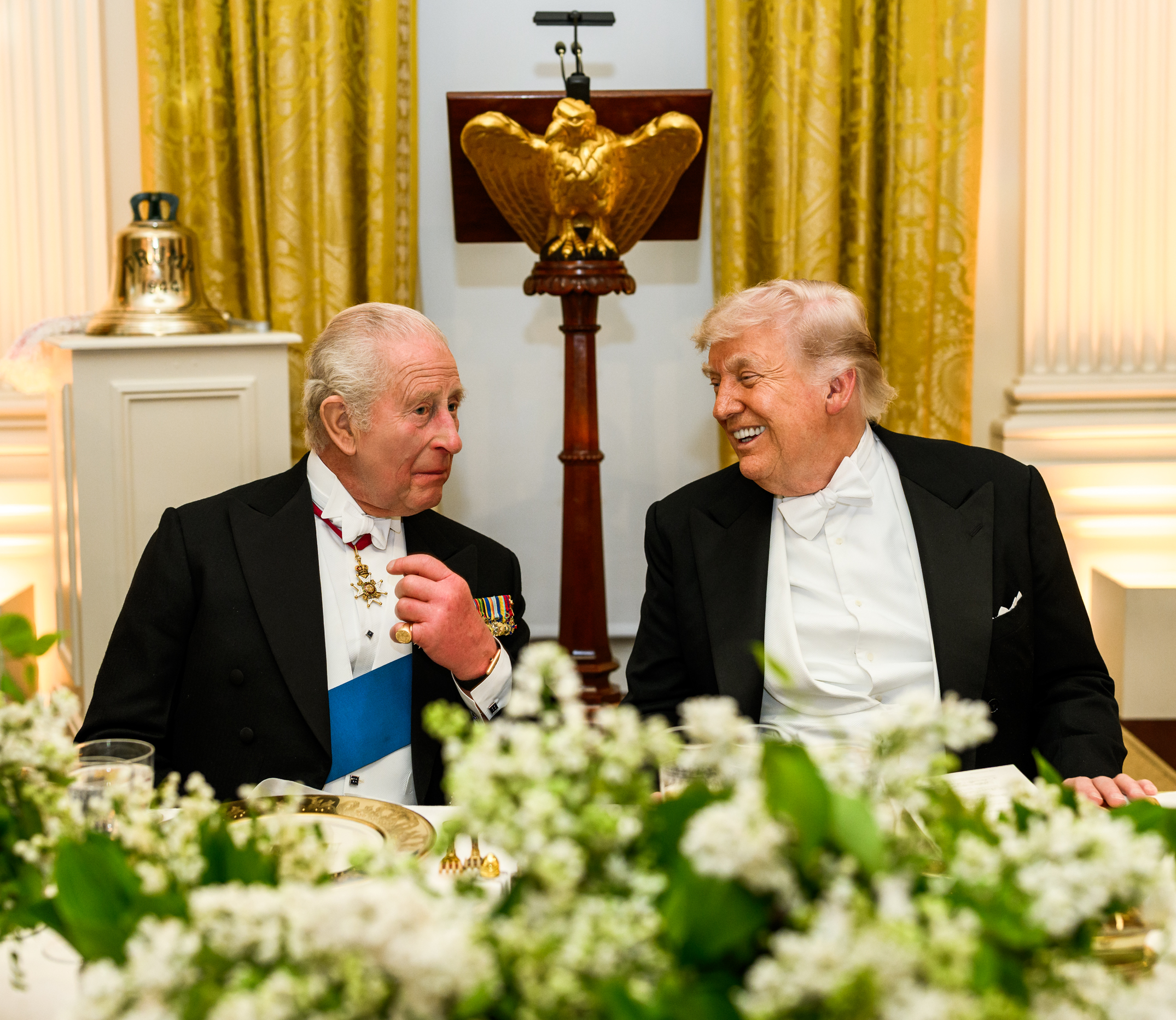
HMS Trump's bell (on pedestal in background), presented to Donald Trump by King Charles

External videos
- President Trump Toasts King Charles III at State Dinner — C-SPAN coverage on YouTube
- King Charles III Toasts President Trump at State Dinner — C-SPAN coverage on YouTube

A state banquet in honour of the King and Queen took place at the White House, with speeches by both the King and the President. Guests included UK Foreign Secretary Yvette Cooper, Amazon founder Jeff Bezos, his wife Lauren Sanchez Bezos, Apple CEO Tim Cook and recent Masters Tournament winner Rory McIlroy. The menu for the banquet included a First Course of Garden vegetable soup and Hearts of Palm salad, a Second Course of Herb ravioli filled with ricotta and morels, dressed in a parmesan emulsion, a Third Course of Dover sole meunière (a pan-fried French fish dish), Potato pavé, Spring ramps, Snow peas, and a Dessert consisting of a Flourless chocolate cake (in the shape of a beehive) served with White House honey and ice cream. During his speech, the King gifted the President with an original bell that once hung aboard the HMS Trump, joking that: "Should you ever need to get hold of us, well, just give us a ring!"

=== 29 April (Wednesday) ===
On 29 April, the royal couple travelled to New York City, where they visited the September 11 Memorial, and met first responders and families of victims. Charles and Mayor of New York City Zohran Mamdani met at the September 11 Memorial. Separately, Mamdani indicated a desire to encourage Charles to return the Koh-i-Noor diamond; however, it is not publicly known if Mamdani discussed the diamond with the King.

External videos
- The Queen's speech at the New York Public Library — Available to watch on The Royal Family's YouTube channel.

The Queen attended an event at the New York Public Library marking the centenary of Winnie-the-Pooh, with Queen Camilla completing the Library's stuffed toy collection of characters by presenting a specially made toy of Roo. The collection was originally owned by AA Milne's son and the inspiration for Christopher Robin, Christopher Robin Milne, however according to the Library , Roo was lost in the 1930s in an apple orchard, with the rest of the toys touring the US in 1947, and going on display in New York in 1956, and then on display in the Library in 1987. The original Roo was made by Farnell, which is now part of the toy manufacturer Merrythought, who were given the request to make the replacement Roo for Queen Camilla's visit to the Library. On her visit, the Queen was joined by Sarah Jessica Parker, Anna Wintour, Jenna Bush Hager and Gyles Brandreth for the event.

While the Queen was attending the Library's events, the King visited an education and healthy food initiative in Harlem called Harlem Grown, and later attended a UK-US Trade and Business event at the Rockefeller Center.

The King and Queen concluded their day in New York City at Christie's auction house for a reception held in partnership with the King's Trust. They were joined by a number of celebrities, including Lionel Richie, Anna Wintour, Charlotte Tilbury, and Donatella Versace.

To mark the royal visit, the Empire State Building and JPMorganChase Tower building were illuminated in the colours of the Union Jack.

=== 30 April (Thursday) ===
On 30 April, before travelling to Virginia, the King and Queen made their official farewells at the White House to President Trump and the First Lady. At the end of the state visit, Trump stated that "in honor of the King and Queen", he would lift tariffs on Scottish whisky. The couple then visited Arlington National Cemetery, where they laid a wreath at the Tomb of the Unknown Soldier and a gun salute was fired.

The King and Queen travelled to Front Royal, Virginia, where they attended a block party organised by America250 that included performances by Appalachian cultural groups. The King subsequently visited Shenandoah National Park, while the Queen toured Smitten Farm, a local farm focused on horseracing.

After the state visit, Charles departed from Joint Base Andrews in Maryland. He travelled alone to Bermuda for a royal visit, the first of his reign to a British Overseas Territory.

== Gallery ==
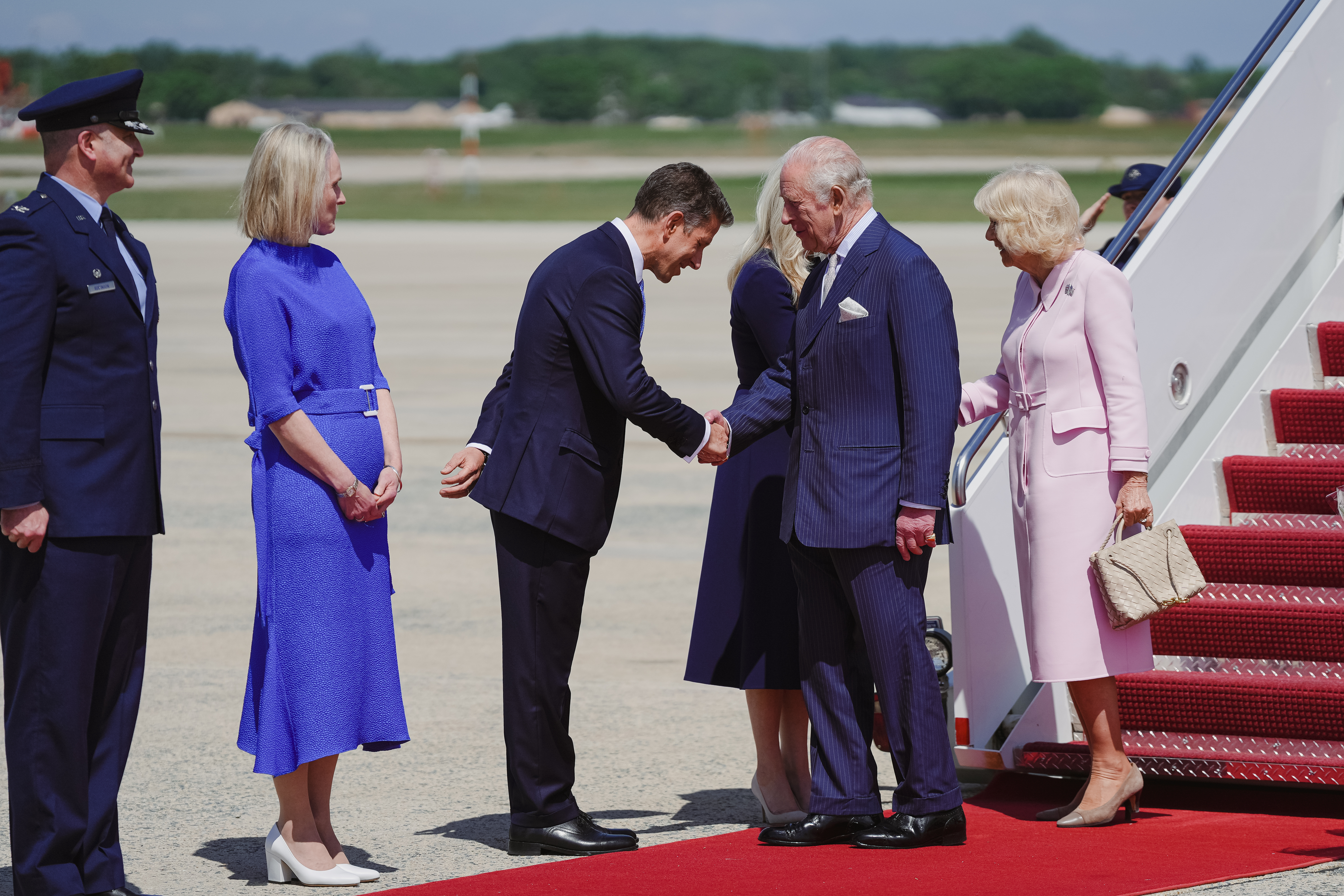
King Charles III and Queen Camilla arriving at Joint Base Andrews

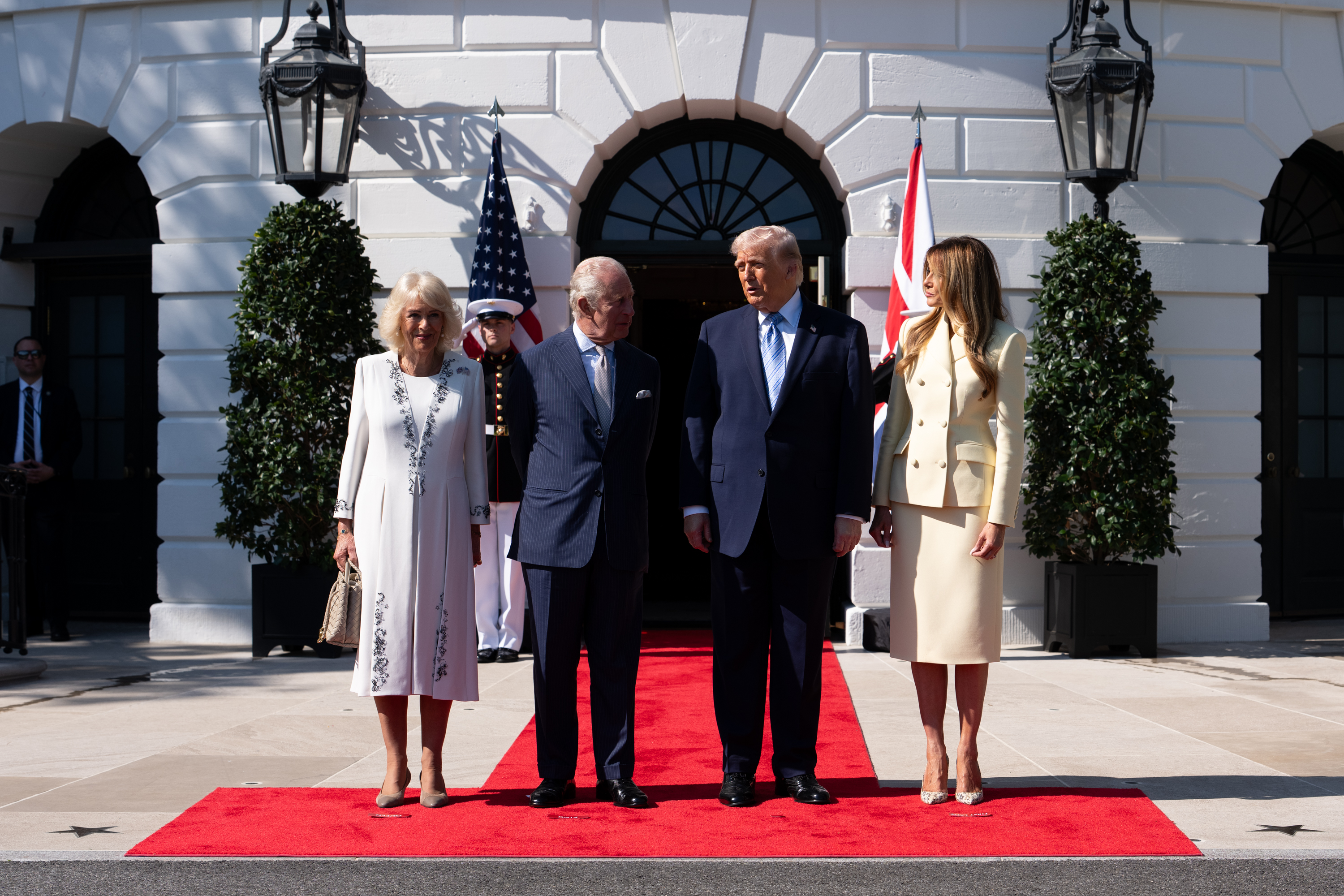
The King and Queen being received by President Trump and First Lady Melania Trump at the South Portico of the White House

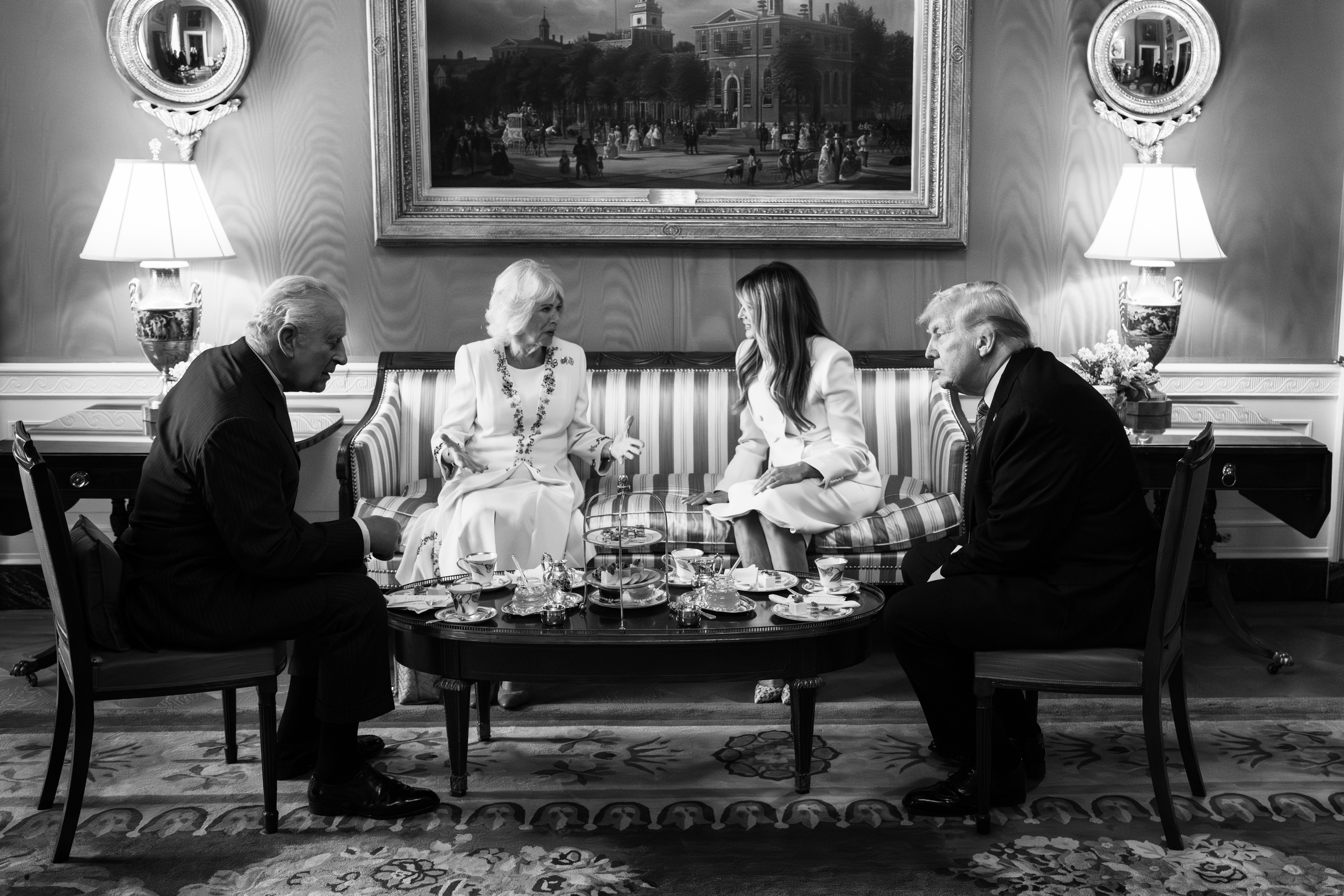
The President and the First Lady hosting the King and Queen for afternoon tea in the Green Room

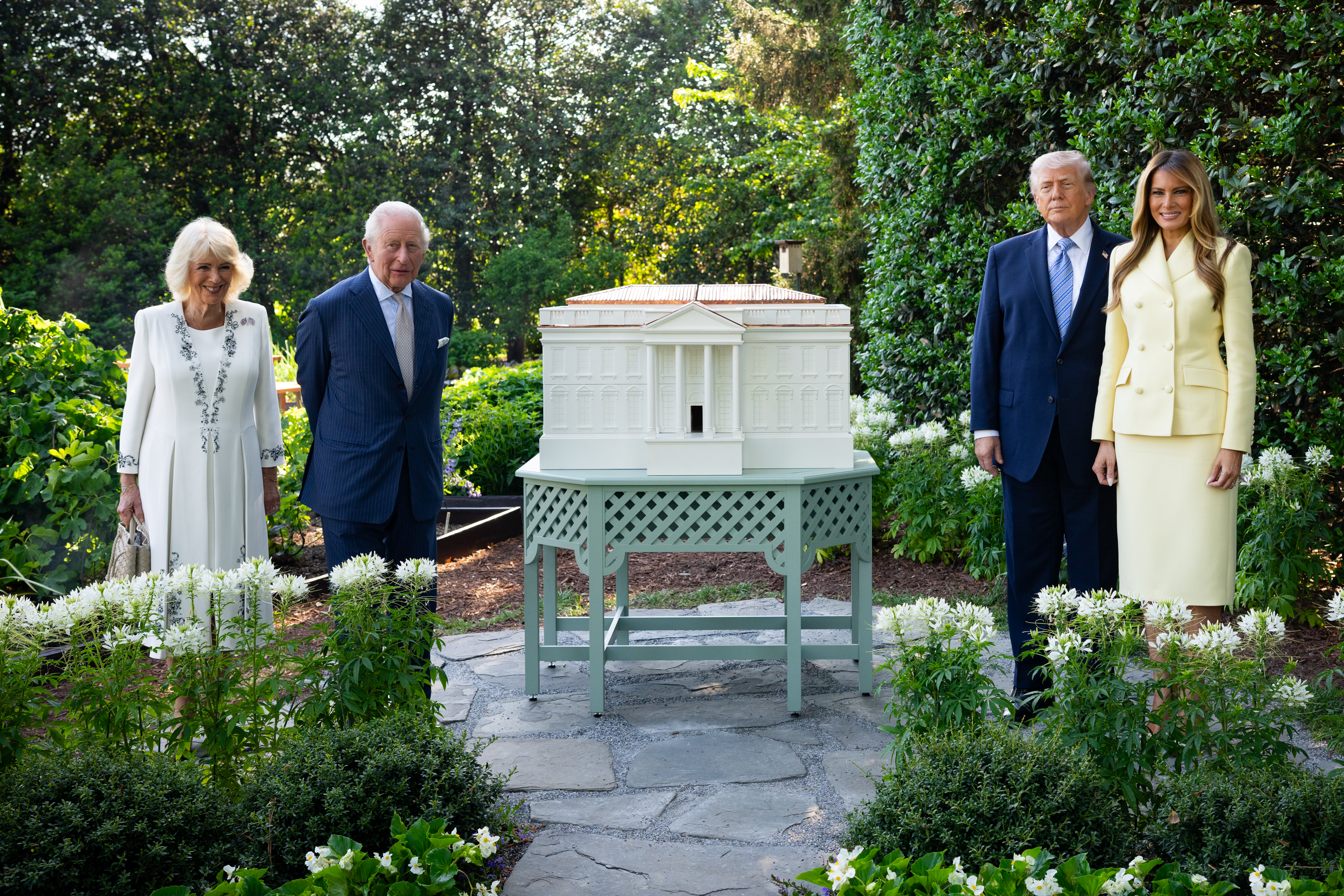
The Trumps giving the King and Queen a tour of the South Lawn, which included a visit to a newly expanded beehive in the shape of the White House

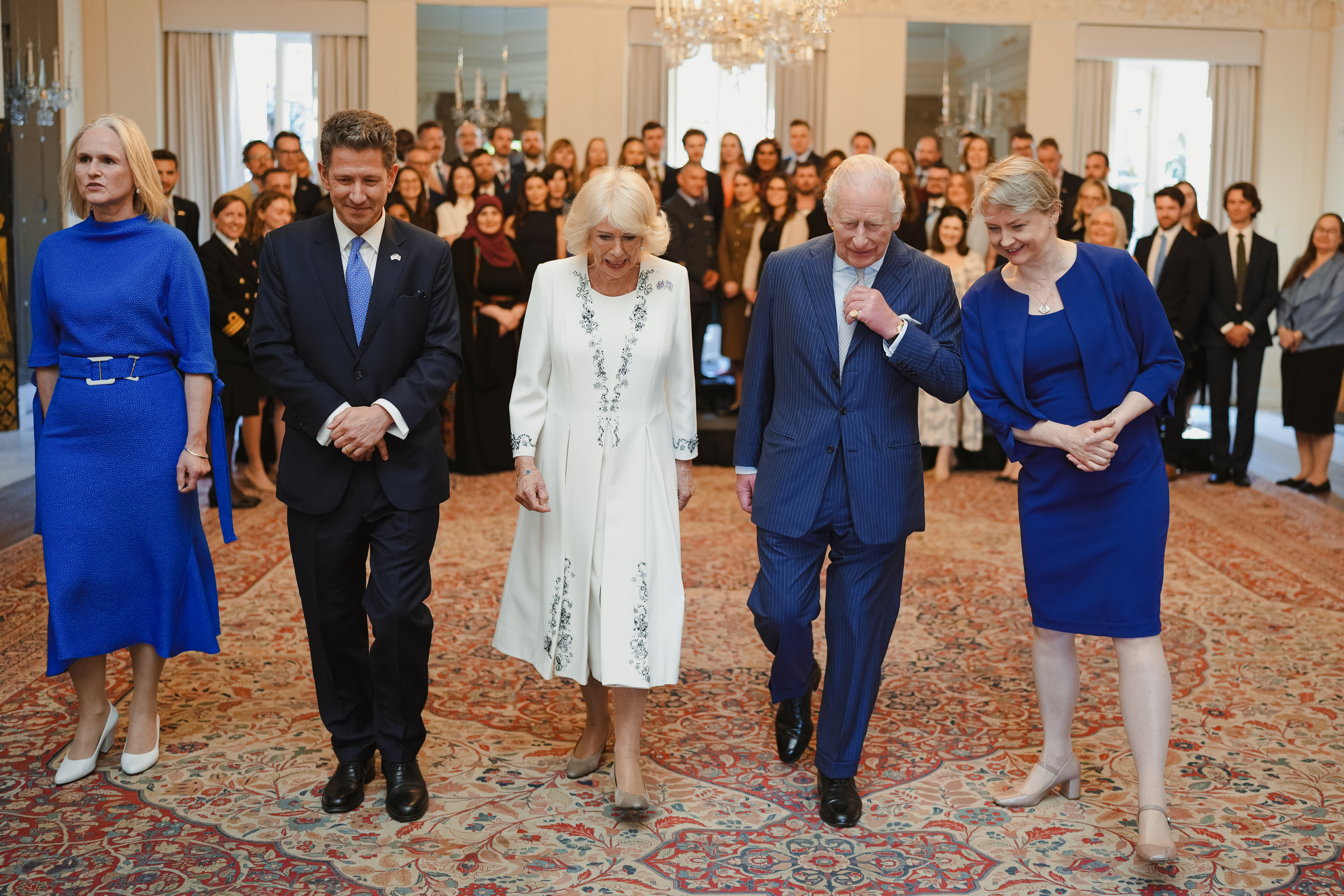
The King and Queen at the British embassy in Washington, D.C.

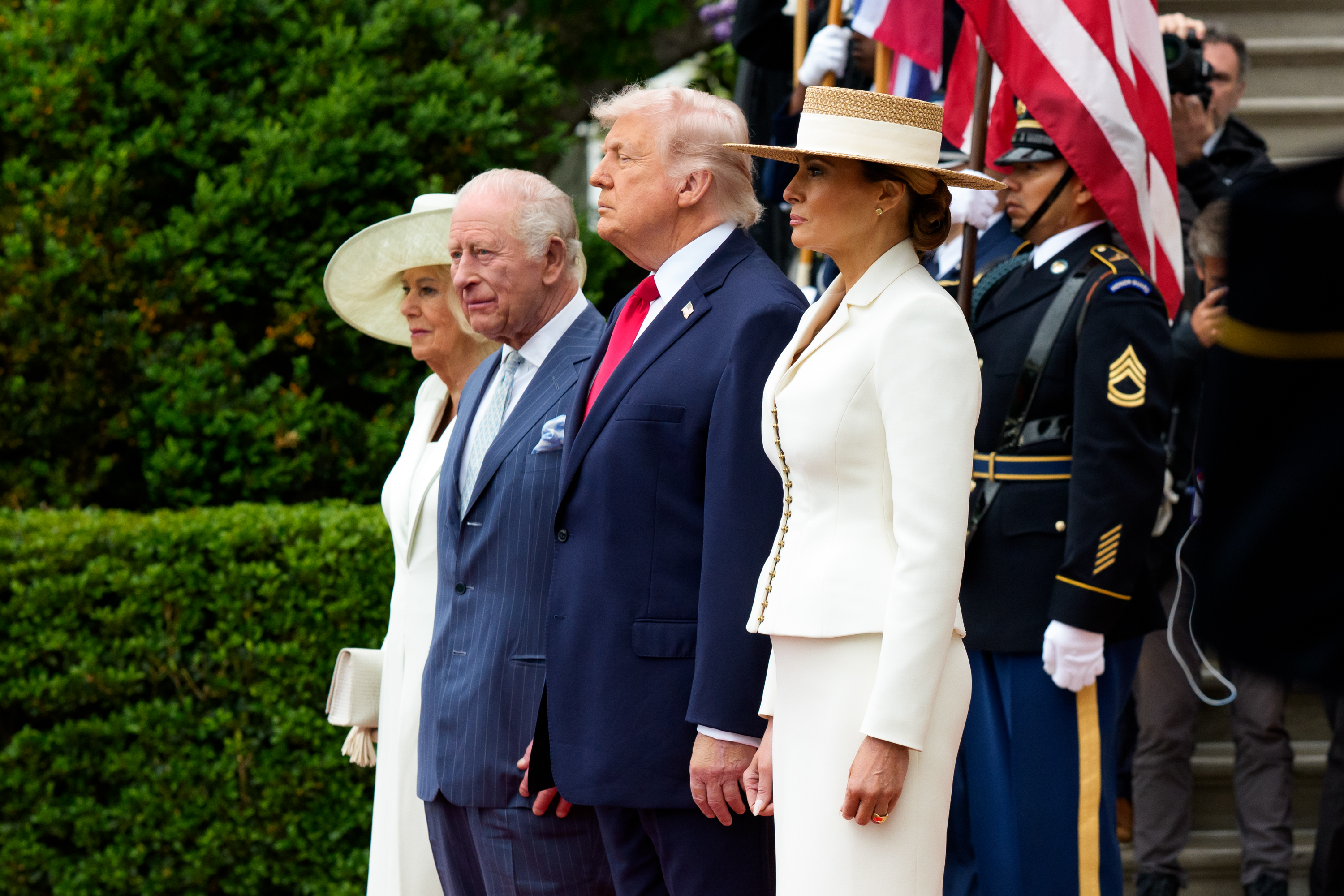
The Trumps hosted a State Arrival Ceremony on the South Lawn of the White House for the King and Queen

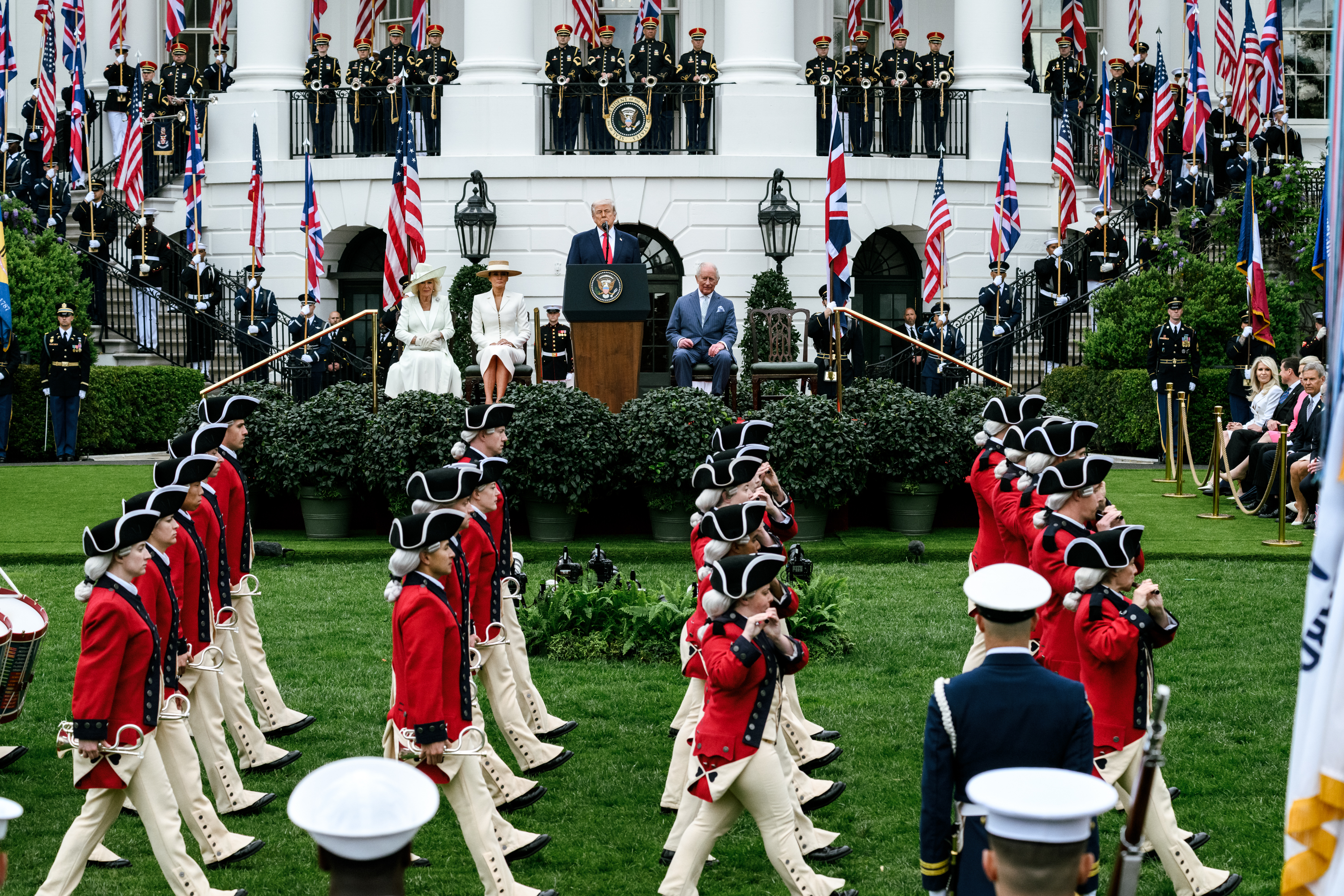
The pass in review held as part of the State Arrival Ceremony

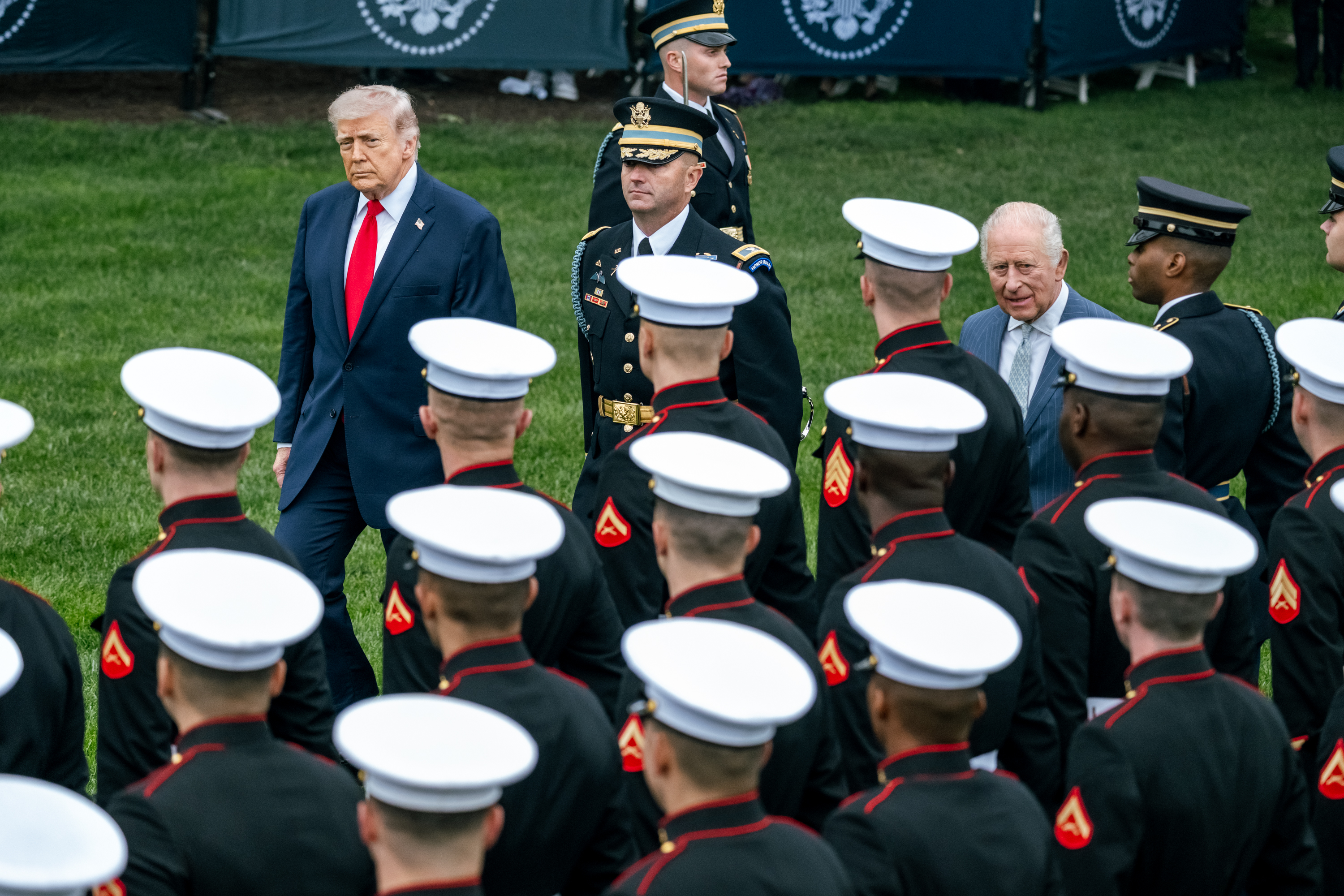
The King and the President inspecting troops

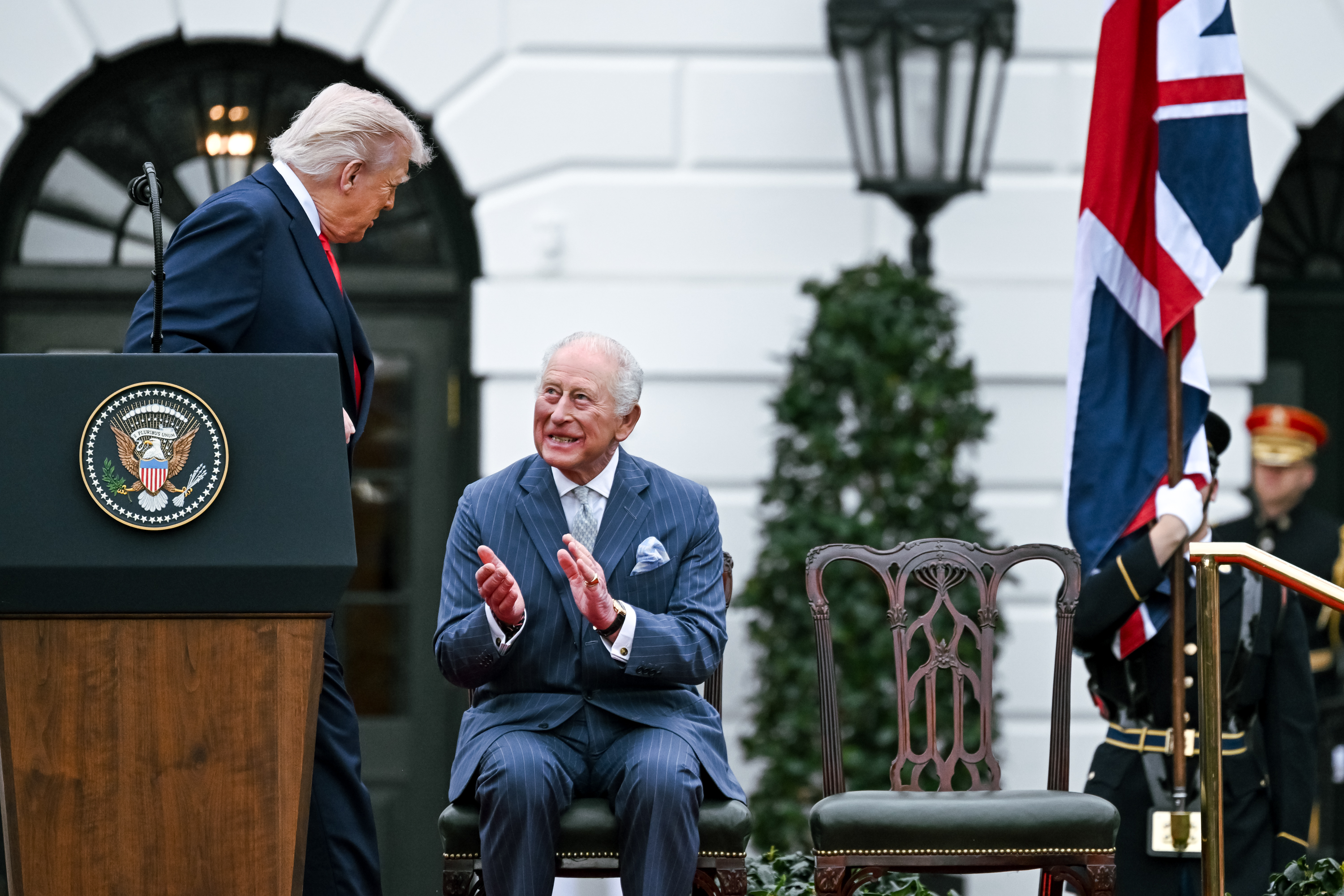
The President making remarks during the State Arrival Ceremony

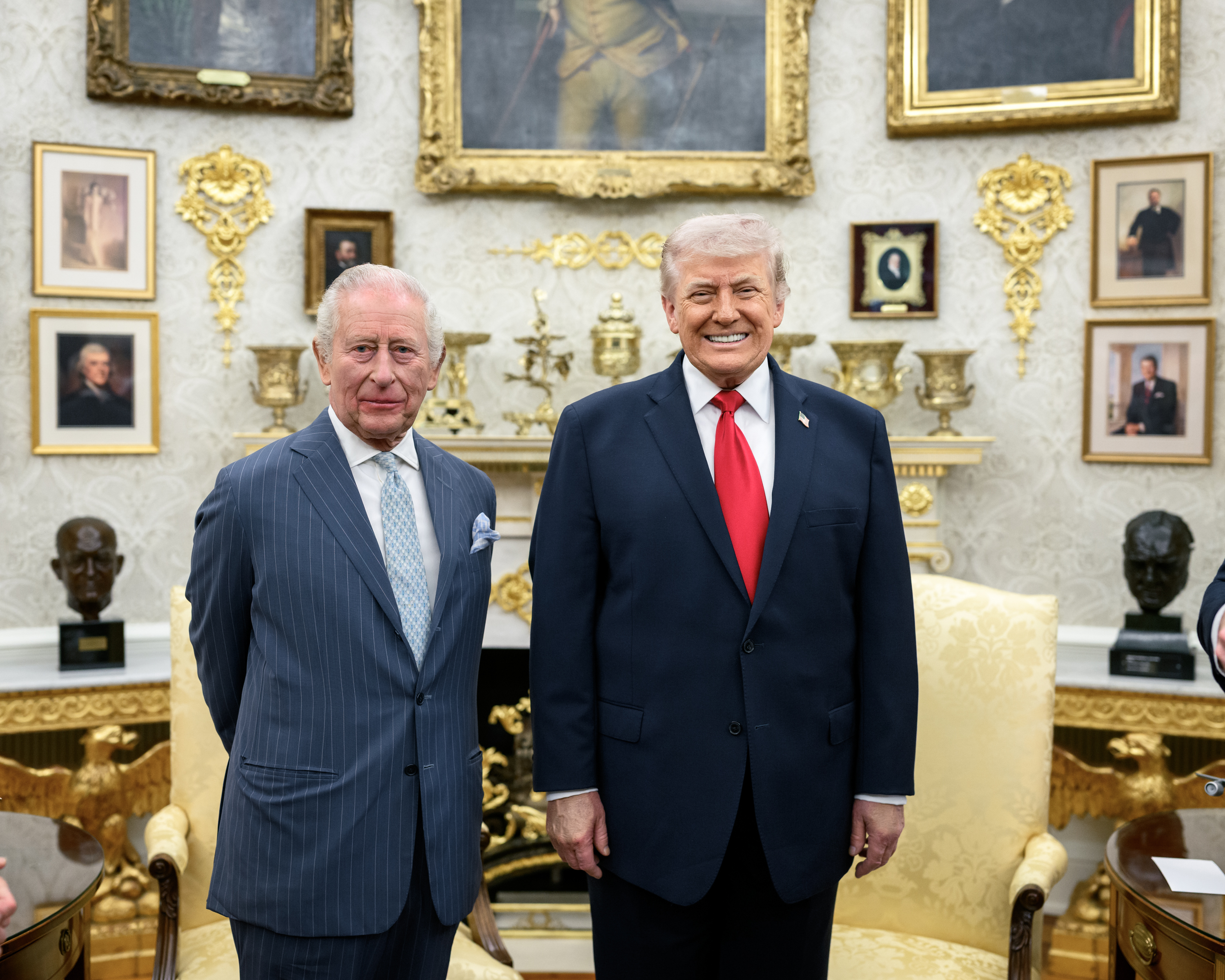
The President and the King holding bilateral talks in the Oval Office

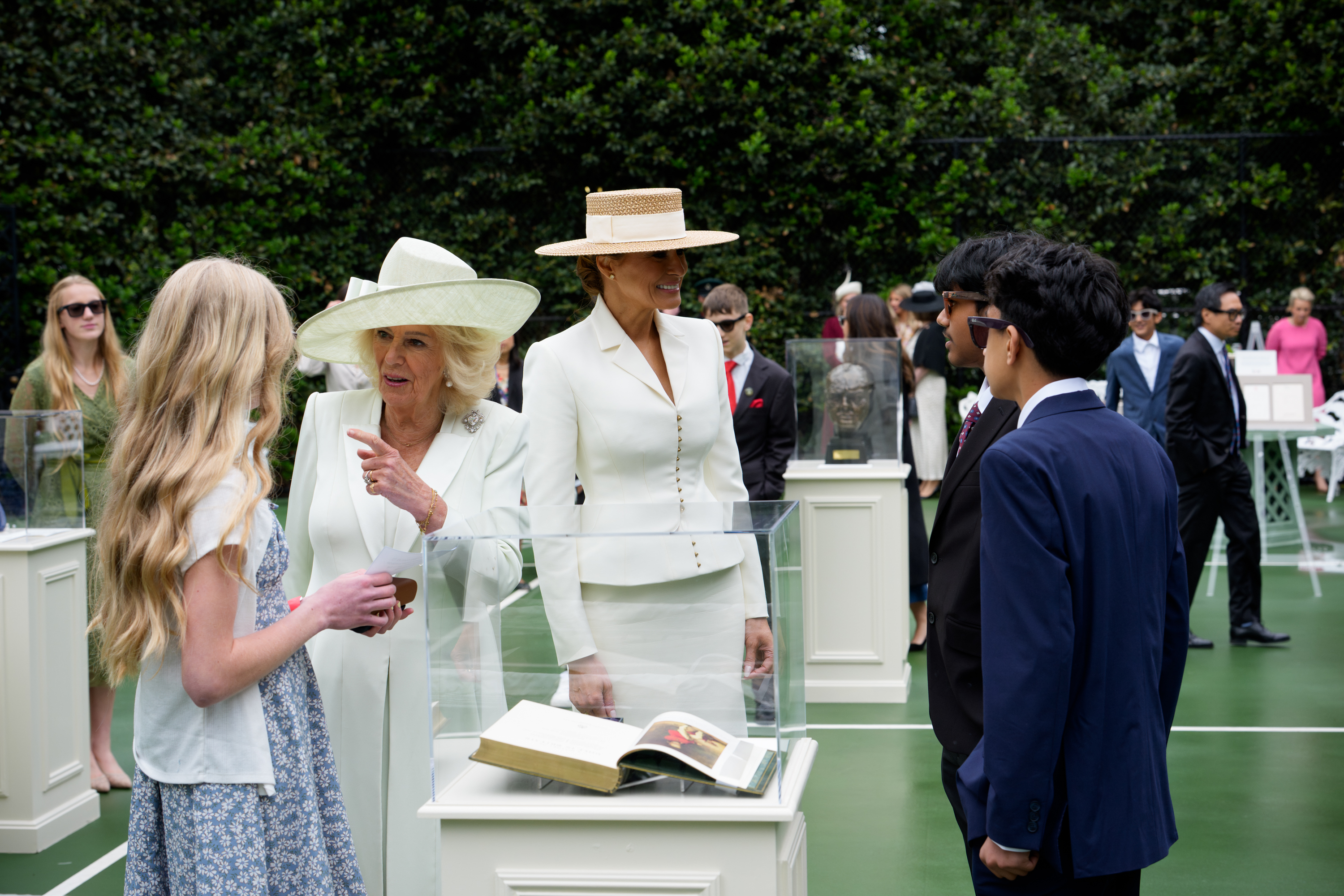
The First Lady and The Queen visiting the White House Tennis Pavilion for a youth educational event focusing on US–UK history and technology

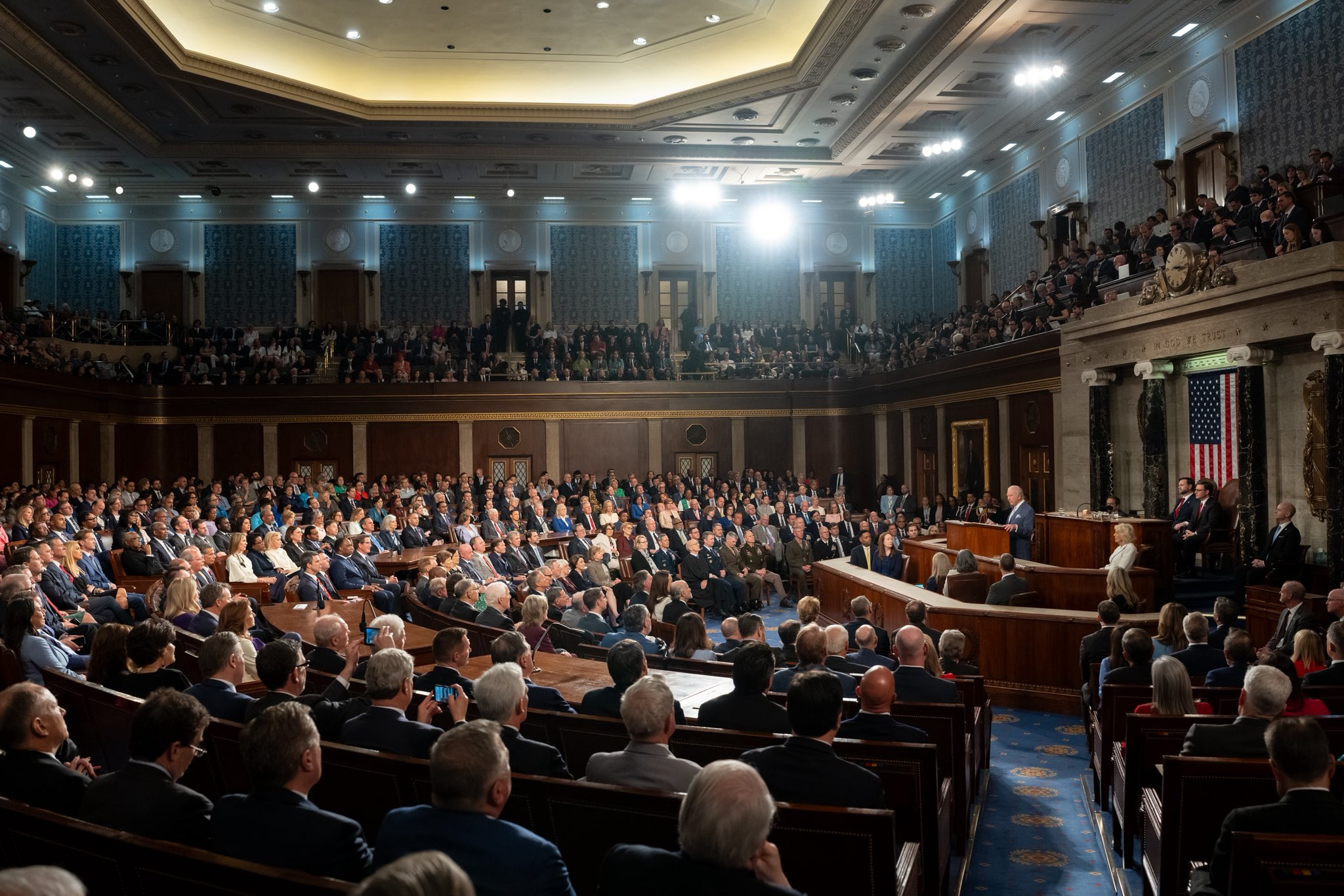
The King addressing a joint meeting of the United States Congress

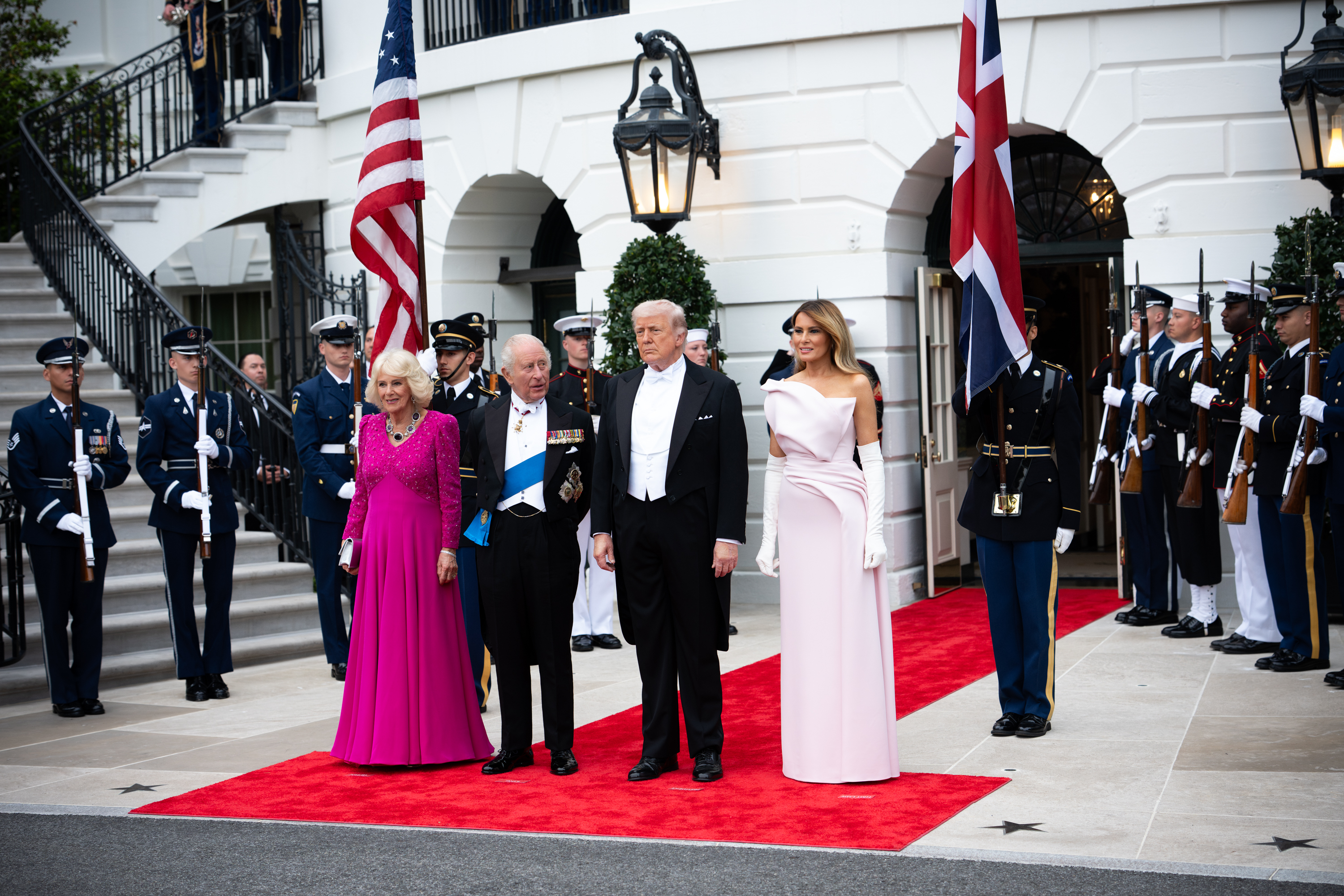
The King and Queen arriving for the state banquet

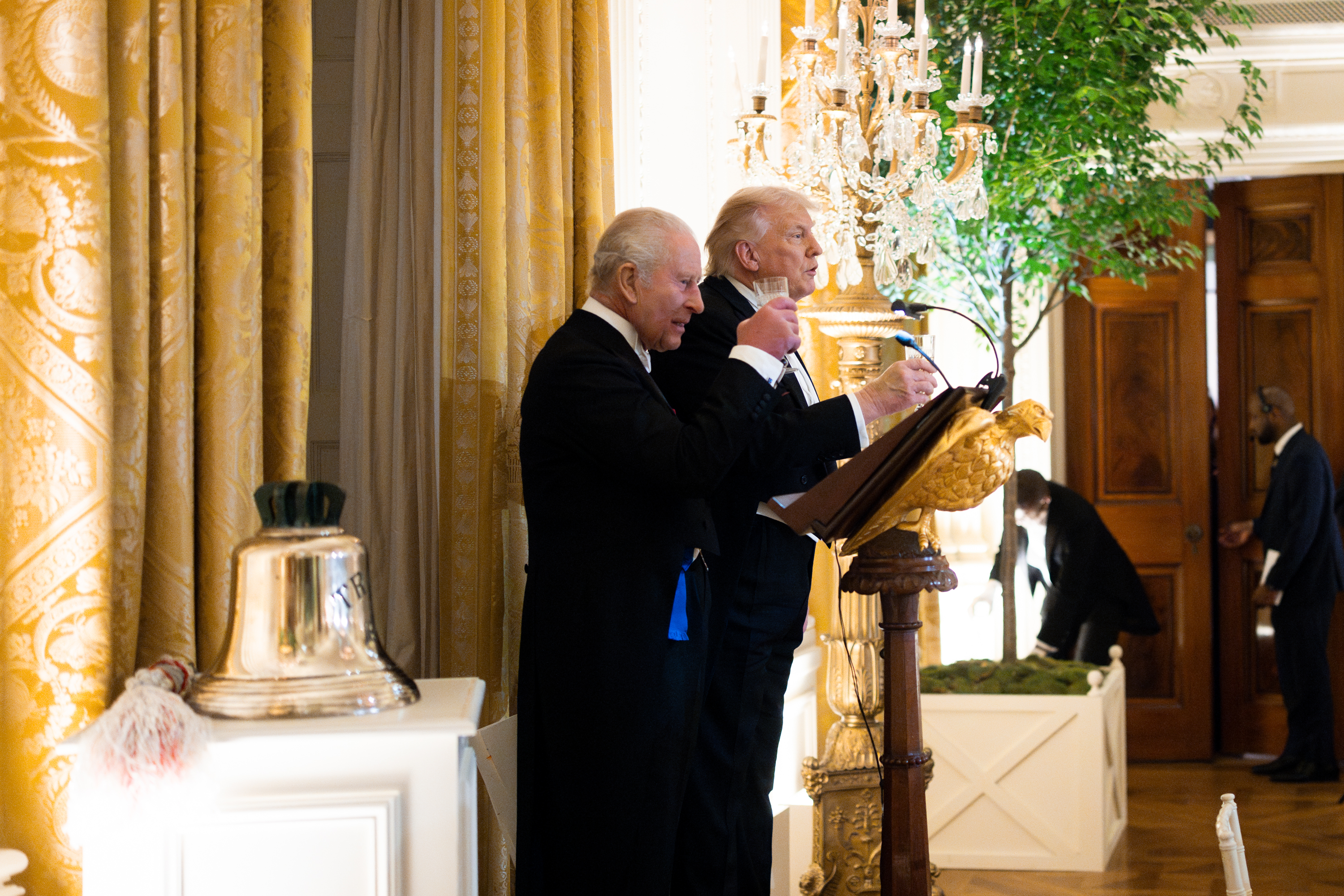
The King proposing a toast after his speech at the state banquet

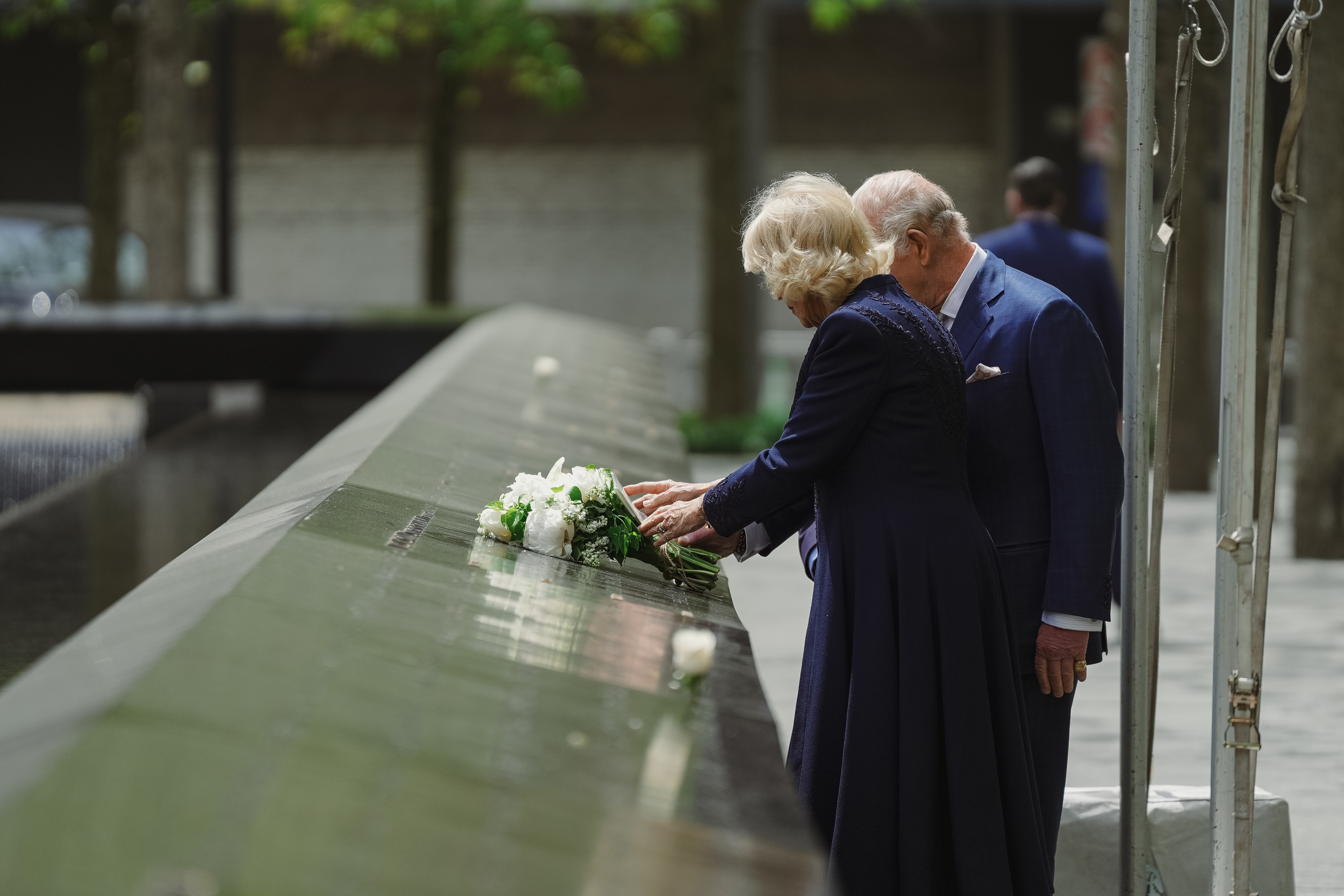
The King and Queen laying flowers at the September 11 Memorial in New York City

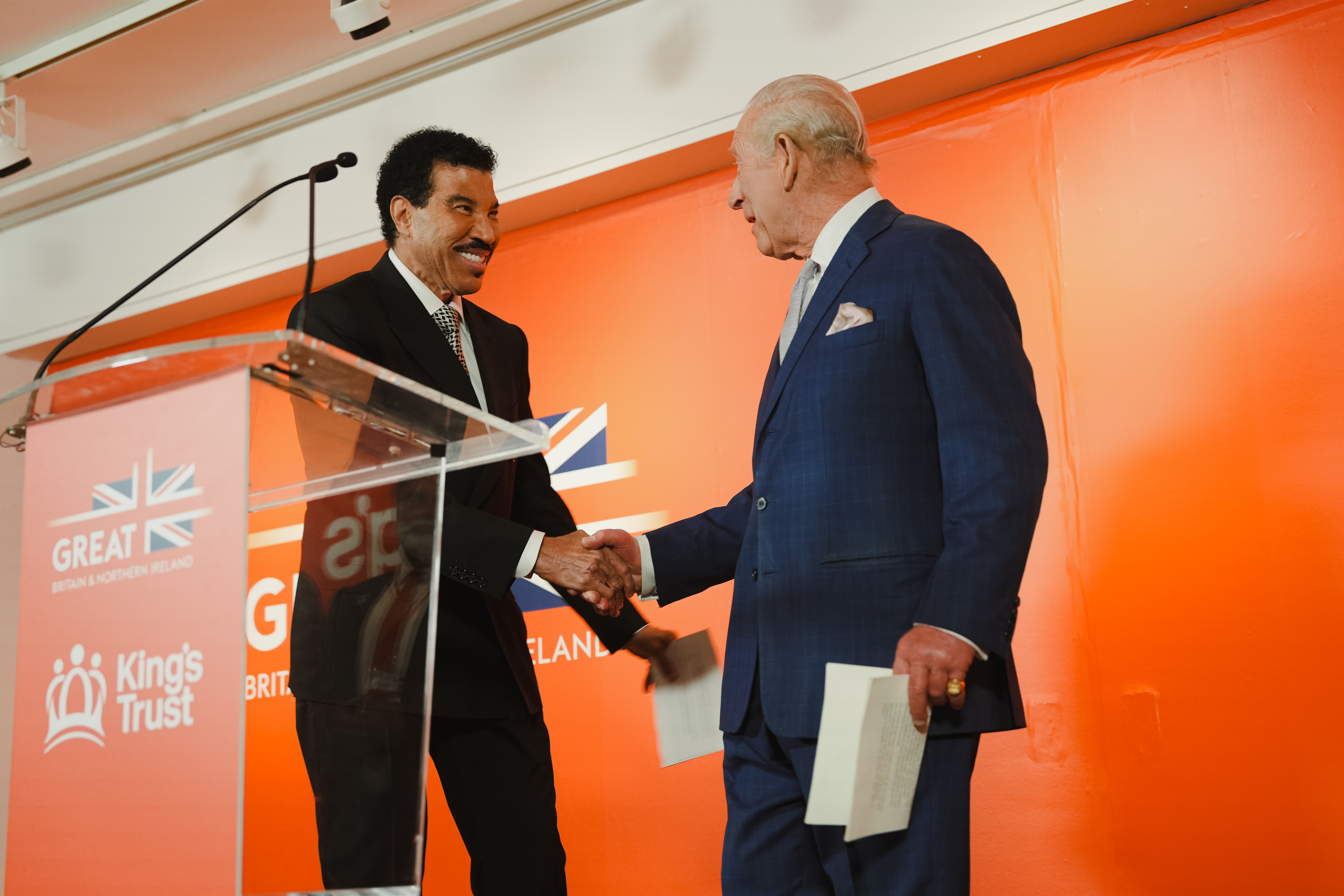
The King with Lionel Richie at a reception for the King's Trust

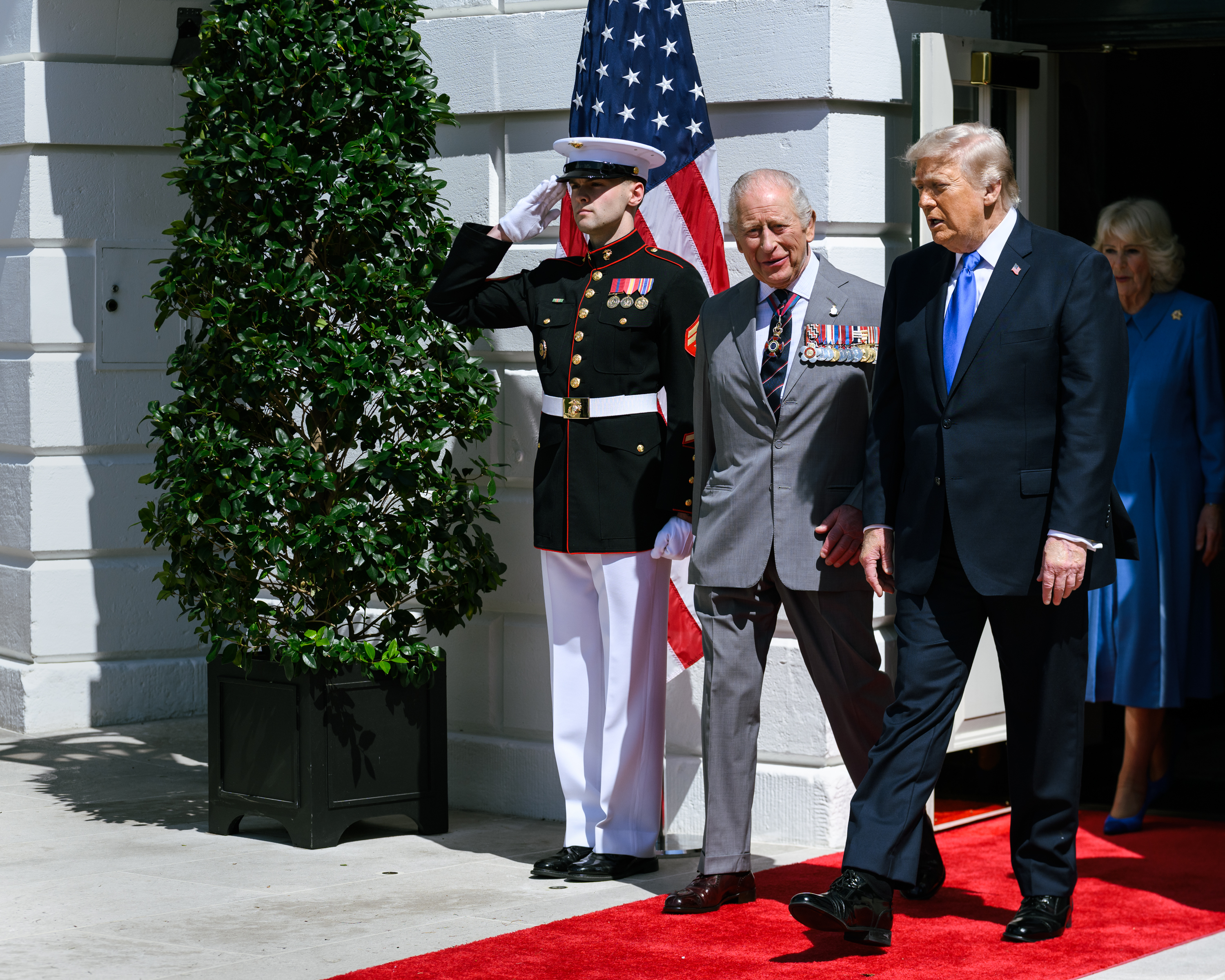
The King leaving the White House after making his official farewell to President Trump

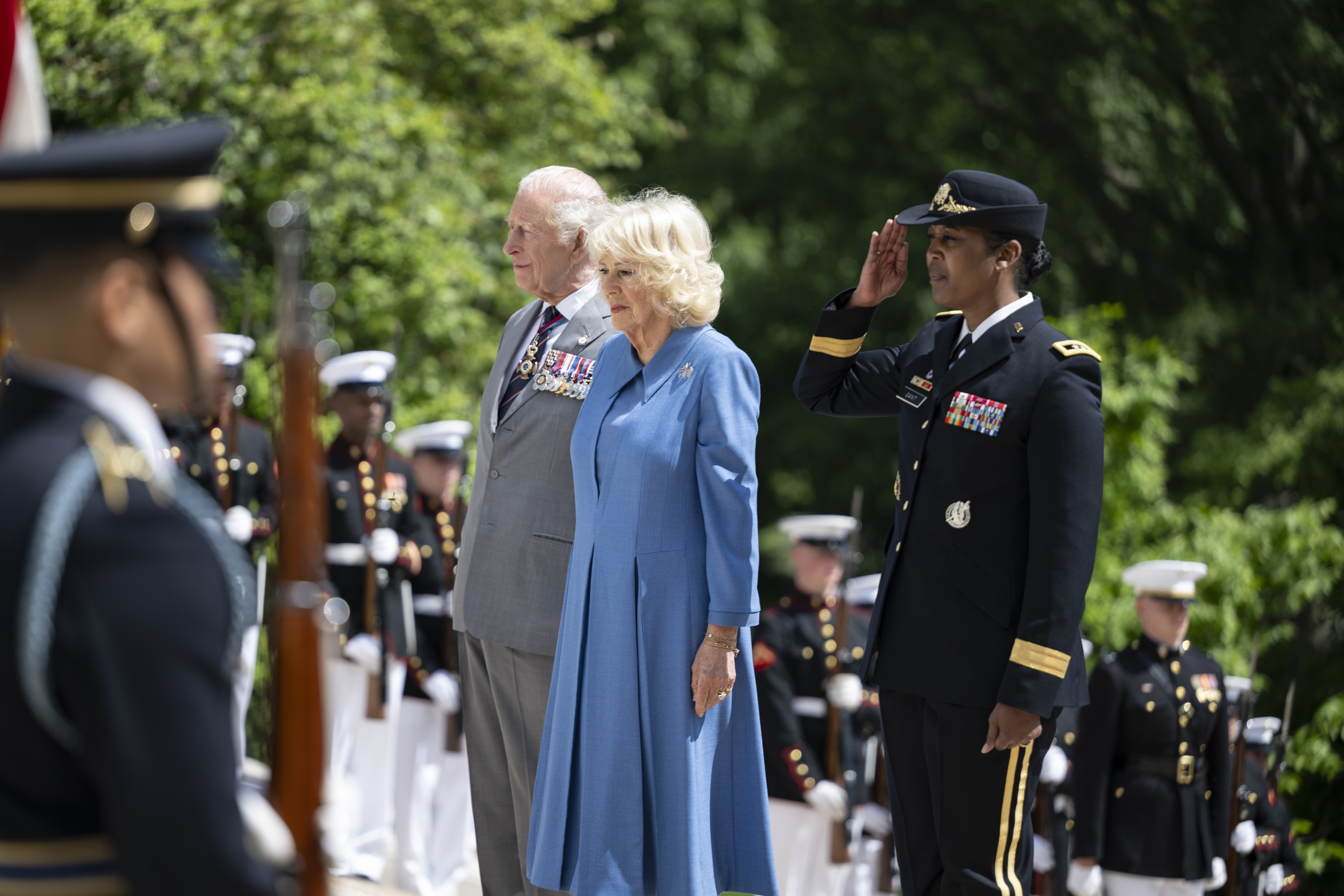
The King and Queen visiting the Arlington National Cemetery to participate in a wreath-laying ceremony at the Tomb of the Unknown Soldier

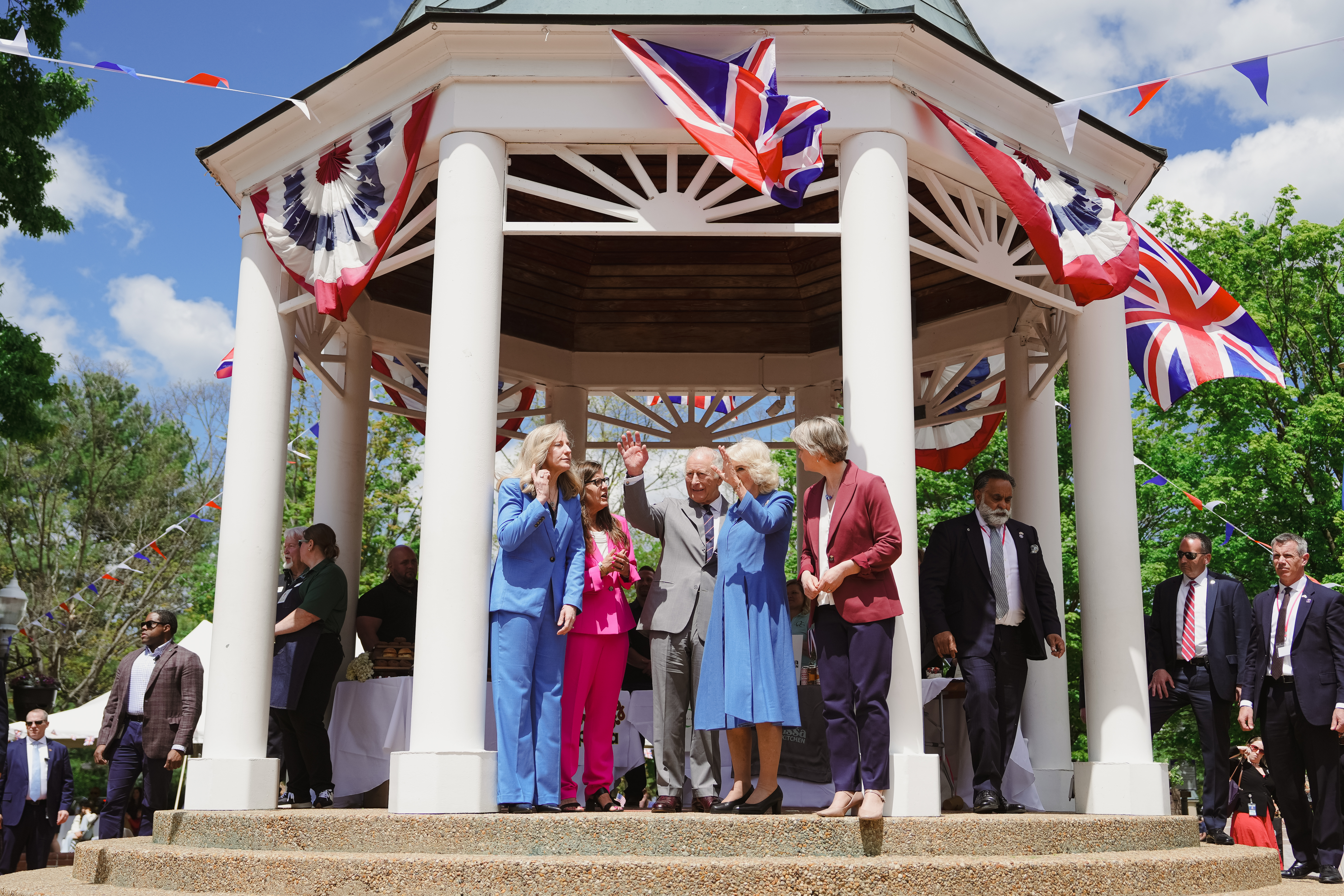
The King and Queen greeting crowds in Front Royal, Virginia

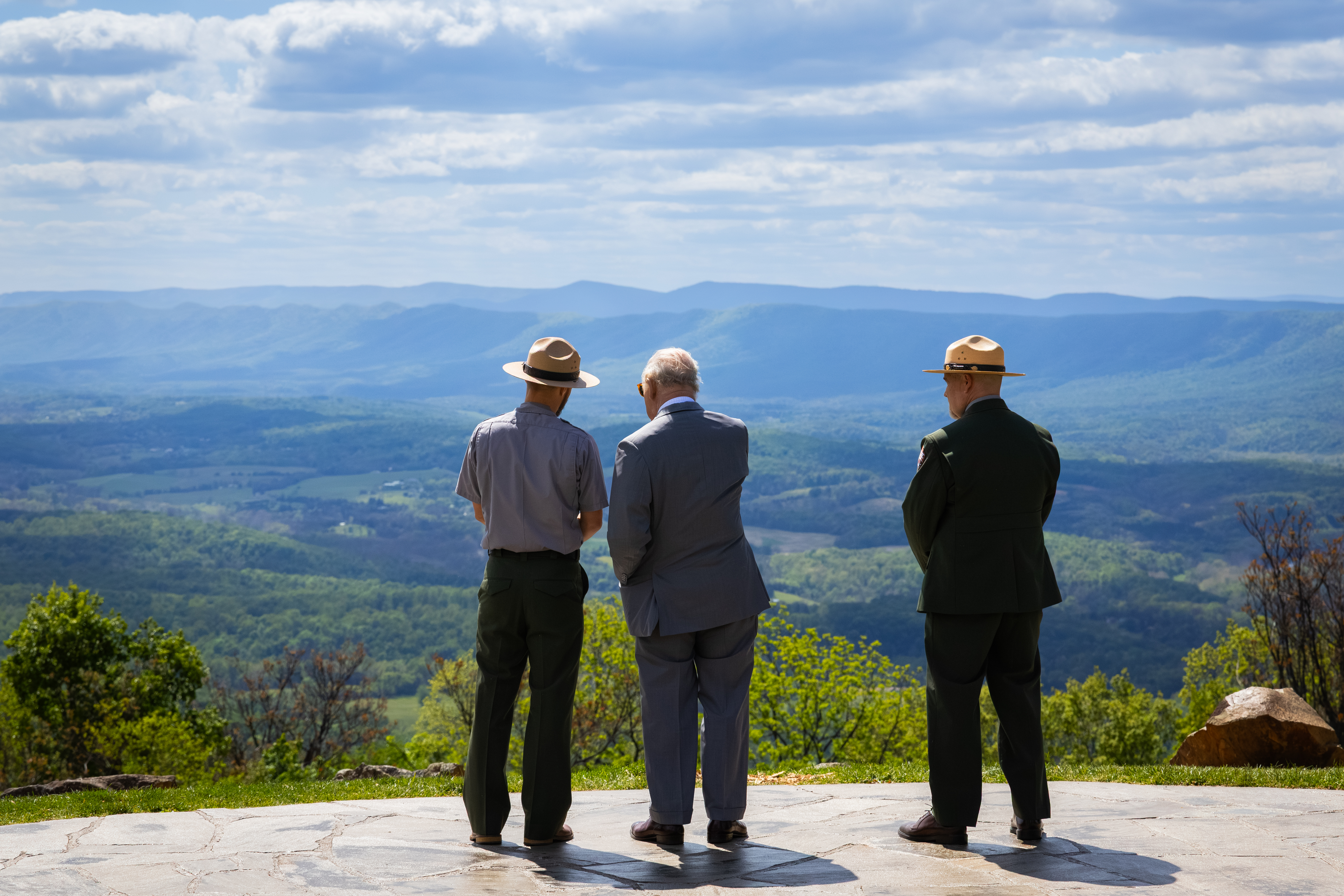
The King visiting Shenandoah National Park

== See also ==
- List of official overseas trips made by Charles III
