= House of Ruth =

American non-profit organization

House of Ruth is a non-profit organization based in Washington, DC, that provides housing and supportive services to women, children, and families experiencing trauma related to domestic violence, homelessness, mental health disorders, substance abuse, and poverty. Founded in 1976, the organization serves more than 1,000 individuals and families each year.

== Programs ==
House of Ruth provides trauma-informed and comprehensive support services for women, children, and families in the Washington, D.C. area. Its continuum of care includes

- 12 service-enriched housing programs,
- Kidspace Child and Family Development Center,
- and counseling services available to individuals in Washington, D.C., Maryland, and Virginia who have experienced domestic violence.
