= 1991 state visit by Elizabeth II to the United States =

State visit by Elizabeth II to the United States
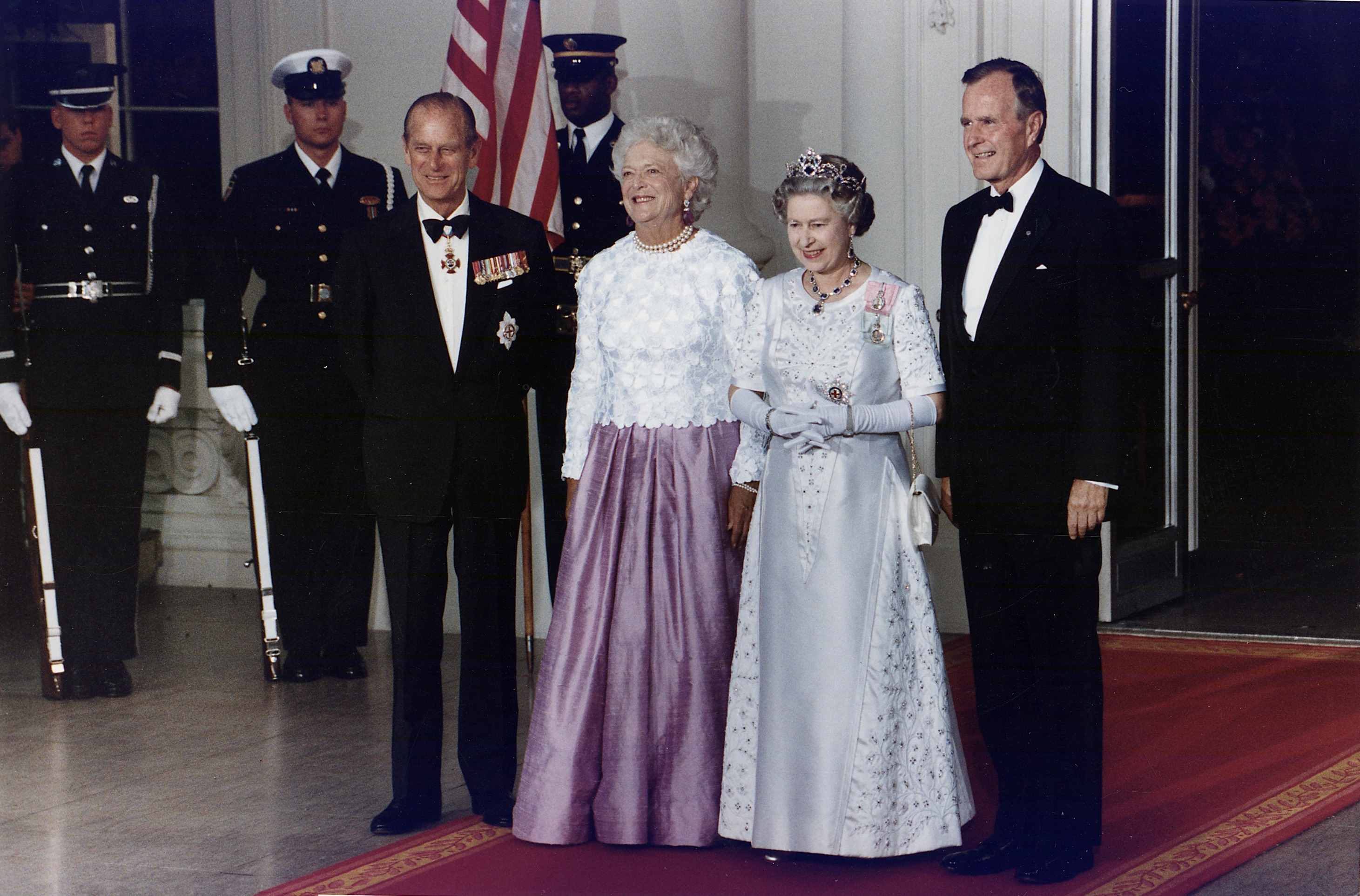
- Date: 14 to 26 May 1991
- Location: Washington, D.C., Arlington, Baltimore, Tampa, Miami, Austin, San Antonio, Dallas, Houston
- Type: State visit
- Participants: Queen Elizabeth II; Prince Philip, Duke of Edinburgh

From 14 to 26 May 1991, Queen Elizabeth II, made a state visit to the United States with her husband, Prince Philip, Duke of Edinburgh. She was received by President George H. W. Bush on 14 May 1991. The visit marked the third time she undertook a state visit to the United States as monarch, being her fourth official visit overall.

== Schedule ==
Queen Elizabeth II and Prince Philip, Duke of Edinburgh were formally welcomed on the South Lawn of the White House by President George H. W. Bush and First Lady Barbara Bush. The UK and U.S. national anthems were played during the military ceremony, accompanied by the firing of gun salutes to mark the occasion. The Queen also inspected the Guard of Honor. During the visit, she planted a little-leaf linden on the South Lawn. The Queen then visited the Arlington National Cemetery and laid a wreath the Tomb of the Unknown Soldier. A state dinner was served in the royals' honor on the night of 14 May. On 15 May, the Queen toured northeast Washington, D.C. and attended a lunch at a celebration of British film and television. On the same day, she attended a garden party on the grounds of the British embassy. The President and the First Lady then took the Queen and the Duke to a game of Baltimore Orioles. On 16 May, the Queen watched King Lear acted at the Folger Shakespeare Theater and The Taming of the Shrew at the Fillmore School. The Queen addressed a joint session of Congress on 16 May 1991, becoming the first British monarch to do so. Subsequently, she set off for visits to Miami and Tampa in Florida, Austin, San Antonio, and Houston in Texas, and Lexington in Kentucky.

The Queen's visit to Florida began on 17 May when she arrived at the Miami International Airport. Her engagements included a visit to Booker T. Washington Middle School, a brief garden party at Vizcaya Museum and Gardens, and a dinner and black tie reception aboard the HMY Britannia attended by former presidents Ronald Reagan and Gerald Ford. A small protest by the Irish American Unity Conference took place during the event. The Queen and the Duke also visited Fort Jefferson. The Queen and Duke visited the MacDill Air Force Base. In a private ceremony, the Queen made General Norman Schwarzkopf Jr. an honorary Knight Commander in the Military Division of Most Honourable Order of the Bath.

The visit to Texas began on 20 May, marking the first time that a British monarch had ever set foot in the state. Governor Ann Richards and former first lady Lady Bird Johnson toasted the monarch at a formal reception and dinner that was hosted at the Lyndon B. Johnson Library and Museum. The Queen also addressed the Texas State Legislature. On 21 May, the royal entourage landed at Kelly Air Force Base for a visit to San Antonio where they saw the San Antonio River, met with local dignitaries at the Institute of Texan Cultures, and visited the Alamo Mission. They then departed for Dallas Love Field; upon arriving in Dallas, the Queen stayed at the Adolphus Hotel before visiting the Morton H. Meyerson Symphony Center and the Hall of State at Fair Park to honor the 150th anniversary of the establishment of Dallas. On 22 May, the Queen and Duke toured the Johnson Space Center in Houston and visited a VA Medical Center, the Museum of Fine Arts, and the Antioch Missionary Baptist Church.

The Duke of Edinburgh returned to England following the conclusion of their visit to Texas. For the final leg of the tour, the Queen visited Kentucky horse farms to make breeding arrangements for her mares.

== Gallery ==
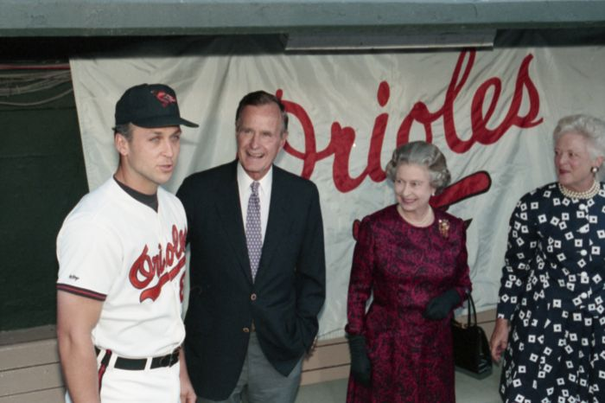
The Queen, President Bush and First Lady Barbara Bush with Cal Ripken Jr. in the Orioles dugout

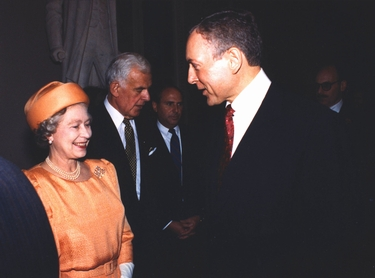
The Queen with Senator Orrin Hatch during her visit to the U.S. Congress

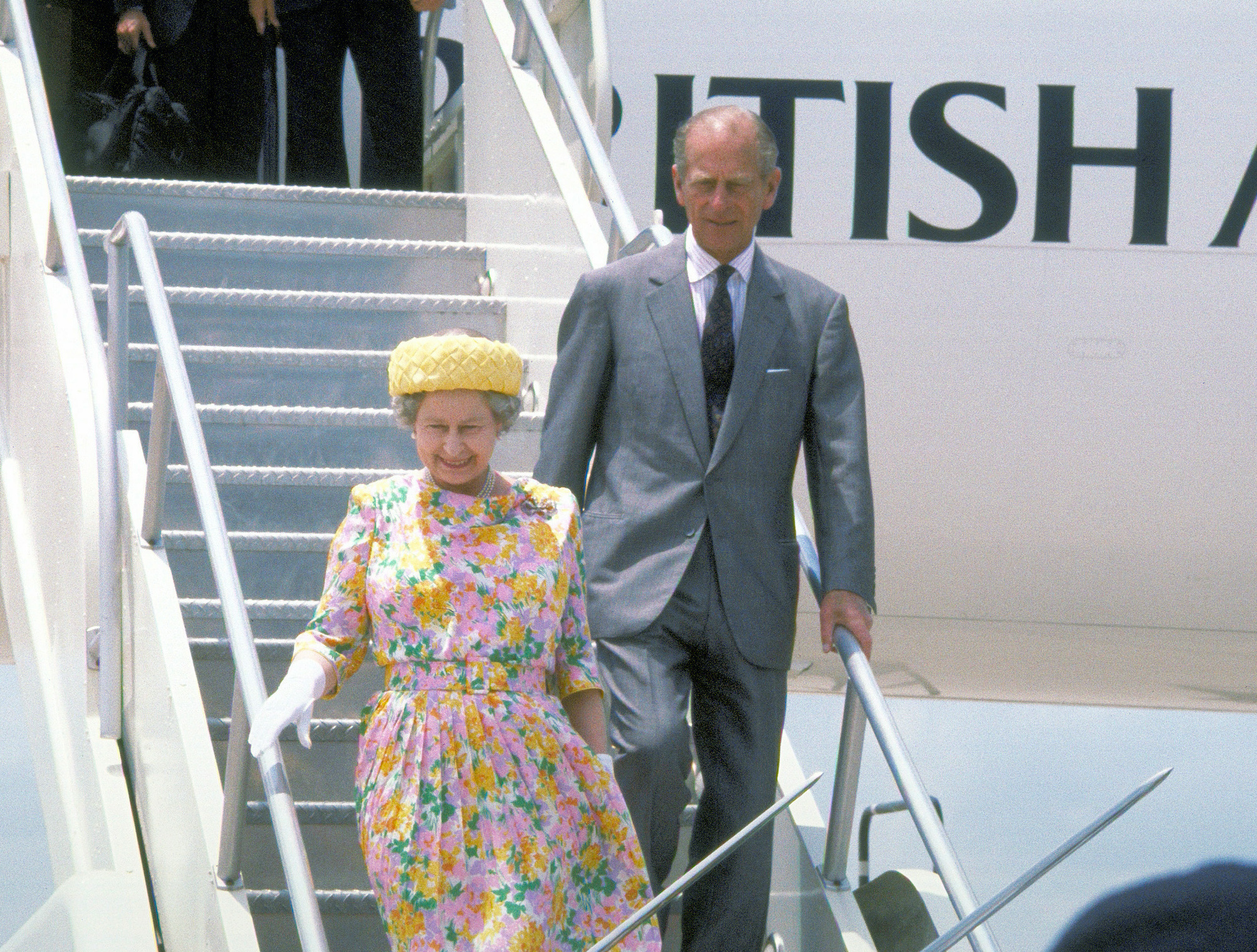
The Queen and the Duke of Edinburgh arriving at Bergstrom Air Force Base for their tour of Austin, Texas
