= Italian Americans =

American citizens of Italian descent

Italo-americani (Italian)
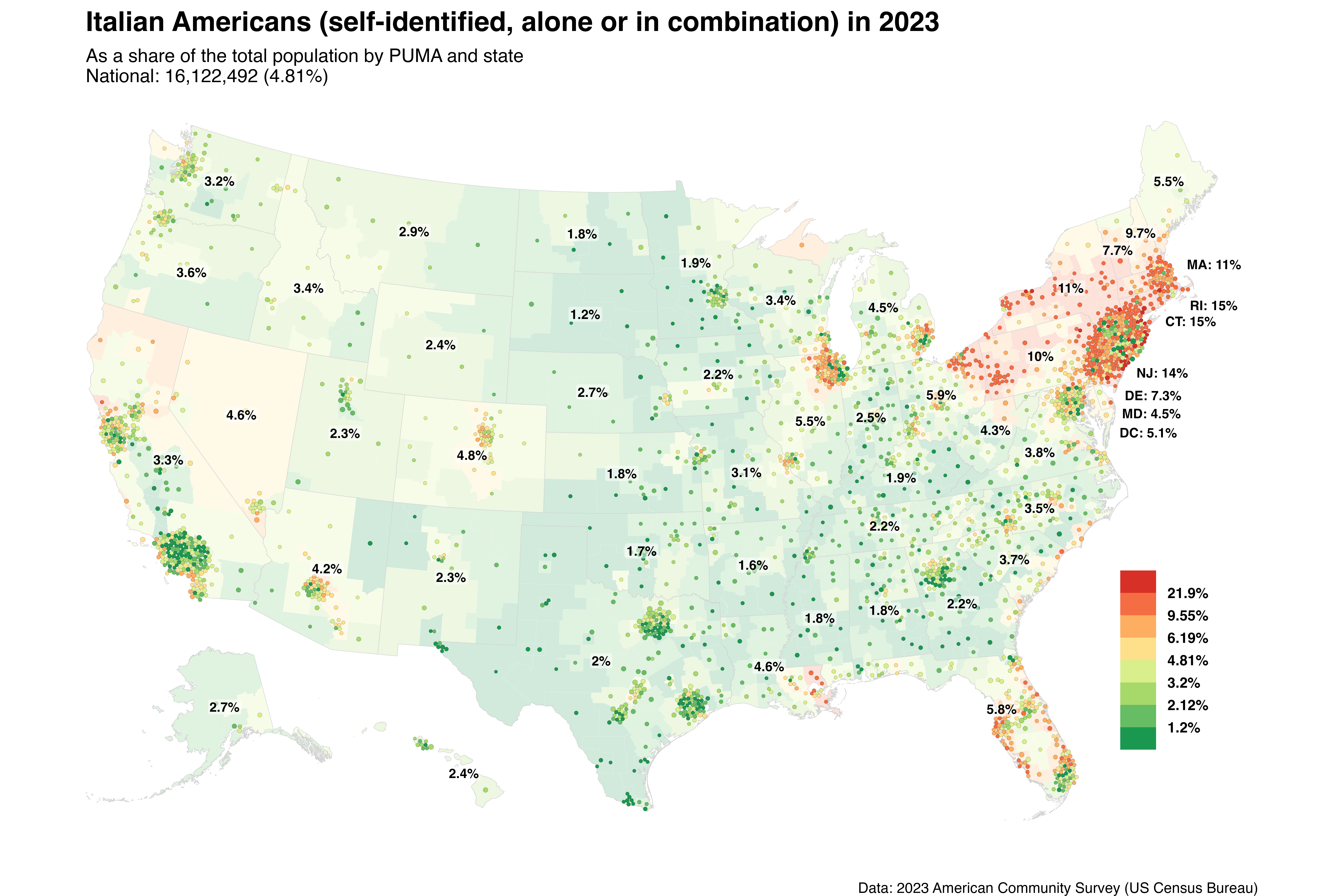
- Italian American ancestry by PUMA and state according to the U.S. Census Bureau's American Community Survey in 2023

Total population
- Alone (one ancestry); 6,629,993 (2020 census); 2.00% of the total US population Alone or in combination 16,813,235 (2020 census); 5.07% of the total US population

Languages
- English; Italian; Various languages of Italy; Italian American pidgin (including Itanglese and Siculish)

Religion
- Predominantly Catholicism with small minorities practicing Greek Orthodoxy, Protestantism and Judaism

Related ethnic groups
- Corsican Puerto Ricans (also Corsican Americans), Maltese Americans, Sammarinese Americans and other Italians

Italian Americans (Italian: italoamericani [ˌitaloameriˈkaːni]) are Americans who have full or partial Italian ancestry. The largest concentrations of Italian Americans are in the urban Northeast and industrial Midwestern metropolitan areas, with significant communities also residing in many other major U.S. metropolitan areas.

Between 1820 and 2004, approximately 5.5 million Italians migrated to the United States during the Italian diaspora, in several distinct waves, with the greatest number arriving in the 20th century from Southern Italy. Initially, most single men, so-called birds of passage, sent remittance back to their families in Italy and then returned to Italy.

Immigration began to increase during the 1880s, when more than twice as many Italians immigrated than had in the five previous decades combined. From 1880 to the outbreak of World War I in 1914, the greatest surge of immigration brought more than 4 million Italians to the United States. The largest number of this wave came from Southern Italy, which at that time was largely agricultural and where much of the populace had been impoverished by centuries of foreign rule and disproportionately affected by taxes implemented by the recently unified Kingdom of Italy. In the 1920s, 455,315 more immigrants arrived. Many of them came under the terms of the new quota-based immigration restrictions created by the Immigration Act of 1924.

Italian-Americans have had a significant influence on American culture, making numerous contributions to visual arts, literature, cuisine, politics, sports, science, scholarship, and music.

== History ==
=== Before 1880 ===
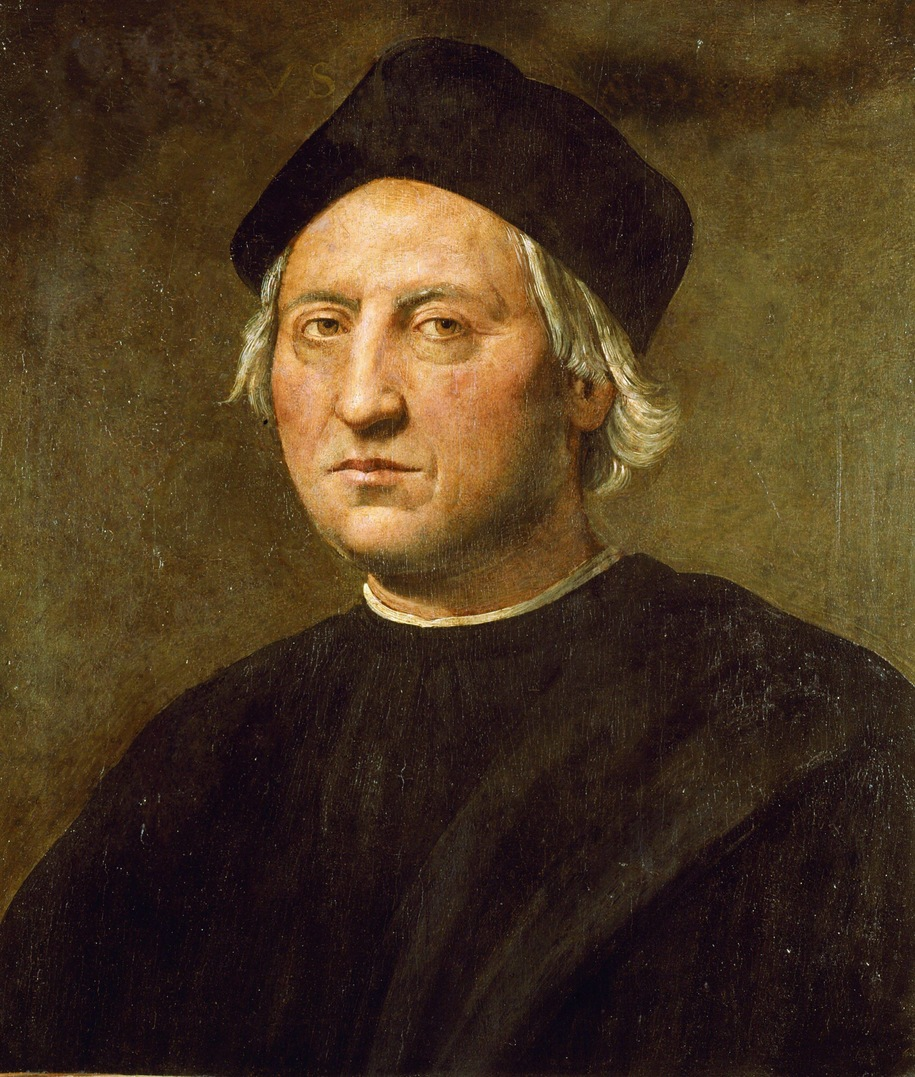
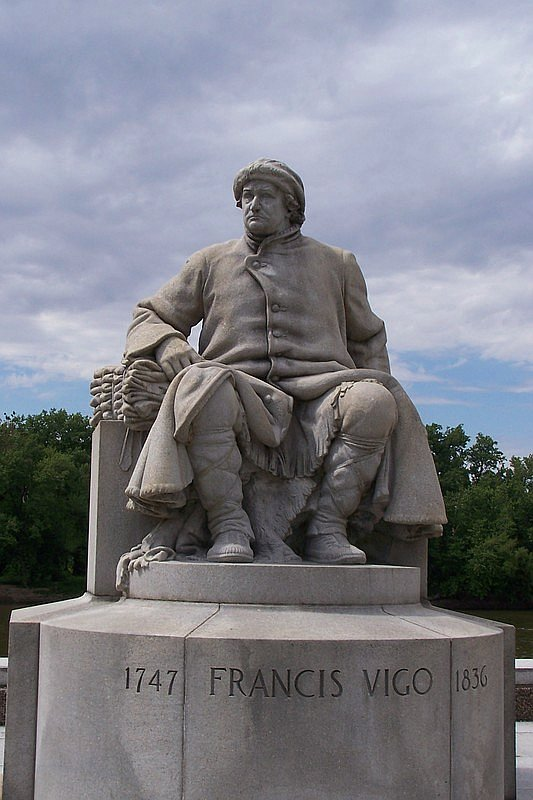
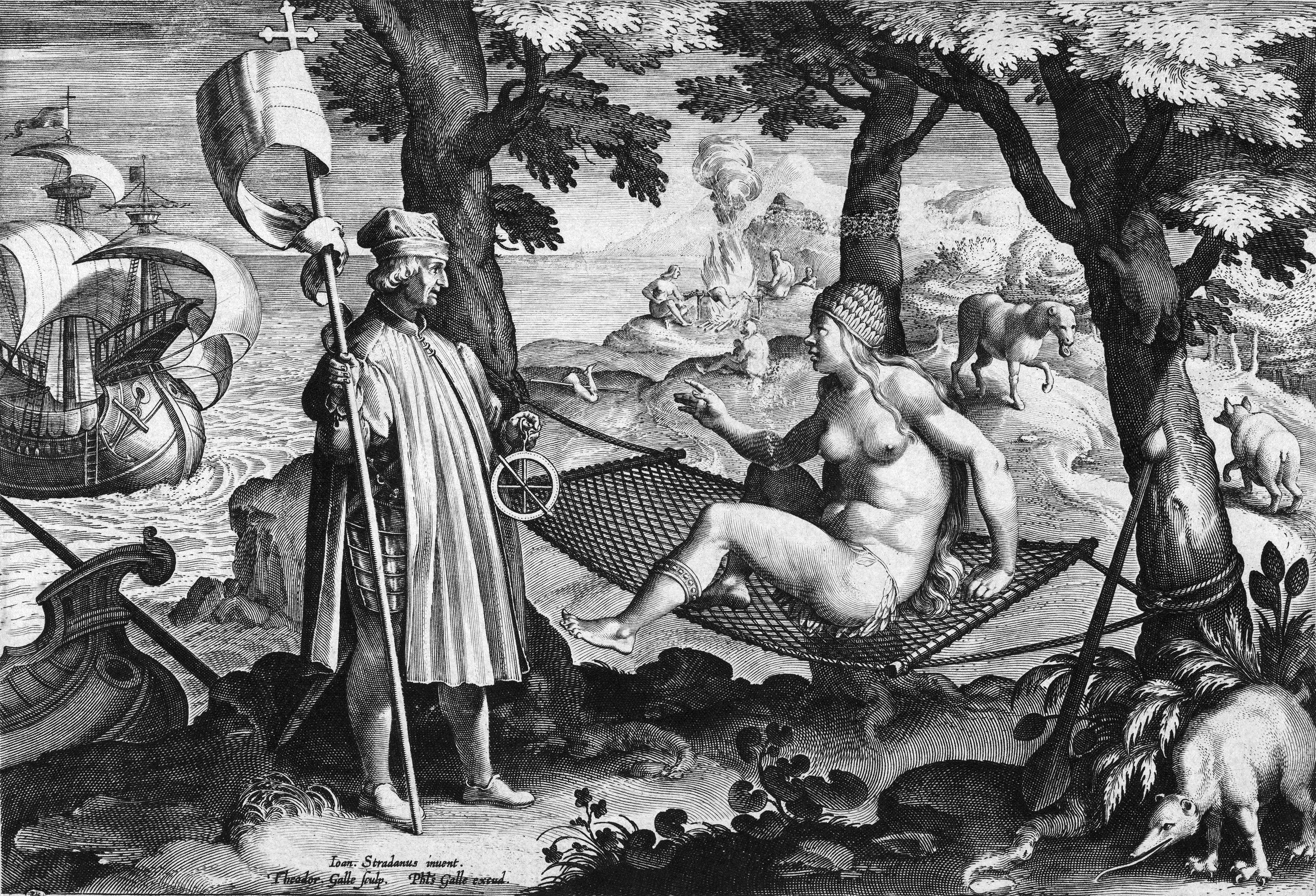
Clockwise from top:
- Christopher Columbus
- Francesco Vigo
- Amerigo Vespucci

Italian navigators and explorers played a key role in the exploration and settlement of the Americas by Europeans. Genoese explorer Christopher Columbus completed four voyages across the Atlantic Ocean for the Catholic monarchs of Spain, opening the way for the widespread European exploration and colonization of the Americas. John Cabot and his son Sebastian explored the eastern seaboard of North America for Henry VII in the early 16th century. In 1524, the Florentine explorer Giovanni da Verrazzano was the first European to explore the Atlantic coast of North America between Florida and New Brunswick. The Italian explorer Amerigo Vespucci first demonstrated c. 1501 that the New World was not Asia, as initially conjectured, but a different continent (America is named after him).

The first Italian to be registered as residing in the area corresponding to the current United States was Pietro Cesare Alberti, a Venetian seaman who, in 1635, settled in the Dutch colony of New Amsterdam. A small wave of Protestants, known as Waldensians, immigrated during the 17th century, with the majority coming between 1654 and 1663. They spread out across what was then called New Netherland and what would become New York, New Jersey, and the Lower Delaware River regions.

Enrico Tonti, together with the French explorer René-Robert Cavelier, Sieur de La Salle, explored the Great Lakes region. De Tonti founded the first European settlement in Illinois in 1679 and in Arkansas in 1683, making him "The Father of Arkansas." With LaSalle, he co-founded New Orleans and was governor of the Louisiana Territory for the next 20 years. His brother Alphonse de Tonty (Alfonso de Tonti), with French explorer Antoine de la Mothe Cadillac, was the co-founder of Detroit in 1701, and was its acting colonial governor for 12 years. The southwest and California were explored and mapped by Italian Jesuit priest Eusebio Kino in the late 17th and early 18th centuries.

The Taliaferro family, believed to have roots in Venice, was one of the First Families to settle Virginia; Richard Taliaferro designed much of Colonial Williamsburg. The period from 1776 to 1880 saw a small stream of new arrivals from Italy. Some brought skills in agriculture and the making of glass, silk and wine, while others brought skills as musicians. After American independence, numerous political refugees arrived, most notably Giuseppe Avezzana, Alessandro Gavazzi, Silvio Pellico, Federico Confalonieri, and Eleuterio Felice Foresti. Giuseppe Garibaldi resided in the United States in 1850–51.

In 1773–1785, Filippo Mazzei, a close friend of Thomas Jefferson, published a pamphlet containing the phrase, "All men are by nature equally free and independent," which Jefferson incorporated essentially intact into the Declaration of Independence. Italian Americans served in the American Revolutionary War both as soldiers and officers. Francesco Vigo aided the colonial forces of George Rogers Clark by serving as one of the foremost financiers of the Revolution in the frontier Northwest.

In 1789–91, Alessandro Malaspina mapped much of the west coast of the Americas. In 1822–23, the headwater region of the Mississippi was explored by Giacomo Beltrami in the territory that was later to become Minnesota. Missionaries of the Jesuit and Franciscan orders were active in many parts of America. Italian Jesuits founded numerous missions, schools, and two colleges in the west. Giovanni Nobili founded the Santa Clara College (now Santa Clara University) in 1851. The St. Ignatius Academy (now University of San Francisco) was established by Anthony Maraschi in 1855. The Italian Jesuits also laid the foundation for the winemaking industry that would later flourish in California. In the east, the Italian Franciscans founded hospitals, orphanages, schools, and St. Bonaventure College (now St. Bonaventure University), established by Pamfilo da Magliano in 1858. Las Vegas College (now Regis University) was established by a group of exiled Italian Jesuits in 1877 in Las Vegas, New Mexico. The Jesuit Giuseppe Cataldo, founded Gonzaga College (now Gonzaga University) in Spokane, Washington in 1887.

In 1801, Philip Trajetta established the nation's first conservatory of music in Boston. In 1805, Thomas Jefferson recruited a group of musicians from Sicily to form a military band, later to become the nucleus of the U.S. Marine Band. In 1833, Lorenzo Da Ponte, formerly Mozart's librettist and a naturalized U.S. citizen, founded the first opera house in the United States, the Italian Opera House in New York City, which was the predecessor of the New York Academy of Music and of the New York Metropolitan Opera.

Samuel Wilds Trotti of South Carolina was the first Italian American to serve in the U.S. Congress (a partial term, from December 17, 1842, to March 3, 1843). In 1849, Francesco de Casale began publishing the Italian American newspaper L'Eco d'Italia in New York, the first of many to eventually follow.

Beginning in 1863, Italian immigrants were one of the principal groups of unskilled laborers, along with the Irish, that built the Transcontinental Railroad west from Omaha, Nebraska. The first Columbus Day celebration was organized by Italian Americans in New York City on October 12, 1866.

=== Civil War ===
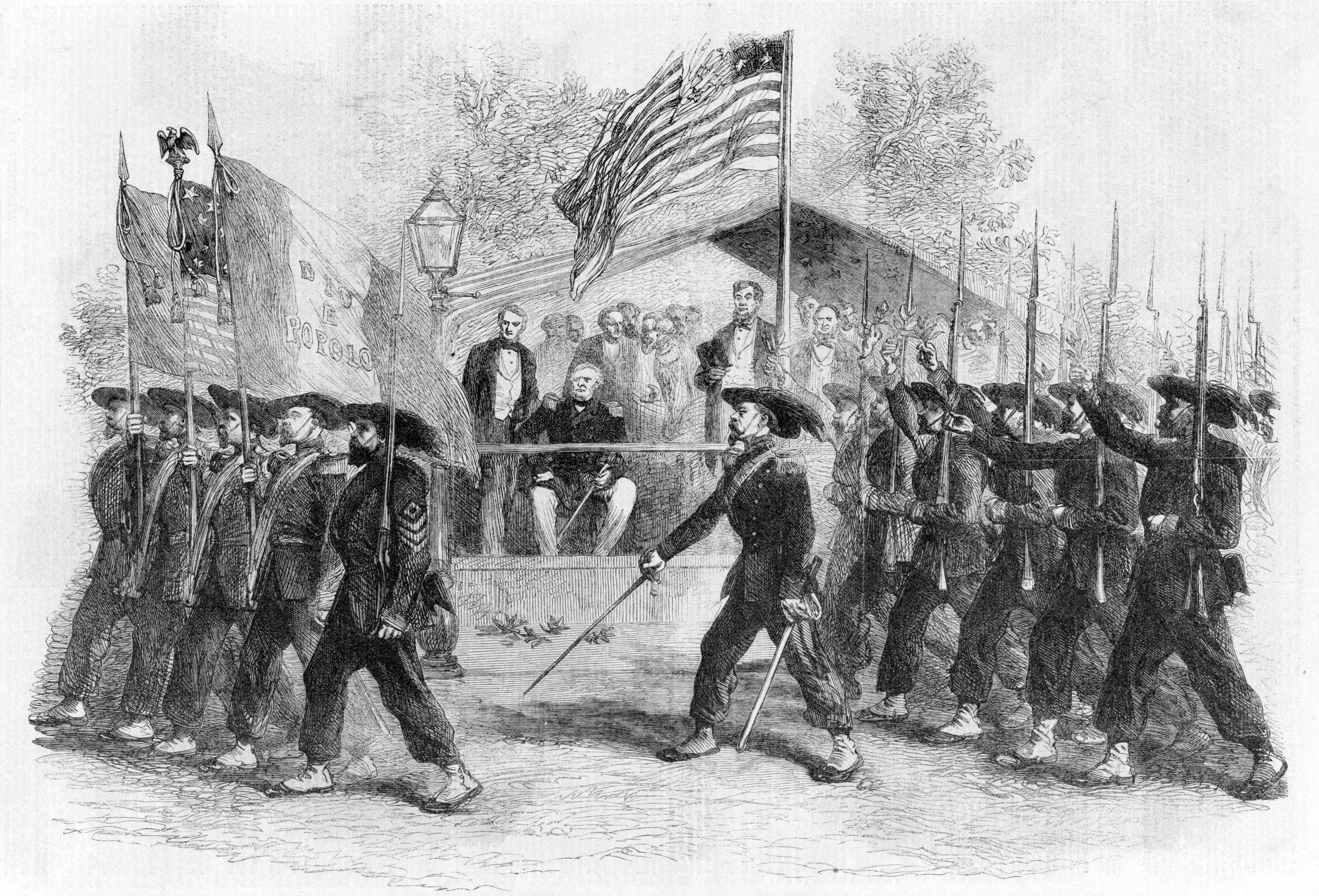
Review of the Garibaldi Guard by President Lincoln

Between 5,000 and 10,000 Italian Americans fought in the American Civil War. The great majority of Italian Americans, for both demographic and ideological reasons, were in the Union Army, including Francis B. Spinola, the first Italian American to be elected to the United States House of Representatives, who served as a general. Some Americans of Italian descent fought in the Confederate Army. They included Confederate generals William B. Taliaferro and P. G. T. Beauregard. Six Italian Americans received the Medal of Honor during the war, including Colonel Luigi Palma di Cesnola, who later became the first director of the Metropolitan Museum of Arts in New York (1879–1904).

The Garibaldi Guard recruited volunteers for the Union Army from Italy and other European countries to form the 39th New York Infantry. The 39th New York Volunteer Infantry Regiment, with 350 Italian members, was nicknamed Garibaldi Guard in honor of Giuseppe Garibaldi. In 1861, Garibaldi himself volunteered his services to President Abraham Lincoln. Garibaldi was offered a major general's commission in the U.S. Army through the letter from Secretary of State William H. Seward to H. S. Sanford, the U.S. minister at Brussels.

=== Period of Italian mass immigration (1880–1914) ===
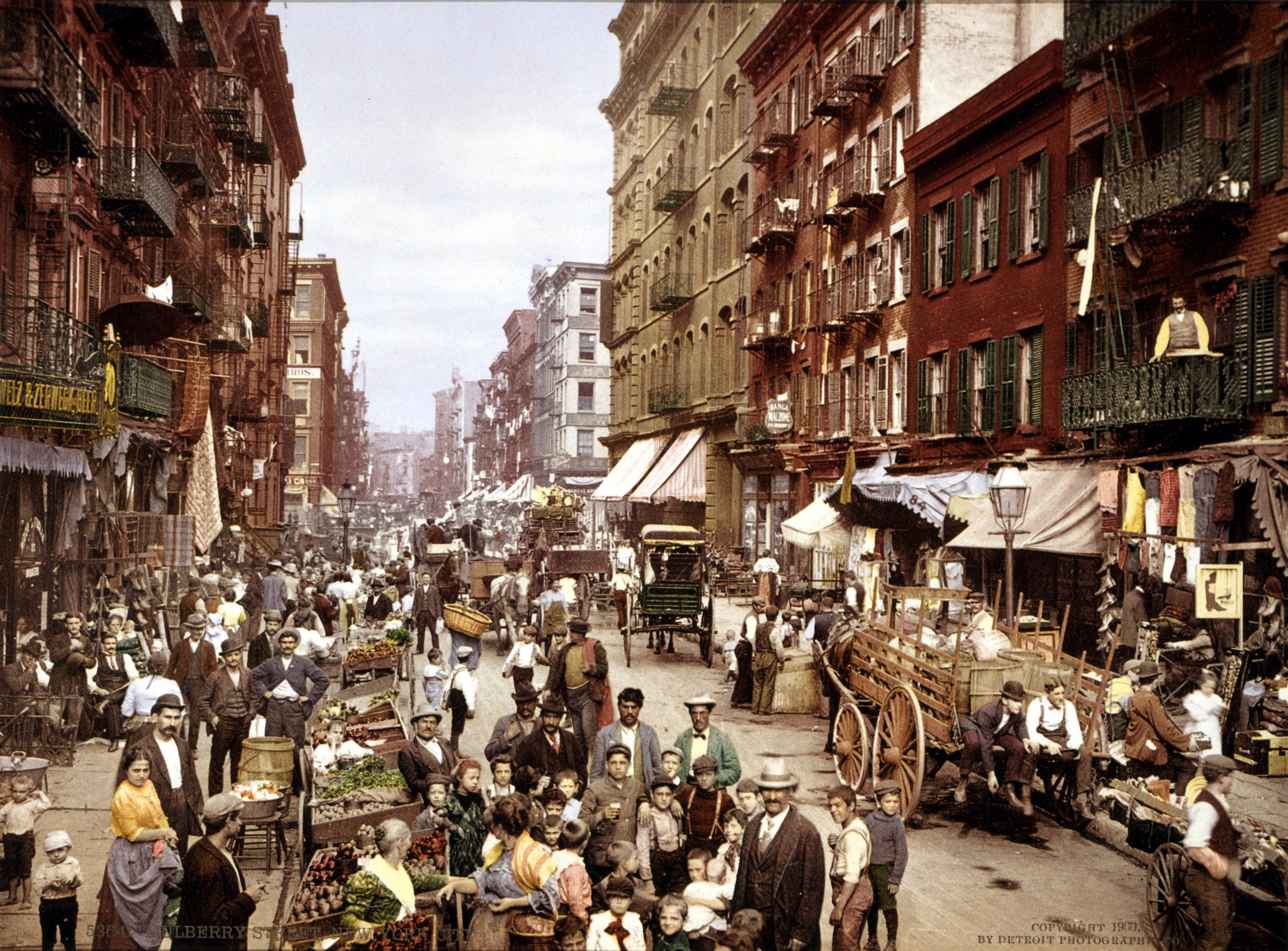
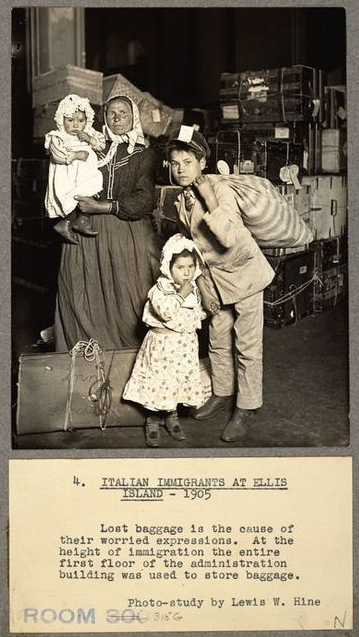
Clockwise from top:
- Mulberry Street, along which New York City's Little Italy is centered. Lower East Side, c. 1900
- Little Italy in Chicago, 1909
- Italian immigrants entering the United States via Ellis Island in 1905

From 1880 to 1914, 13 million Italians migrated out of Italy. During this period of mass migration, 4 million Italians arrived in the United States, 3 million of them between 1900 and 1914. They came for the most part from southern Italy and from the island of Sicily. This period of large-scale immigration ended abruptly with the onset of WWI in August 1914. Most immigrants planned to stay a few years, then take their earnings and return home. According to historian Thomas J. Archdeacon, 46 percent of the Italians who entered the United States between 1899 and 1924 permanently returned home.

Immigrants without industrial skills found employment in low-wage manual labor jobs. Instead of finding jobs on their own, most used the padrone system whereby Italian middlemen (padroni) found jobs for groups of men and controlled their wages, transportation, and living conditions for a fee.

In terms of the push-pull model of immigration, the push factor came primarily from the harsh economic conditions in southern Italy. Major factors that contributed to the large exodus included political and social unrest, the weak agricultural economy of the South modeled on the outdated latifundist system dating back to the feudal period, a high tax burden, soil exhaustion and erosion, and military conscription lasting seven years. Many chose to emigrate rather than face the prospect of a deepening poverty. America provided the pull factor by the prospect of jobs that unskilled and uneducated Italian peasant farmers could do. By far the strongest "pull" factor was higher income. Immigrants expected to make considerable sums in only a few years of work, enabling them to improve their economic status when they returned home; however, the Italian immigrants earned well below average rates. The result was a sense of alienation from most of American culture and a lack of interest in learning English or otherwise assimilating. Not many women came, and those who did remained devoted to traditional Italian religious customs. When World War I broke out, European migrants could not go home. Wages shot up, and the Italians benefited greatly. Most decided to stay permanently.

The New York Times in May 1896 sent its reporters to characterize the Little Italy/Mulberry neighborhood:

They are laborers; toilers in all grades of manual work; they are artisans, they are junkmen, and here, too, dwell the rag pickers....There is a monster colony of Italians who might be termed the commercial or shop keeping community of the Latins. Here are all sorts of stores, pensions, groceries, fruit emporiums, tailors, shoemakers, wine merchants, importers, musical instrument makers....There are notaries, lawyers, doctors, apothecaries, undertakers....

Many sought housing in the older sections of the large Northeastern cities—districts that became known as "Little Italys." Such housing was frequently in overcrowded, substandard tenements, which were often dimly lit and had poor heating and ventilation; tuberculosis and other communicable diseases were a constant health threat. The Italian male immigrants in the Little Italys were most often employed in manual labor and were heavily involved in public works, such as the construction of roads, railroad tracks, sewers, subways, bridges, and the first skyscrapers in these cities. As early as 1890, it was estimated that around 90 percent of New York City's and 99 percent of Chicago's public works employees were Italians. The women most frequently worked as seamstresses in the garment industry or in their homes. Many established small businesses in the Little Italys. In spite of the economic hardship of the immigrants, civil and social life flourished in the Italian American neighborhoods of the large northeastern cities. The festa street festival became for many an important connection to the traditions of their ancestral villages in Italy, helping give the immigrants a sense of unity and common identity.

Many of the Italian immigrants also went to more remote regions of the country, such as Florida and California, drawn by opportunities in agriculture, fishing, mining, railroad construction, and lumbering. It was not uncommon, especially in the South, for the immigrants to be subjected to economic exploitation, hostility, and sometimes even violence. The Italian laborers who went to these areas were in many cases later joined by wives and children, which resulted in the establishment of permanent Italian American settlements. A number of towns, such as Roseto, Pennsylvania, Tontitown, Arkansas, and Valdese, North Carolina, were founded by Italian immigrants during this era.

Sarah Wool Moore was so concerned with grifters luring immigrants into rooming houses or employment contracts in which the bosses got kickbacks that she pressed for the founding of the Society for the Protection of Italian Immigrants (often called the Society for Italian Immigrants). The society published lists of approved living quarters and employers. Later, the organization began establishing schools in work camps to help adult immigrants learn English. Wool Moore and the society began organizing schools in the labor camps that employed Italian workers on various dam and quarry projects in Pennsylvania and New York. The schools focused on teaching phrases that workers needed in their everyday tasks.

=== Integration into American society ===
The Italian immigrants and their descendants were successful in numerous areas of endeavor including, but not limited to, those involving traditional Italian skills.

A number of major business ventures were founded by Italian Americans. Amadeo Giannini originated the concept of branch banking to serve the Italian American community in San Francisco. He founded the Bank of Italy, which later became the Bank of America. His bank financed the Golden Gate Bridge and also the first American animated film, the Walt Disney film Snow White, which established Hollywood as the capital of American film production. Other companies founded by Italian Americans—such as Ghirardelli Chocolate Company, Progresso, Planters Peanuts, Contadina, Chef Boyardee, and Jacuzzi—became nationally known brand names in time.

Italian conductors contributed to the early success of the Metropolitan Opera of New York (founded in 1880), but it was the arrival of impresario Giulio Gatti-Casazza in 1908, who brought with him conductor Arturo Toscanini, that made the Met internationally known. Many Italian operatic singers and conductors were invited to perform for American audiences, most notably, tenor Enrico Caruso. The premiere of the opera La Fanciulla del West on December 10, 1910, with conductor Toscanini and tenor Caruso, was a major international success as well as an historic event for the entire Italian American community.

Italian Americans became involved in entertainment and sports. Rudolph Valentino was one of the first great film icons. Dixieland jazz music had a number of important Italian American innovators, the most famous being Nick LaRocca of New Orleans, whose quintet made the first jazz recording in 1917. Italian Americans became increasingly involved in politics, government, and the labor movement. Andrew H. Longino was elected governor of Mississippi in 1900. Charles Bonaparte was secretary of the Navy and later attorney general in the Theodore Roosevelt administration, and he founded the Federal Bureau of Investigation.

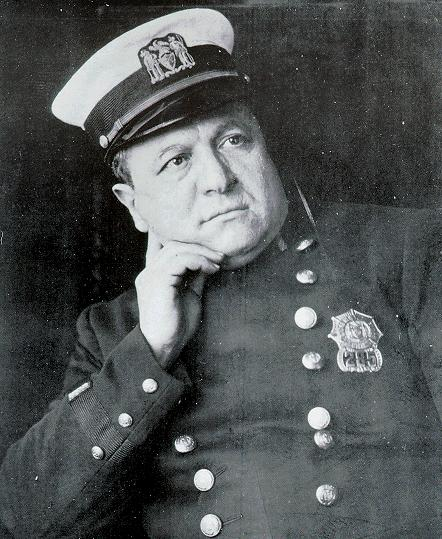
Joe Petrosino in 1909

Joe Petrosino was a New York City Police Department (NYPD) officer who was a pioneer in the fight against organized crime. Crime-fighting techniques that Petrosino pioneered are still practiced by law enforcement agencies. Salvatore A. Cotillo was the first Italian American to serve in both houses of the New York State Legislature and the first who served as Justice of the New York State Supreme Court. Fiorello La Guardia was elected to Congress from New York in 1916. He served as mayor of New York City from 1934 to 1946 as a Republican.

Numerous Italian Americans were at the forefront in fighting for worker's rights in industries such as the mining, textiles, and garment industries, the most notable among these being Arturo Giovannitti, Carlo Tresca, and Joseph Ettor.

=== World War I and interwar period ===
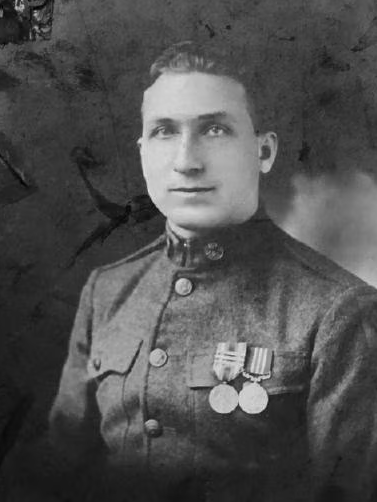
Michael Valente, recipient of the highest military decoration, the Medal of Honor, for his actions during World War I

The United States entered World War I in 1917. The Italian American community wholeheartedly supported the war effort and its young men, both American born and Italian born, enlisted in large numbers in the American Army. It was estimated that during the two years of the war (1917–18) Italian American servicemen made up approximately 12 percent of the total American forces, a disproportionately high percentage of the total. An Italian-born American infantryman, Michael Valente, was awarded the Medal of Honor for his service. Another 103 Italian Americans (83 Italian born) were awarded the Distinguished Service Cross, the second highest decoration. Italian Americans also accounted for more than 10 percent of war casualties in World War I, despite making up less than 4 percent of the U.S. population.

The war, together with the restrictive Emergency Quota Act of 1921 and Immigration Act of 1924, heavily curtailed Italian immigration. Total annual immigration was capped at 357,000 in 1921 and lowered to 150,000 in 1924. Quotas were allotted on a national basis in proportion to a nationality's existing share of the population. The National Origins Formula, which sought to preserve the existing demographic makeup of the United States and generally favored northwestern European immigration. It assigned Italians, the fifth-largest in national origin of the U.S. population in 1920, only 3.87 percent of the annual immigrant quota. Despite implementation of the quota, the inflow of Italian immigrants remained between 6 or 7 percent of all immigrants. And when the restrictive quota system was abolished by the Immigration and Nationality Act of 1965, Italians had already grown to be the second largest immigrant group in America, with 5,067,717 immigrants from Italy admitted between 1820 and 1966—constituting 12 percent of all immigrants to the United States—more than from Great Britain (4,711,711) and from Ireland (4,706,854).

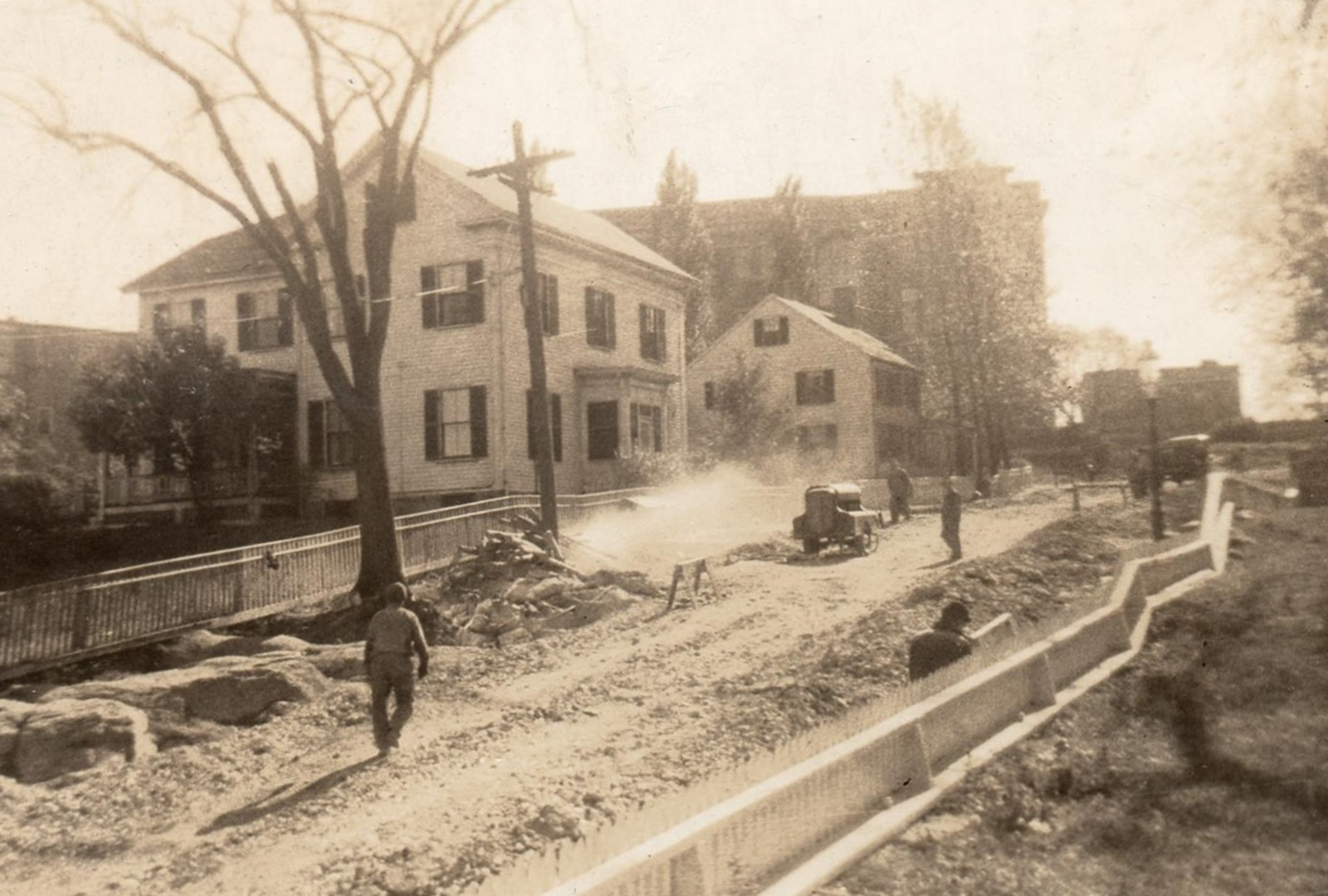
Italian American WPA workers doing roadwork in Dorchester, Boston, 1930s

In the interwar period, jobs as policemen, firemen, and civil servants became increasingly available to Italian Americans. Others found employment as plumbers, electricians, mechanics, and carpenters. By 1920, numerous Little Italys had stabilized and grown considerably more prosperous as workers were able to obtain higher-paying jobs, often in skilled trades. Women found jobs as civil servants, secretaries, dressmakers, and clerks. With better-paying jobs, Italian Americans moved to more affluent neighborhoods outside of the Italian enclaves. The Great Depression (1929–1939) had a major impact on the Italian American community and temporarily reversed some of the earlier gains made. Many unemployed men and some women found jobs on President Franklin Roosevelt's New Deal work programs, such as the Works Progress Administration and the Civilian Conservation Corp.

In politics, Al Smith (Anglicized form of the Italian surname Ferraro) became the first governor of New York of Italian ancestry—although the media characterized him as Irish. He was the first Catholic to receive a major party presidential nomination, as Democratic candidate for president in 1928. He lost Protestant strongholds in the South but energized the Democratic vote in immigrant centers across the entire North. Angelo Rossi was mayor of San Francisco from 1931 to 1944. In 1933–34, Ferdinand Pecora led a Senate investigation of the Wall Street Crash of 1929, which exposed major financial abuses, and spurred Congress to rein in the banking industry.

The Metropolitan Opera continued to flourish under the leadership of Giulio Gatti-Casazza, whose tenure continued until 1935. Rosa Ponselle and Dusolina Giannini, daughters of Italian immigrants, performed regularly at the Metropolitan Opera and became internationally known. Arturo Toscanini returned in the United States as the main conductor of the New York Philharmonic Orchestra (1926–1936) and introduced many Americans to classical music through his NBC Symphony Orchestra radio broadcasts (1937–1954). After helping to "transplant" American jazz music into Germany during the 1920s, Mike Danzi also fled fascism in Europe during 1939 to entertain American audiences at Radio City Music Hall and on Broadway. Popular singers of the period included Russ Columbo, who established a new singing style that influenced Frank Sinatra and other singers that followed. On Broadway, Harry Warren (Salvatore Guaragna) wrote the music for 42nd Street, and received three Academy Awards for his compositions. Other Italian American musicians and performers, such as Jimmy Durante, who later achieved fame in movies and television, were active in vaudeville. Guy Lombardo formed a popular dance band, which played annually on New Year's Eve in New York City's Times Square.

The film industry of this era included Frank Capra, who received three Academy Awards for directing and Frank Borzage, who received two Academy Awards for directing. Italian American cartoonists were responsible for some of the most popular animated characters: Donald Duck was created by Al Taliaferro, Woody Woodpecker was a creation of Walter Lantz (Lanza), Casper the Friendly Ghost was co-created by Joseph Oriolo, and Tom and Jerry were co-created by Joseph Barbera.

In sports, Gene Sarazen (Eugenio Saraceni) won both the Professional Golf Association and U.S. Open Tournaments in 1922. Pete DePaolo won the Indianapolis 500 in 1925. Tony Canzoneri won the lightweight boxing championship in 1930, and Rocky Marciano is the only undefeated heavyweight champion in history. Joe DiMaggio, who was destined to become one of the most famous players in baseball history, began playing for the New York Yankees in 1936. Louis Zamperini, the American distance runner, competed in the 1936 Olympics and later became the subject of the bestselling book Unbroken by Laura Hillenbrand, published in 2010 and a 2014 movie of the same title.

Italian Americans employed traditional Italian skills in growing and selling fresh fruits and vegetables, which were cultivated on small tracts of land in the suburban parts of many cities. In California, the DiGiorgio Corporation was founded, which grew to become a national supplier of fresh produce in the United States. Italian Americans in California were leading growers of grapes and producers of wine. Many well known wine brands, such as Mondavi, Carlo Rossi, Petri, Sebastiani, and Gallo emerged from these early enterprises. Italian American companies were major importers of Italian wines, processed foods, textiles, marble, and manufactured goods. Italian Americans continued their significant involvement in the labor movement during this period. Well-known labor organizers included Carlo Tresca, Luigi Antonini, James Petrillo, and Angela Bambace.

Benito Mussolini's Fascist regime in Italy sought to build a base of popular support in the United States, focusing on the Italian community. His supporters far outnumbered his opponents, both inside the Italian American community and among all Catholics, as well as among the wider American leadership.) According to Stefano Luconi, in the 1920s and 1930s "numerous Italian Americans became US citizens, registered for the vote, and cast their ballots in order to lobby Congress and the Presidency on behalf of fascism and to support Mussolini's goals in foreign policy." According to Fraser Ottanelli, Rome also worked to enhance Italy's reputation through a series of highly visible moves. They included participating in the Century of Progress (1933–1934) world fair in Chicago; supporting Italo Balbo's dramatic transatlantic flights; and donating a statue to Chicago. A minority of Italian Americans who fervently opposed fascism did not support Rome's moves. They promoted an unsuccessful measure in Congress that condemned Italy's meddling in U.S. internal affairs and called for the revocation of U.S. citizenship from people who swore allegiance to Mussolini. Alberto Tarchiani, Italy's first ambassador to the United States after World War II, requested the removal of any displays that honored the fascist regime, but with little success. Many memorials remain in the 21st century.

=== World War II ===
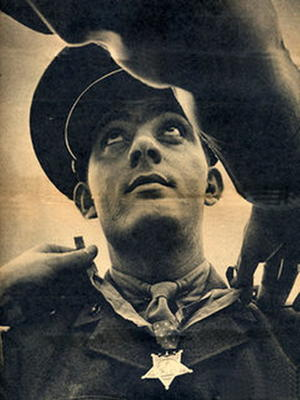
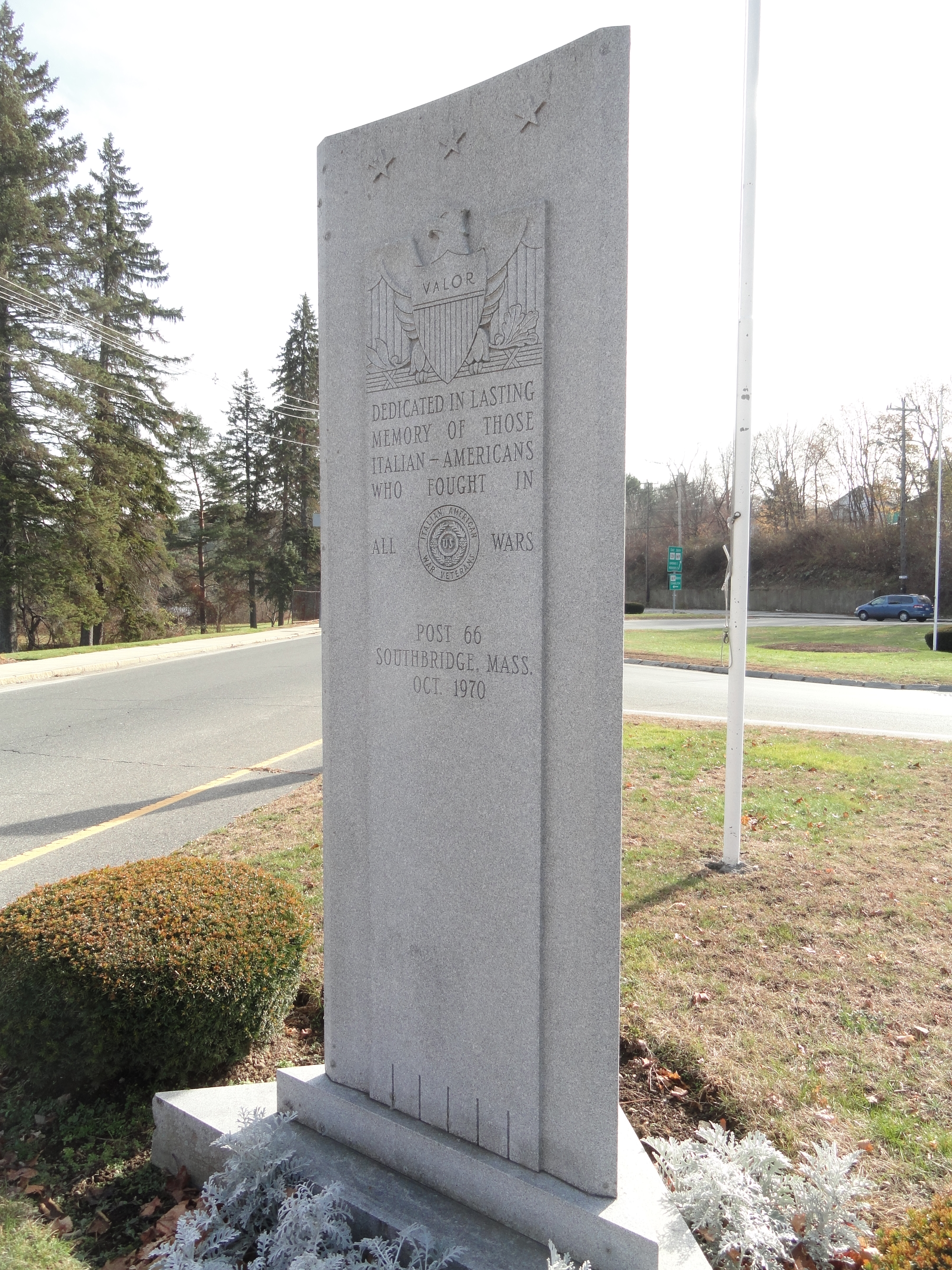
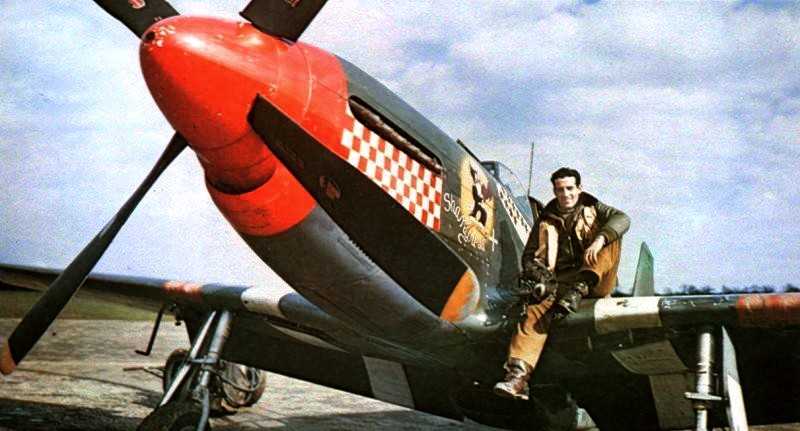
Clockwise from top:
- John Basilone, recipient of the Medal of Honor
- Italian American veterans memorial of all wars, Southbridge, Massachusetts
- Dominic Gentile on the wing of his P-51B Shangri-La

As a member of the Axis powers, Italy declared war on the United States on December 11, 1941, four days after Japan attacked Pearl Harbor. Although many Italian Americans admired Mussolini in the 1930s, very few if any demonstrated a desire to transfer fascist ideology to America. When Italy entered the war on the side of Nazi Germany in 1940, "most Italian Americans distanced themselves from Fascism." Anti-fascist Italian expatriates in the United States founded the Mazzini Society in 1939 to work toward ending fascist rule in Italy.

Between 750,000 and 1.5 million people of Italian descent are thought to have served in the U.S. armed forces during the war, about 10 percent of the total, and 14 Italian Americans received the Medal of Honor for their service. The work of Enrico Fermi was crucial in developing the atom bomb.

In the realm of international cultural diplomacy, Alfredo Antonini joined forces with John Serry during World War II on La Cadena de las Americas to support President Franklin Roosevelt's policy of pan-americanism while also helping to introduce the romantic bolero to large audiences in the United States.

World War II ended the mass unemployment and relief programs that characterized the 1930s, opening up new employment opportunities for large numbers of Italian Americans, who significantly contributed to the nation's war effort. Much of the Italian American population was concentrated in urban areas where the new war materiel plants were located. Many Italian American women took war jobs, such as Rose Bonavita, who was recognized by President Franklin D. Roosevelt with a personal letter commending her for her performance as an aircraft riveter. She, together with a number of other women workers, provided the basis of the name, "Rosie the Riveter", which came to symbolize the millions of American women workers in the war industries. Chef Boyardee, the company founded by Ettore Boiardi, was one of the largest suppliers of rations for U.S. and allied forces during World War II.

==== Wartime violation of Italian-American civil liberties ====
From the onset of the Second World War, and particularly following Pearl Harbor attack, Italian Americans were increasingly placed under suspicion. As a consequence, Executive Order 9066 called for the compulsory relocation of more than 10,000 Italian Americans and restricted the movements of more than 600,000 Italian Americans nationwide, and the Department of Justice classified unnaturalized Italian Americans as "enemy aliens" under the Alien and Sedition Act. Thousands of Italians were arrested, and hundreds of Italians were interned in military camps, some for up to two years. As many as 600,000 others were required to carry identity cards identifying them as "resident aliens." Thousands more on the West Coast were required to move inland, often losing their homes and businesses in the process. They were targeted despite a lack of evidence that Italians were conducting spy or sabotage operations in the United States. On November 7, 2000, Bill Clinton signed the Wartime Violation of Italian American Civil Liberties Act. This act ordered a comprehensive review by the attorney general of the United States of the treatment of Italian Americans during the Second World War. The findings concluded that:

1. The freedom of more than 600,000 Italian-born immigrants in the United States and their families was restricted during World War II by government measures that branded them "enemy aliens" and included requirements to carry identification cards, travel restrictions, and seizure of personal property.
2. During World War II, more than 10,000 Italian Americans living on the West Coast were forced to leave their homes and prohibited from entering coastal zones. More than 50,000 were subjected to curfews.
3. During World War II, thousands of Italian American immigrants were arrested, and hundreds were interned in military camps.
4. Hundreds of thousands of Italian Americans performed exemplary service and thousands sacrificed their lives in defense of the United States.
5. At the time, Italians were the largest foreign-born group in the United States, and today they are the fifth-largest immigrant group in the United States, numbering approximately 15 million.
6. The impact of the wartime experience was devastating to Italian American communities in the United States, and its effects are still being felt.
7. A deliberate policy kept these measures from the public during the war. Even today much information is still classified, the full story remains unknown to the public, and it has never been acknowledged in any official capacity by the United States government.

In 2010, California officially issued an apology to the Italian Americans whose civil liberties had been violated.

=== Post–World War II period ===
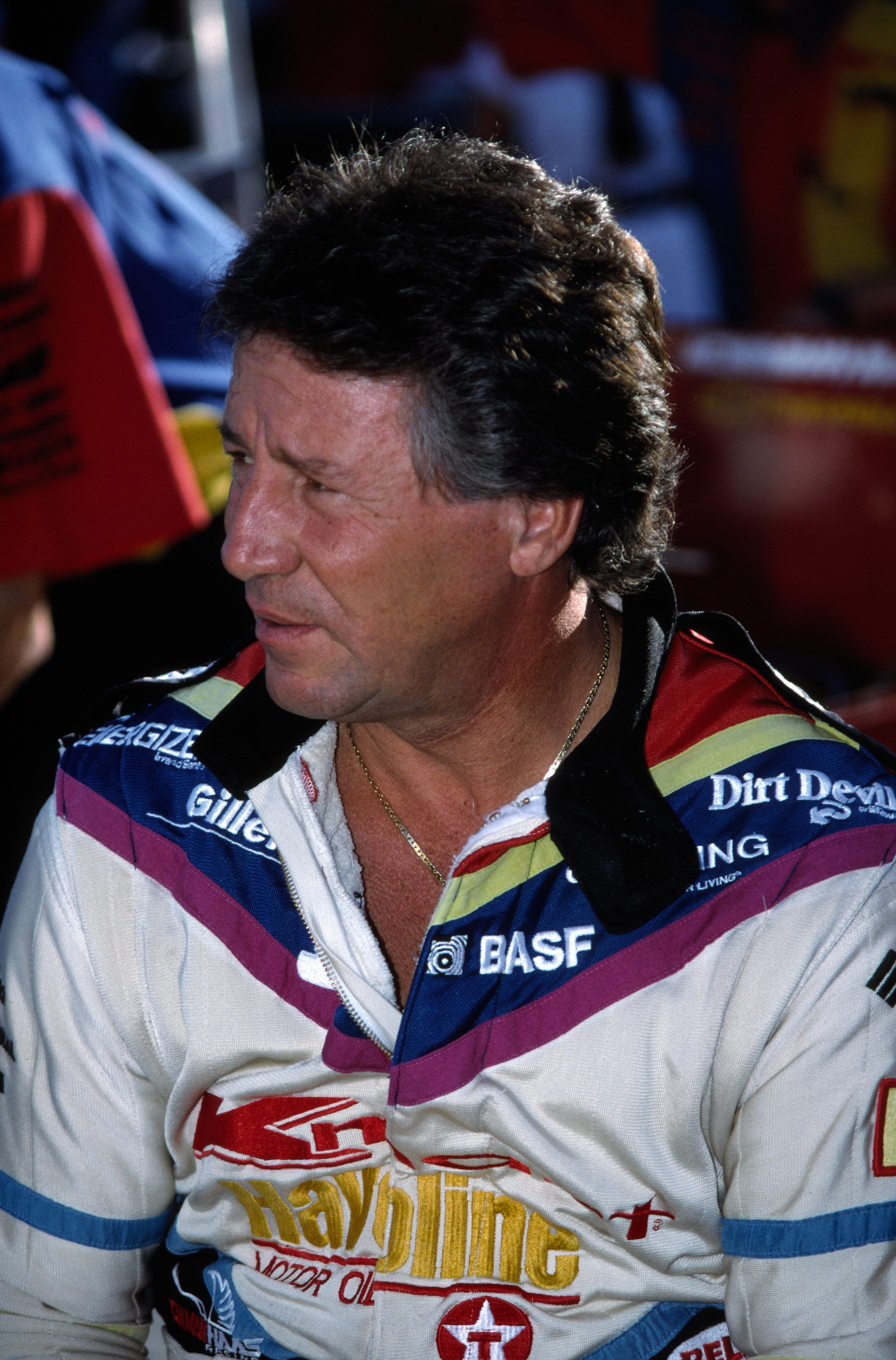
Mario Andretti, one of the most successful drivers in the history of motorsports

Italians continued to immigrate to the United States, and an estimated 600,000 arrived in the decades following the war. Many of the new arrivals had professional training or were skilled in various trades. The post-war period was a time of great social change for Italian Americans. Many aspired to a college education, which became possible for returning veterans through the GI Bill. Since the 1960s, a lot of people left Italy and went to North America (mostly), South America, and Europe. European migration was seasonal and permanent. With better job opportunities and better educated, Italian Americans entered mainstream American life in great numbers. The Italian enclaves were abandoned by many who chose to live in other urban areas and in the suburbs. Many married outside of their ethnic group, most frequently with other ethnic Catholics, but increasingly also with those of diverse religious and ethnic backgrounds. According to Dr. Richard D. Alba, director of the Center for Social and Demographic Analysis at the State University of New York at Albany, 8 percent of Americans of Italian descent born before 1920 had mixed ancestry, but 70 percent of them born after 1970 were the children of intermarriage. In 1985, among Americans of Italian descent under the age of 30, 72 percent of men and 64 percent of women married someone with no Italian background. Numerous Italian Americans are people of color, including many people of mixed African-African and white Italian ancestry. Notable Black Italian-Americans include Pittsburgh Steeler running back Franco Harris.

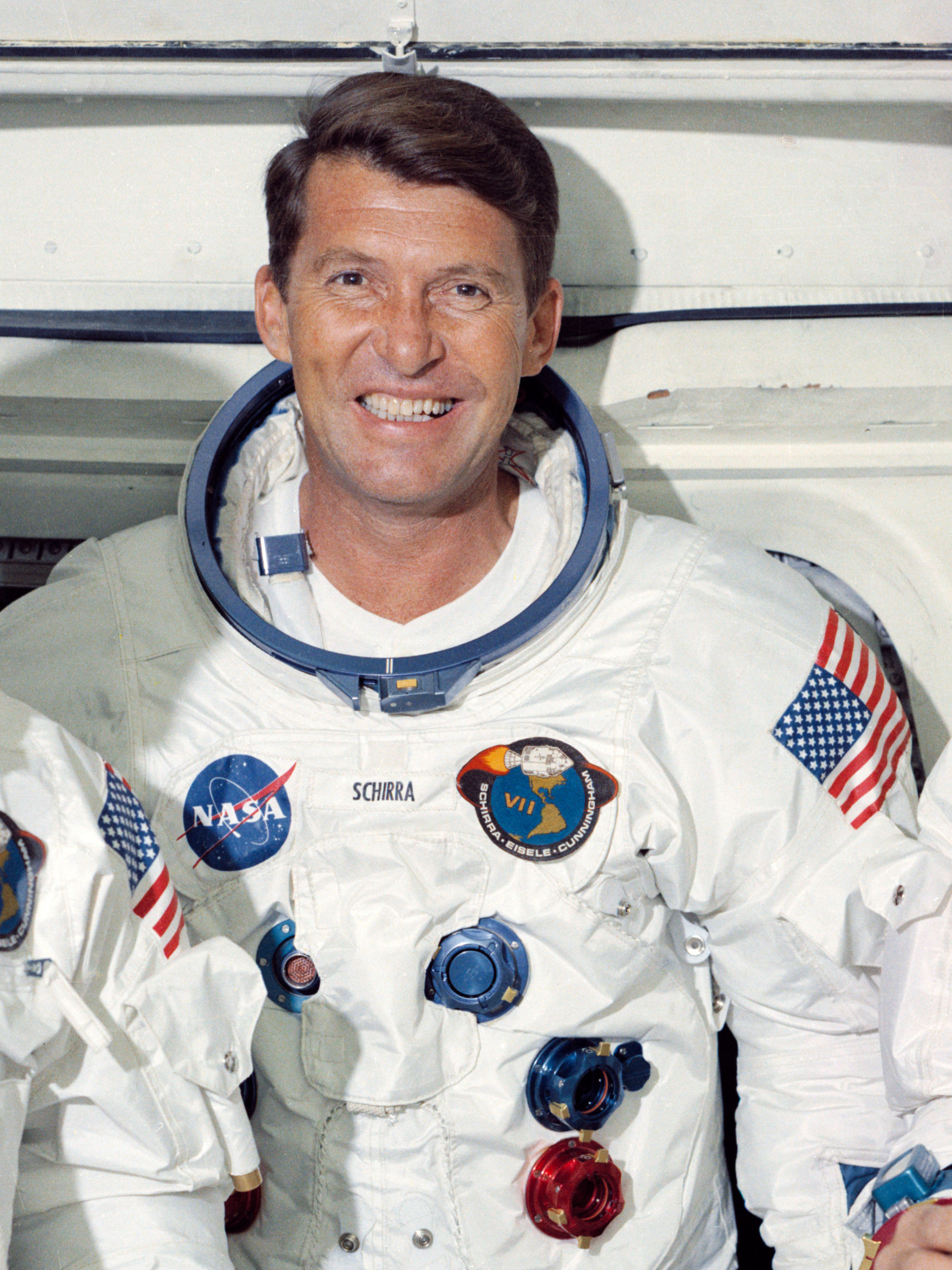
Wally Schirra, one of the earliest NASA astronauts to enter into space (1962), taking part in the Mercury Seven program and later Gemini and Apollo programs

Italian Americans took advantage of the new opportunities that generally became available to all in the post-war decades. They made many significant contributions to American life and culture.

Numerous Italian Americans became involved in politics at the local, state, and national levels in the post-war decades. Those who became U.S. senators included John Pastore of Rhode Island, who was the first Italian American elected to the Senate in 1950; Pete Domenici, who was elected to the U.S. Senate from New Mexico in 1972 and served six terms; Patrick Leahy, who was elected to the U.S. Senate from Vermont in 1974 and served until 2023; and Alfonse D'Amato, who served as U.S. senator from New York from 1981 to 1999. Nancy Pelosi was both the first woman and the first Italian American Speaker of the House. Anthony Celebrezze served for five two-year terms as mayor of Cleveland, from 1953 to 1962 and, in 1962, President John F. Kennedy appointed him as United States Secretary of Health, Education, and Welfare (now the Department of Health and Human Services). Benjamin Civiletti served as the United States Attorney General during the last year and a half of the Carter administration, from 1979 to 1981. Frank Carlucci served as the United States Secretary of Defense from 1987 to 1989 in the administration of President Ronald Reagan.

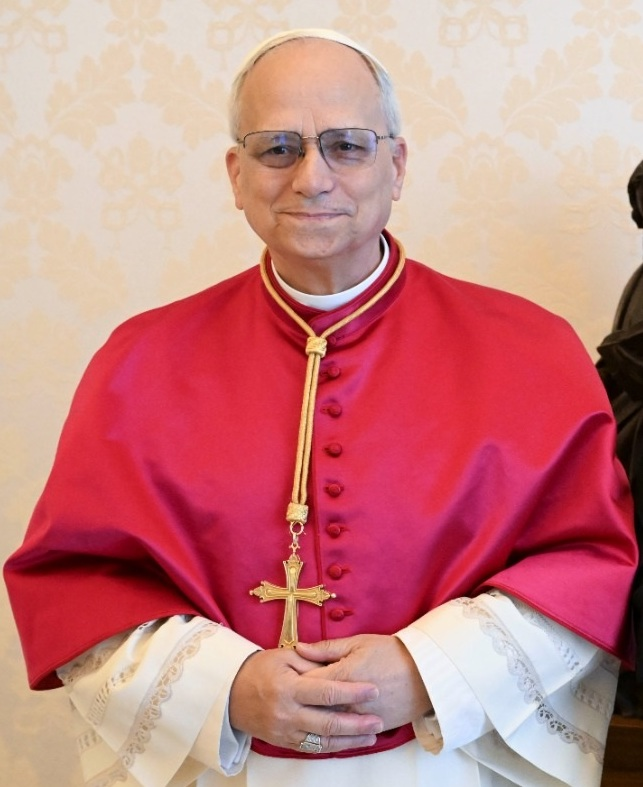
Pope Leo XIV. His paternal grandfather's family name was Riggitano, a Sicilian immigrant from Milazzo

Italian Americans founded many successful enterprises, both small and large, in the post-war decades, including Barnes & Noble, Tropicana Products, Zamboni, Transamerica, Subway, Mr. Coffee, and Conair Corporation. Other enterprises founded by Italian Americans were Fairleigh Dickinson University, the Eternal Word Television Network, and the Syracuse Nationals basketball team – later to become the Philadelphia 76ers. Robert Panara was a co-founder of the National Technical Institute for the Deaf and founder of the National Theater of the Deaf. Recognized as a pioneer in deaf culture studies in the United States, he was honored with a commemorative U.S. stamp in 2017.

Eight Italian Americans became Nobel Prize laureates in the post-war decades: Mario Capecchi, Renato Dulbecco, Riccardo Giacconi, Salvatore Luria, Franco Modigliani, Rita Levi Montalcini, Emilio G. Segrè, and Carolyn Bertozzi.

Italian Americans continued to serve with distinction in the military, with 4 Medal of Honor recipients in the Korean War and 11 in the Vietnam War, including Vincent R. Capodanno, a Catholic chaplain.

At the close of the 20th century, 31 men and women of Italian descent were serving in the U.S. House and Senate, 82 of the 1,000 largest U.S. cities had mayors of Italian descent, and 166 college and university presidents were of Italian descent. An Italian American, Antonin Scalia, was serving as a U.S. Supreme Court justice, who was later joined by Samuel Alito in 2006. More than two dozen Italian Americans were serving in the Catholic Church as bishops. Four—Joseph Bernardin, Justin Rigali, Anthony Bevilacqua, and Daniel DiNardo—had been elevated to Cardinals.

Italian Americans served with distinction in all of America's wars, and over 30 have been awarded the Medal of Honor. A number of Italian Americans have served as top-ranking generals in the military, including Anthony Zinni, Raymond Odierno, Carl Vuono, and Peter Pace, the latter three having also been appointed Chief of Staff of their respective services. Over two dozen of Italian descent have been elected as state governors including, most recently, Paul Cellucci of Massachusetts, John Baldacci of Maine, Janet Napolitano of Arizona, and Donald Carcieri of Rhode Island.

== Influence on American culture and society ==
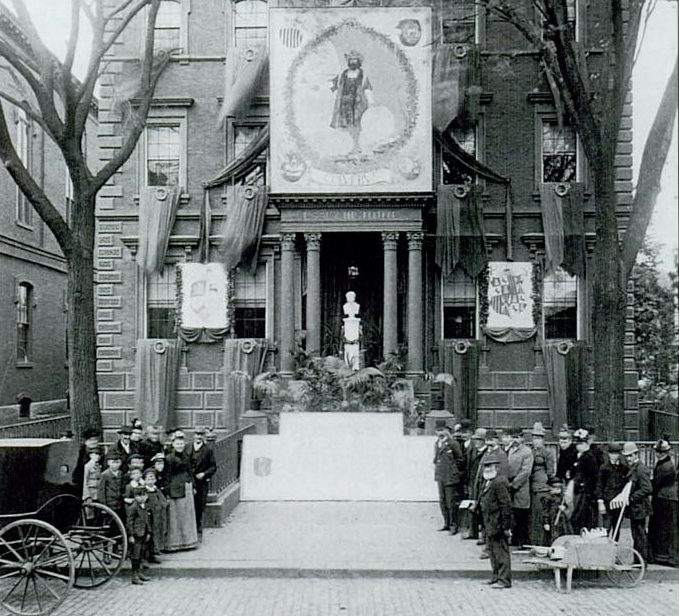
Columbus Day in Salem, Massachusetts in 1892

Italian Americans have influenced the American culture and society in a variety of ways, such as: foods, coffees and desserts; wine production (in California and elsewhere in the U.S.); popular music, starting in the 1940s and 1950s, and continuing into the present; operatic, classical and instrumental music; jazz; fashion and design; cinema, literature, Italianate architecture, in homes, churches, and public buildings; Montessori schools; Christmas crèches; fireworks displays; and sports (e.g. bocce and beach tennis).

The historical figure of Christopher Columbus is commemorated on Columbus Day and is reflected in numerous monuments, city names, names of institutions, the name of the capital city of the United States, and the poetic name, "Columbia,” for the United States itself. Italian Americans strongly identify with the Genoese explorer, whose fame lay in his grand voyages departing Europe and crossing the Atlantic Ocean to make discoveries in the New World, and which played an important role in American, Italian, European, Pan-American and Western histories and national identities. This emphasis on identification with a specific historical figure differs, however, from the generalized national preoccupations of Irish Americans with the political situation in Ireland throughout the 20th century and American Jews' deep personal investment in the fate of Israel, though many Italian Americans maintained in the past and continue to maintain strong ties to and investment in Italy and its affairs. Italy as a sovereign state allows dual citizenship without restrictions, as well as birthright acquisition of citizenship for certain qualifying members of the diaspora.

=== Politics ===
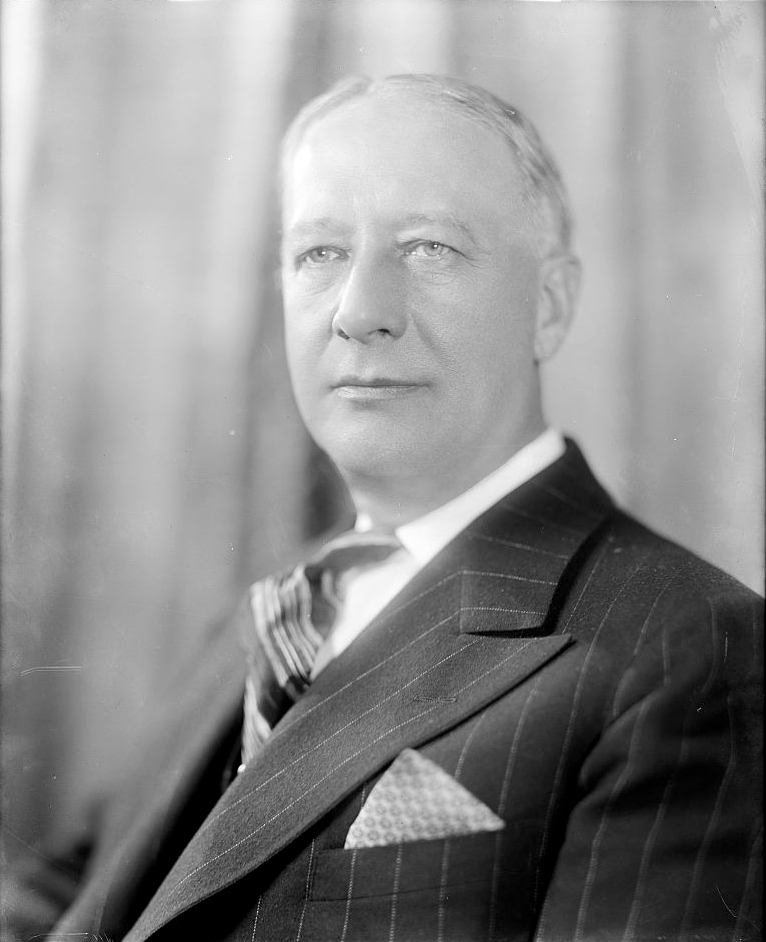
Al Smith, governor of New York in the 1920s. His father, Alfred Emanuele Ferraro, was of Italian and German descent.

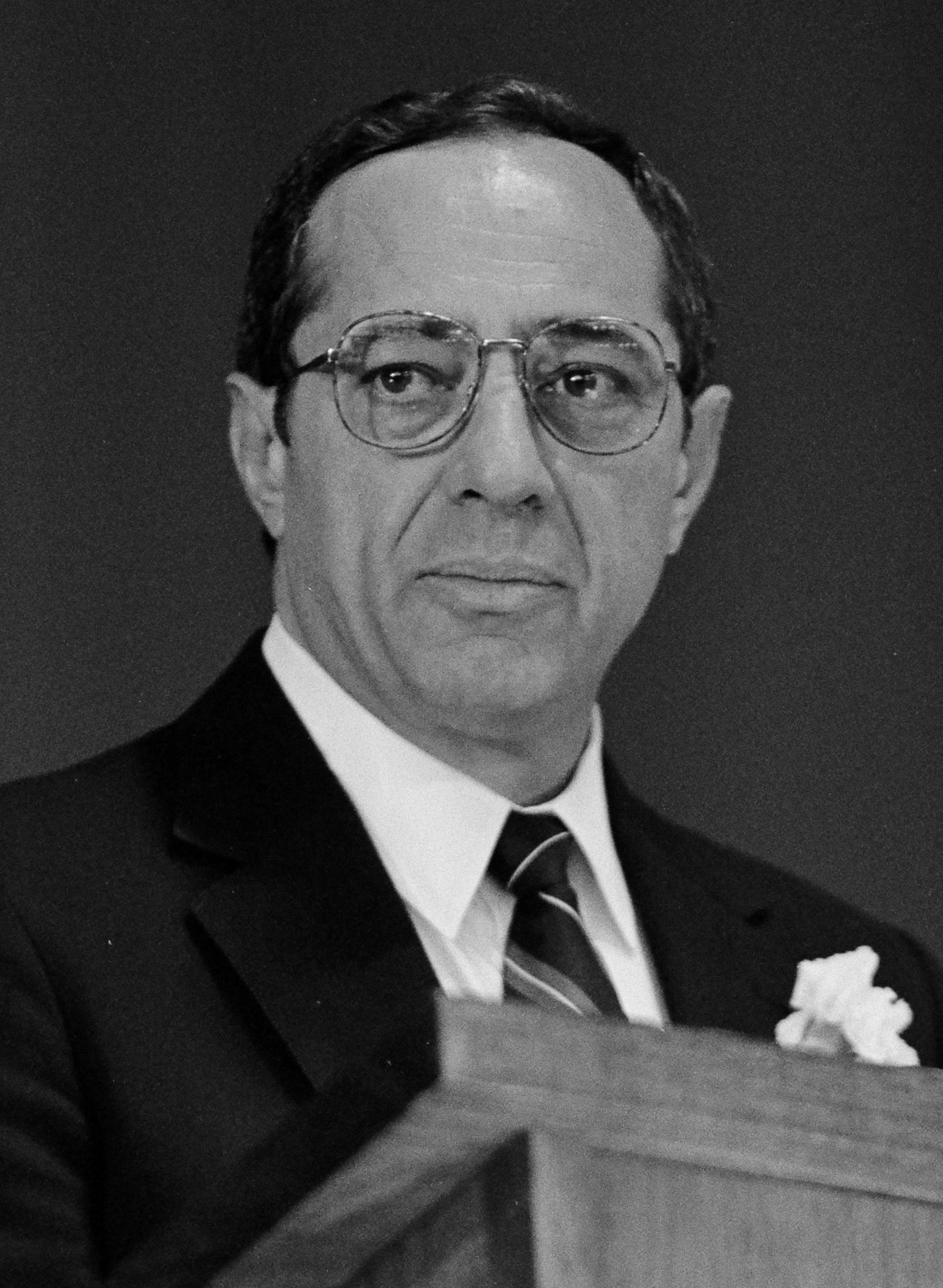
Mario Cuomo, first New York governor to identify with the Italian community

In the 1930s, Italian Americans voted heavily Democratic. Carmine DeSapio in the late 1940s became the first to break the Irish Catholic hold on Tammany Hall since the 1870s. By 1951, more than twice as many Italian American legislators as in 1936 served in the six states with the most Italian Americans. Since 1968, voters have split about evenly between the Democratic (37 percent) and the Republican (36 percent) parties. The U.S. Congress includes Italian Americans who are leaders in both the Republican and Democratic parties. In 2007, Nancy Pelosi (D-CA) became the first woman and Italian American Speaker of the United States House of Representatives. Former Republican New York City mayor Rudy Giuliani was a candidate for the U.S. presidency in the 2008 election. Mike Pompeo, American politician, diplomat, businessman, and attorney, served as the 70th United States secretary of state from 2018 to 2021. Ron DeSantis, governor of Florida since 2019, is of Italian ancestry. Geraldine Ferraro was the first woman on a major party ticket, running for vice president as a Democrat in 1984. Two justices of the Supreme Court have been Italian Americans, Antonin Scalia and Samuel Alito. Both were appointed by Republican presidents, Scalia by Ronald Reagan and Alito by George W. Bush.

The Italian American Congressional Delegation currently includes 30 members of Congress who are of Italian descent. They are joined by more than 150 associate members, who are not Italian American but have large Italian American constituencies. Since its founding in 1975, the National Italian American Foundation (NIAF) has worked closely with the bicameral and bipartisan Italian American Congressional Delegation, which is led by co-chairs Rep. Bill Pascrell of New Jersey and Rep. Pat Tiberi of Ohio.

By the 1890s, Italian Americans in New York City were mobilizing as a political force. They helped elect Fiorello La Guardia (a Republican) as mayor in 1933, and helped reelect him in 1937 and 1941. They rallied for Vincent R. Impellitteri (a Democrat) in 1950, and Rudolph W. Giuliani (a Republican) in 1989 (when he lost), and in 1993 and 1997 (when he won). All three Italian Americans aggressively fought to reduce crime in the city; each was known for his good relations with the city's powerful labor unions. La Guardia and Giuliani have had the reputation among specialists on urban politics as two of the best mayors in American history. Democrat Bill de Blasio, the third mayor of Italian ancestry, served as the 109th mayor of New York City for two terms, from 2014 to 2021. Mario Cuomo (a Democrat) served as the 52nd governor of New York for three terms, from 1983 to 1995. His son Andrew Cuomo was the 56th governor of New York and previously served as secretary of housing and urban development from 1997 to 2001 and as the attorney general of New York from 2007 to 2010.

However, in contrast to other ethnic groups, Italian Americans demonstrate a marked lack of ethnocentrism and long history of political individualism, eschewing ethnic bloc voting, preferring to vote on the basis of individual candidates and issues, embracing maverick political candidates over ethnic loyalties. Popular New York Mayor Fiorello La Guardia in fact underperformed among his own demographic; in 1941, La Guardia even lost the Italian vote to his Irish opponent William O'Dwyer. In 1965, when New York Democrats backed Mario Procaccino, an Italian-born candidate for city comptroller, Procaccino lost the Italian vote and won his election only because of support in Jewish voter precincts. In the 1973 New York City mayoral election, the son of Italian immigrants Mario Biaggi failed to unite Italian voters as an ethnic bloc the way his Jewish opponent Abraham Beame could do to win the Democratic primary. In the 1962 Massachusetts gubernatorial election, incumbent Italian American Governor John Volpe lost his re-election campaign by a razor-thin 0.2 percent—a final margin that could be more than sufficiently explained by Volpe polling only 51 percent among the state's significant population of Italian Americans, roughly half of whom voted for old-line Anglo-Saxon Protestant Endicott Peabody over a fellow ethnic.

=== Economic and Social Conditions ===
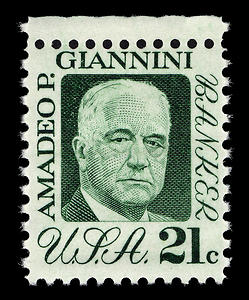
1973 U.S. postage stamp featuring Amadeo Giannini

Italian Americans have played a prominent role in the economy of the United States, and have founded companies of great national importance, such as Bank of America (by Amadeo Giannini in 1904), Qualcomm, Subway, Home Depot, and Airbnb among many others. Italian Americans have also made important contributions to the growth of the U.S. economy through their business expertise. Italian Americans have served as CEO's of numerous major corporations, such as the Ford Motor Company and Chrysler Corporation by Lee Iacocca, IBM Corporation by Samuel Palmisano, Lucent Technologies by Patricia Russo, the New York Stock Exchange by Richard Grasso, Honeywell Incorporated by Michael Bonsignore, and Intel by Paul Otellini. Economist Franco Modigliani was awarded the Nobel Prize in Economics "for his pioneering analyses of saving and of financial markets." Economist Eugene Fama was awarded the Nobel Memorial Prize in Economic Sciences in 2013 for his contribution to the empirical analysis of portfolio theory, asset pricing, and the efficient-market hypothesis.

About two-thirds of America's Italian immigrants arrived during 1900–1914. Many were of agrarian backgrounds, with little formal education and industrial skills, who became manual laborers heavily concentrated in the cities. Others came with traditional Italian skills as tailors; barbers; bricklayers; stonemasons and stone cutters; marble, tile, and terrazzo workers; fishermen; musicians; singers; shoemakers and shoe repairers; cooks and bakers; carpenters; grape growers; wine makers; silk makers; and dressmakers and seamstresses. Others came to provide for the needs of the immigrant communities, notably doctors, dentists, midwives, lawyers, teachers, morticians, priests, nuns, and brothers. Many of the skilled workers found work in their specialty, first in the Italian enclaves and eventually in the broader society. Traditional skills were often passed down from father to son and from mother to daughter.

By the second generation, approximately 70 percent of the men had blue-collar jobs, and the proportion was down to approximately 50 percent in the third generation, according to surveys in 1963. By 1987, the level of Italian American income exceeded the national average, and since the 1950s, it grew faster than any other ethnic group except the Jews. By 1990, according to the U.S. census, more than 65 percent of Italian Americans were employed as managerial, professional, or white-collar workers. In 1999, the median annual income of Italian-American families was $61,300, while the median annual income of all American families was $50,000.

A University of Chicago study of 15 ethnic groups showed that Italian Americans were among those groups having the lowest percentages of divorced people, unemployed people, people on welfare, and people incarcerated. On the other hand, they were among those groups with the highest percentages of two-parent families, elderly family members still living at home, and families who eat together on a regular basis.

=== Science ===
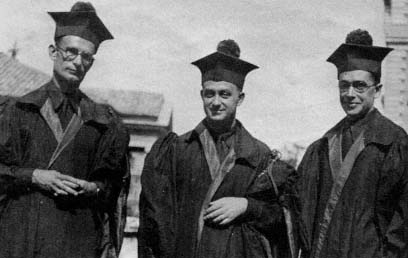
Enrico Fermi between Franco Rasetti (left) and Emilio Segrè in academic dress

Italian Americans have been responsible for major breakthroughs in virtually all fields of science, including engineering, medicine, and physics. Physicist and Nobel Prize laureate Enrico Fermi was the creator of the world's first nuclear reactor, the Chicago Pile-1, and among the leading scientists involved in the Manhattan Project during World War II. One of Fermi's main collaborators, Franco Rasetti, was awarded the Charles Doolittle Walcott Medal by the National Academy of Sciences for his contributions to Cambrian paleontology. Federico Faggin developed the first microchip and microprocessor. Alberto Sangiovanni-Vincentelli was a key figure whose pioneering technical developments and entrepreneurial drive established the standard chip software-design tool used across the world today. Robert Gallo led research that identified a cancer-causing virus. Anthony Fauci in 2008 was awarded the Presidential Medal of Freedom for his work on the AIDS relief program PEPFAR. Astrophysicist Riccardo Giacconi was awarded the 2002 Nobel Prize in Physics for his contributions to the discovery of cosmic X-ray sources. Virologist Renato Dulbecco won the 1975 Nobel Prize in Physiology or Medicine for his work on oncoviruses. Pharmacologist Louis Ignarro was co-recipient of the 1998 Nobel Prize in Physiology or Medicine for demonstrating the signaling properties of nitric oxide. Microbiologist Salvador Luria won the Nobel Prize in Physiology or Medicine in 1969 for his contribution to major discoveries on the replication mechanism and the genetic structure of viruses. Physicist William Daniel Phillips in 1997 won the Nobel Prize in Physics for his contributions to laser cooling. Physicist Emilio Segrè discovered the elements technetium and astatine, and the antiproton, a subatomic antiparticle, for which he was awarded the Nobel Prize in Physics in 1959. Nine Italian Americans, including a woman, have gone into space as astronauts: Wally Schirra, Dominic Antonelli, Charles Camarda, Mike Massimino, Richard Mastracchio, Ronald Parise, Mario Runco, Albert Sacco, and Nicole Marie Passonno Stott. Rocco Petrone was the third director of the NASA Marshall Space Flight Center, from 1973 to 1974.

=== Women ===
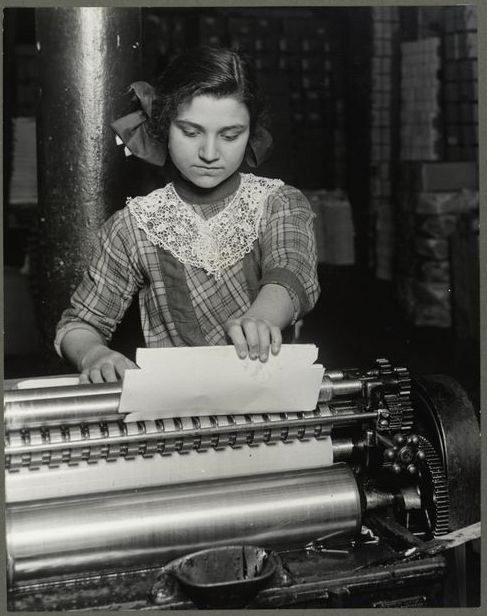
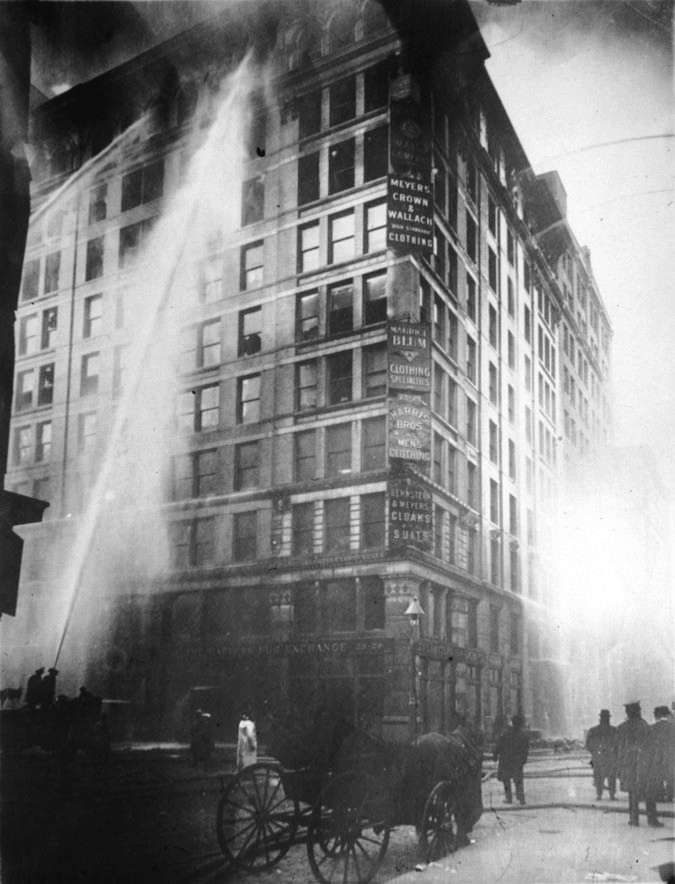

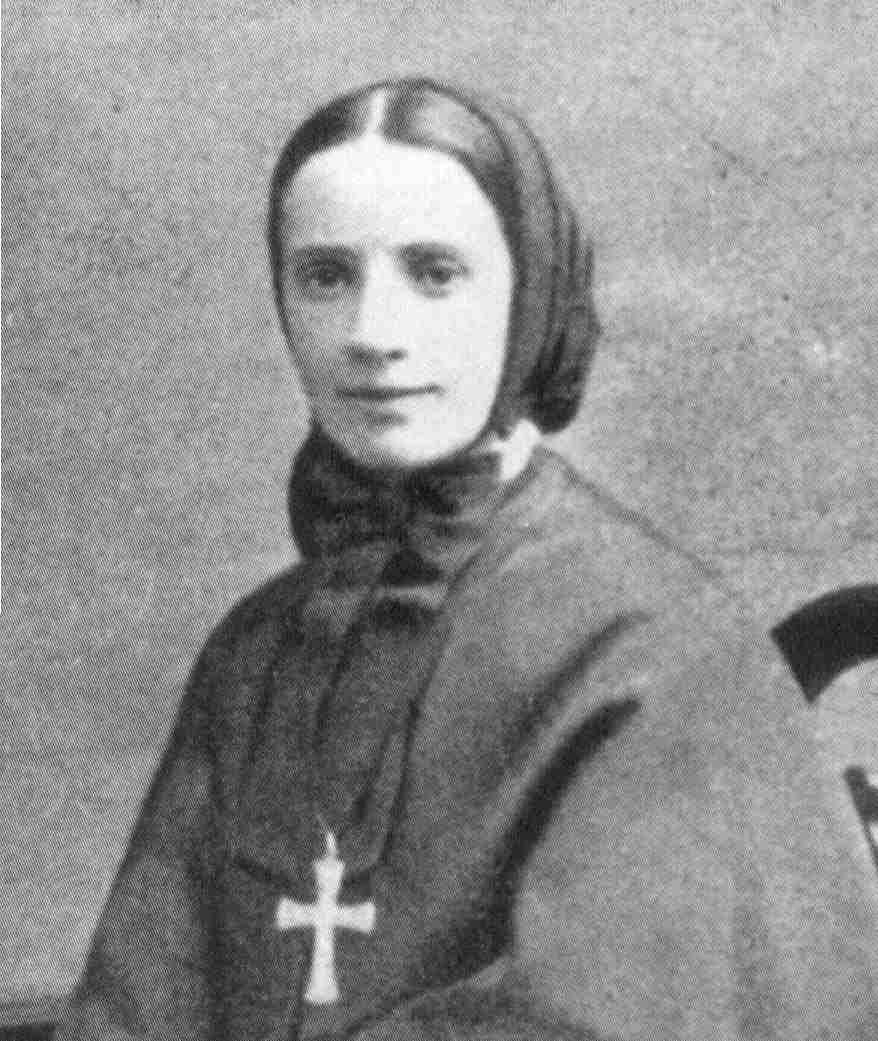
Mother Cabrini

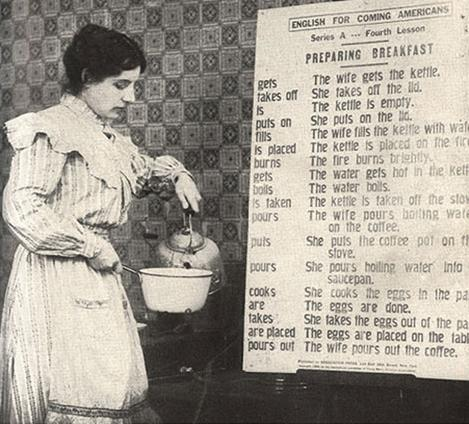
Clockwise from top:
- A fourteen year old Italian girl working at a paper-box factory (1913)
- The Triangle Shirtwaist Factory fire in 1911, more than one quarter of the victims were Italian immigrant women
- An Italian immigrant making an American breakfast aided by instructional materials from the YMCA
- Mother Cabrini

Italian women who arrived during the period of mass immigration had to adapt to new and unfamiliar social and economic conditions. Mothers, who had the task of raising the children and providing for the welfare of the family, commonly demonstrated great courage and resourcefulness in meeting those obligations, often under adverse living conditions. Their cultural traditions, which placed the highest priority on the family, remained strong as Italian immigrant women adapted to these new circumstances.

To assist the immigrants in the Little Italys, who were overwhelmingly Catholic, Pope Leo XIII dispatched a contingent of priests, nuns, and brothers of the Missionaries of St. Charles Borromeo and other orders. Among these was Sister Francesca Cabrini, who founded dozens of schools, hospitals, and orphanages. She was canonized as the first American saint in 1946.

Married women typically avoided factory work and chose home-based economic activities such as dressmaking, taking in boarders, and operating small shops in their homes or neighborhoods. Italian neighborhoods also proved attractive to midwives, women who trained in Italy before coming to America. Many single women were employed in the garment industry as seamstresses, often in unsafe working environments. Many of the 146 who died in the Triangle Shirtwaist Factory fire in 1911 were Italian American women. Angela Bambace was an 18-year-old Italian American organizer for the International Ladies Garment Workers Union in New York who worked to secure better working conditions and shorter hours for women workers in the garment industry.

After World War II, Italian American women acquired an increasing degree of freedom in choosing a career and seeking higher levels of education. Consequently, the second half of the 20th century was a period in which Italian American women excelled in virtually all fields of endeavor. In politics, Geraldine Ferraro was the first woman vice presidential candidate, Ella Grasso was the first woman elected as a state governor, and Nancy Pelosi was the first woman Speaker of the House. In 1980, Mother Angelica (Rita Rizzo), a Franciscan nun, founded the Eternal Word Television Network (EWTN), a network viewed regularly by millions of Catholics. JoAnn Falletta was the first woman to become a permanent conductor of a major symphony orchestra (with both the Virginia Symphony Orchestra and the Buffalo Philharmonic Orchestra). Penny Marshall (Masciarelli) was one of the first women directors in Hollywood. Catherine DeAngelis, M.D., was the first woman editor of the Journal of the American Medical Association. Patricia Fili-Krushel was the first woman president of ABC Television. Bonnie Tiburzi was the first woman pilot in commercial aviation history. Patricia Russo was the first woman to become CEO of Lucent Technologies. Karen Ignagni was the first woman to serve as the CEO of American Health Insurance Plans, an umbrella organization representing all major HMOs in the country. Nicole Marie Passonno Stott was one of the first women to go into space as an astronaut. Carolyn Porco, a world recognized expert in planetary probes, is the leader of the imaging science team for the Cassini probe, which orbited Saturn.

The National Organization of Italian American Women (NOIAW), founded in 1980, is an organization for women of Italian heritage committed to preserving Italian heritage, language, and culture by promoting and supporting the advancement of women of Italian ancestry.

=== Religion ===
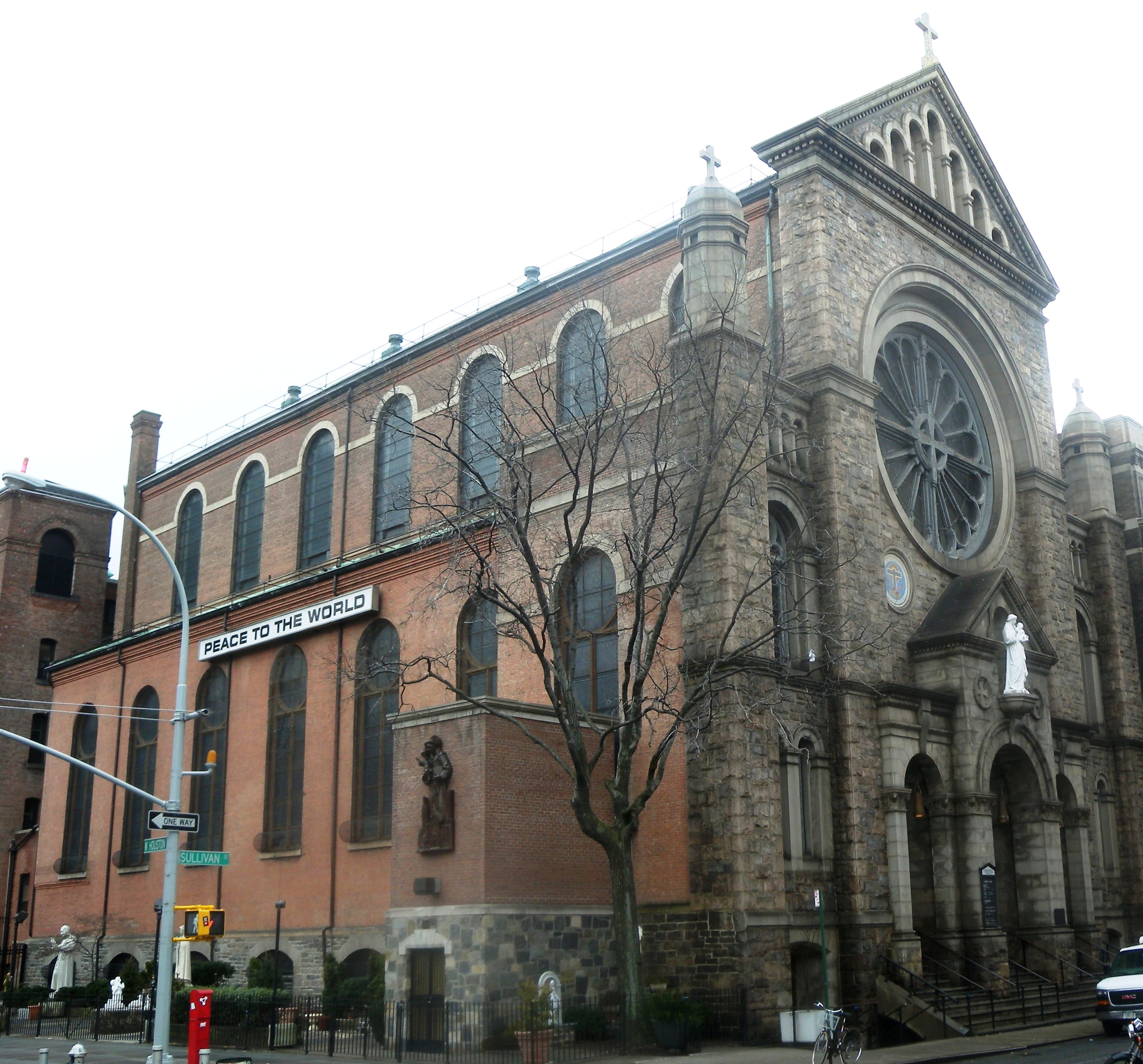
St. Anthony of Padua Church in New York was established in 1859 as the first parish in the United States formed specifically to serve the Italian immigrant community.

The majority of Italian Americans are Catholics, although Catholic affiliation among Italian American adults has fallen from 89 percent in 1972 to 56 percent in 2010 (-33 percentage points). By 1910, Italian Americans had founded 219 Catholic churches and 41 parochial schools, served by 315 priests and 254 nuns, 2 Catholic seminaries, and 3 orphanages. Four hundred Italian Jesuit priests left Italy for the American West between 1848 and 1919. Most of these Jesuits left their homeland involuntarily, expelled by Italian nationalists in the successive waves of Italian unification that dominated Italy. When they came to the West, they ministered to Native Americans in the Northwest, Irish-Americans in San Francisco, and Mexican Americans in the Southwest. They also ran the nation's most influential Catholic seminary, in Woodstock, Maryland. In addition to their pastoral work, they founded numerous high schools and colleges, including Regis University, Santa Clara University, the University of San Francisco, and Gonzaga University.

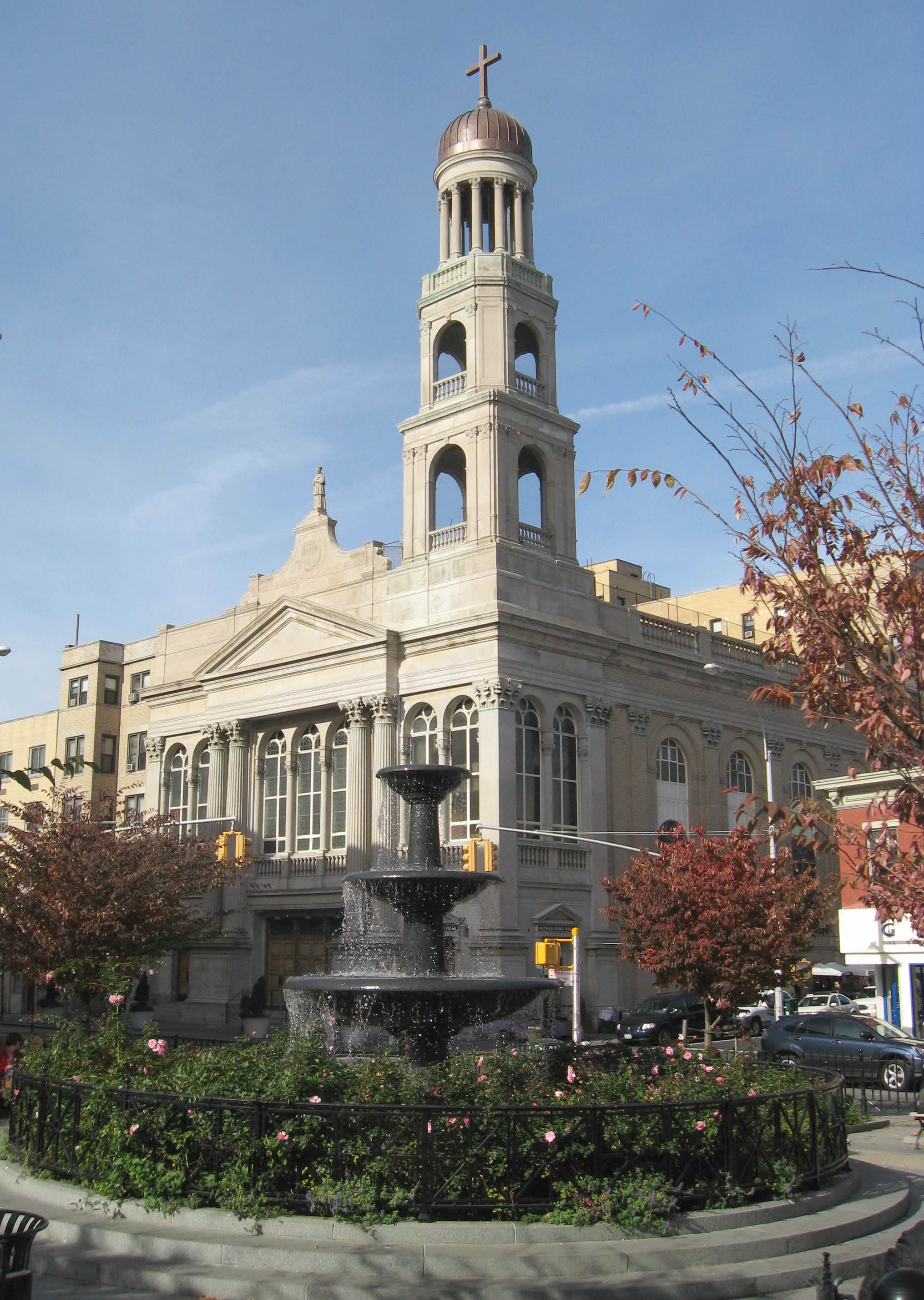
Our Lady of Pompeii Church in New York was founded in 1892 as a national parish to serve Italian-American immigrants who settled in Greenwich Village.

While most Italian American families have a Catholic background, about 19 percent self-identified as Protestant in 2010. In the early 20th century, about 300 Protestant missionaries worked in urban Italian American neighborhoods. Some have joined the Episcopal Church, which still retains much of the Catholic liturgical form. Some have converted to evangelical churches. Fiorello La Guardia was raised Episcopalian; his father was Catholic, and his mother was from the small but significant community of Italian Jews. There is a small charismatic denomination, known as the Christian Church of North America, which is rooted in the Italian Pentecostal Movement that originated in Chicago in the early 20th century. A group of Italian immigrants in Trenton, New Jersey, and Wakefield, Massachusetts, built their own small Baptist chapel and converted to the Baptist denomination. The Church of Jesus Christ (Bickertonite), a denomination of the Latter Day Saint movement, which is headquartered in Monongahela, Pennsylvania, counts significant numbers of Italian Americans in its leadership and membership. The town of Valdese, North Carolina, was founded in 1893 by a group of Italians of Waldensian religion, originally from the Cottian Alps in Italy.

==== Italian Jews ====
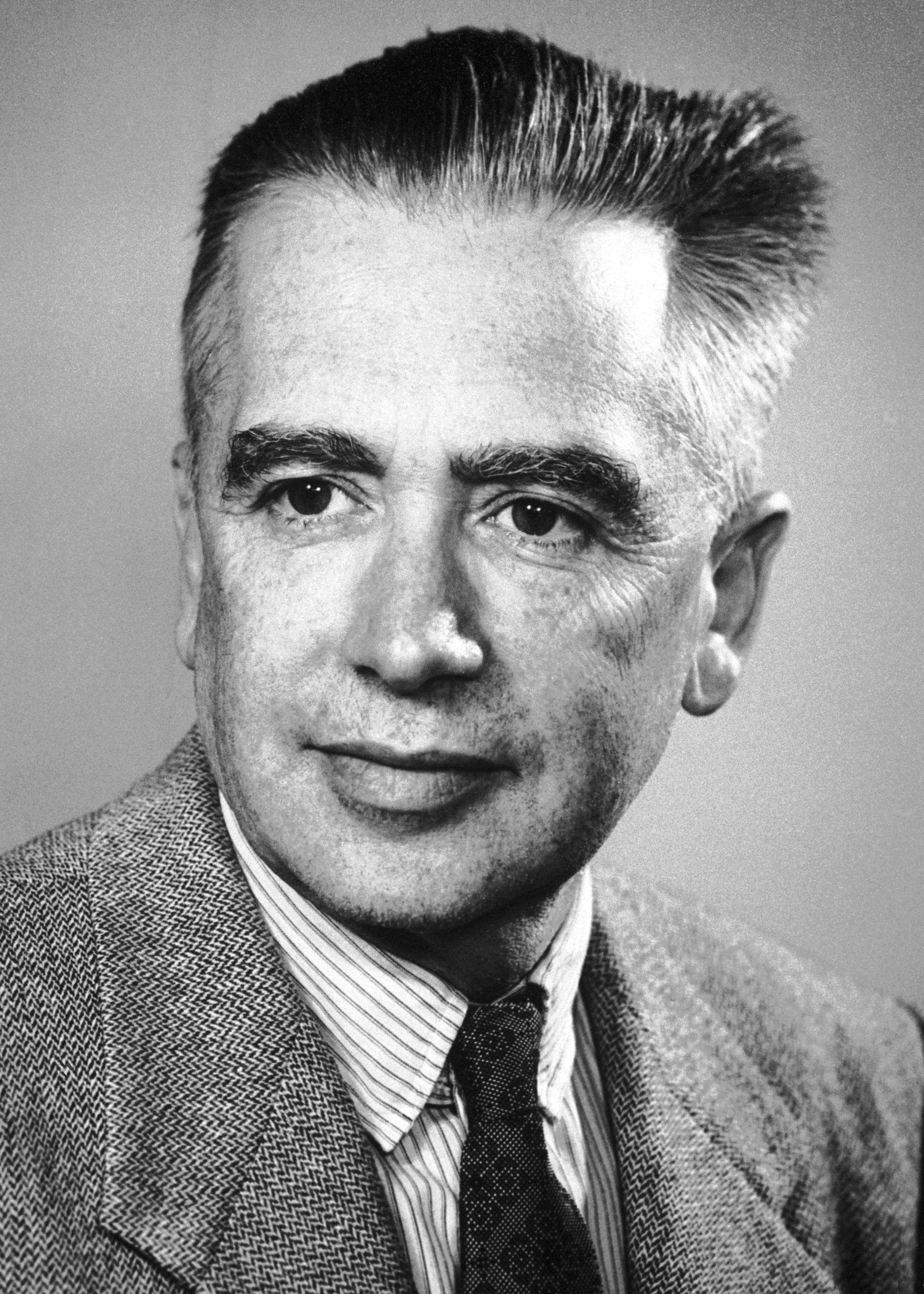
Emilio Segrè, who was awarded the Nobel Prize in Physics in 1959, was among the Italian Jews who emigrated to the United States after Mussolini's regime implemented an anti-semitic legislation.

The Jewish emigration from Italy was never at a level that resulted in the formation of Italian Jewish communities in the United States. Religious Italian Jews integrated into existing Jewish communities without difficulty, especially in Sephardic communities, and those who were secular found Jewish secular institutions in the United States ready to welcome them. Despite their small numbers, Italian American Jews have had a great influence on American life, starting with Lorenzo Da Ponte (born Emanuele Conegliano), Mozart's former librettist, opera impresario and the first professor of Italian at Columbia College in New York, where he lived from 1805 to his death in 1838.

From a religious point of view, the figure of greatest influence is Rabbi Sabato Morais, who, at the end of the 19th century, was the leader of the large Sephardic community of Philadelphia. In 1886, he became one of the founders of the Jewish Theological Seminary of America in New York, where he became its first dean. Two other Italian Jews achieved prominence in the United States in the first half of the 20th century: Giorgio Polacco was the principal conductor of the Metropolitan Opera House (1915–1917) and the Chicago Civic Opera (1921–1930), and Fiorello La Guardia was a member of the U.S. Congress (1917–1919 and 1923–1933) and a popular mayor of New York (1934–1945). A descendant on his mother's side of the great Italian rabbi Samuel David Luzzatto, La Guardia could address his constituency in both Italian and Yiddish.

Under Mussolini's Racial Laws of 1938, Italian Jews, who had lived in Italy for over two millennia, were stripped of most of their civil liberties. Finding refuge in the United States as a result of the fascist persecutions during the 1930s and 1940s, roughly 2,000 Italian Jews landed in America and continued their work in a wide range of fields. Many achieved international importance, including Giorgio Levi Della Vida, Mario Castelnuovo-Tedesco, Vittorio Rieti, Bruno Rossi, Emilio Segre, Giorgio Cavaglieri, Ugo Fano, Robert Fano, Guido Fubini, Eugene Fubini, and Silvano Arieti. Of particular importance also are the contributions of the Italian Jewish women Maria Bianca Finzi-Contini, Bianca Ara Artom, and Giuliana Tesoro, who opened the fields of university and scientific research to Italian American women. After the war, four Italian American Jews received the Nobel Prize: Franco Modigliani, Emilio Segre, Salvador Luria, and Rita Levi Montalcini. Also of significance are the contributions of communication specialist Andrew Viterbi, journalist and writer Ken Auletta, and economist Guido Calabresi. The international recognition of the work of Primo Levi and other Italian-Jewish authors, such as Giorgio Bassani and Carlo Levi, has increased the interest in the United States in Italian Judaism, as demonstrated by the opening in 1998 of the Primo Levi Center of New York.

=== Feasts ===
An important event brought over from Italy by the early Italian immigrants is the festa. This was for many an important connection to the traditions of their ancestral villages in Italy. The festa involved an elaborate procession through the streets in honor of a patron saint or the Virgin Mary. The festa became an important occasion that helped give the immigrants a sense of unity and common identity. This tradition has continued into the modern day as well.

In some Sicilian American communities, primarily Buffalo and New Orleans, Saint Joseph's Day (March 19) is marked by parades and celebrations, including traditional "St. Joseph's tables," where meatless dishes are served for the benefit of the communities' poor. Columbus Day is also widely celebrated, as are the feasts of some regional Italian patron saints. In Boston's North End, the Italian immigrants celebrate the "Feast of all Feasts," Saint Anthony's Feast. Started in 1919 by Italian immigrants from Montefalcione, a small town near Naples, Italy, the feast is widely considered the largest and most authentic Italian religious festival in the United States. More than 100 vendors and 300,000 people attend the feast over a three-day period in August. San Gennaro (September 19) is another popular saint, especially among Neapolitans. Santa Rosalia (September 4), is celebrated by immigrants from Sicily. Immigrants from Potenza celebrate the San Rocco's Day (August 16) feast at the Potenza Lodge in Denver the third weekend of August. San Rocco is the patron saint of Potenza, as is San Gerardo. Many still celebrate the Christmas season with a Feast of the Seven Fishes. The Feast of the Assumption is celebrated in Cleveland's Little Italy on August 15. On this feast day, people will pin money on a Blessed Virgin Mary statue as a symbol of prosperity. The statue is then paraded through Little Italy to Holy Rosary Church.

=== Education ===
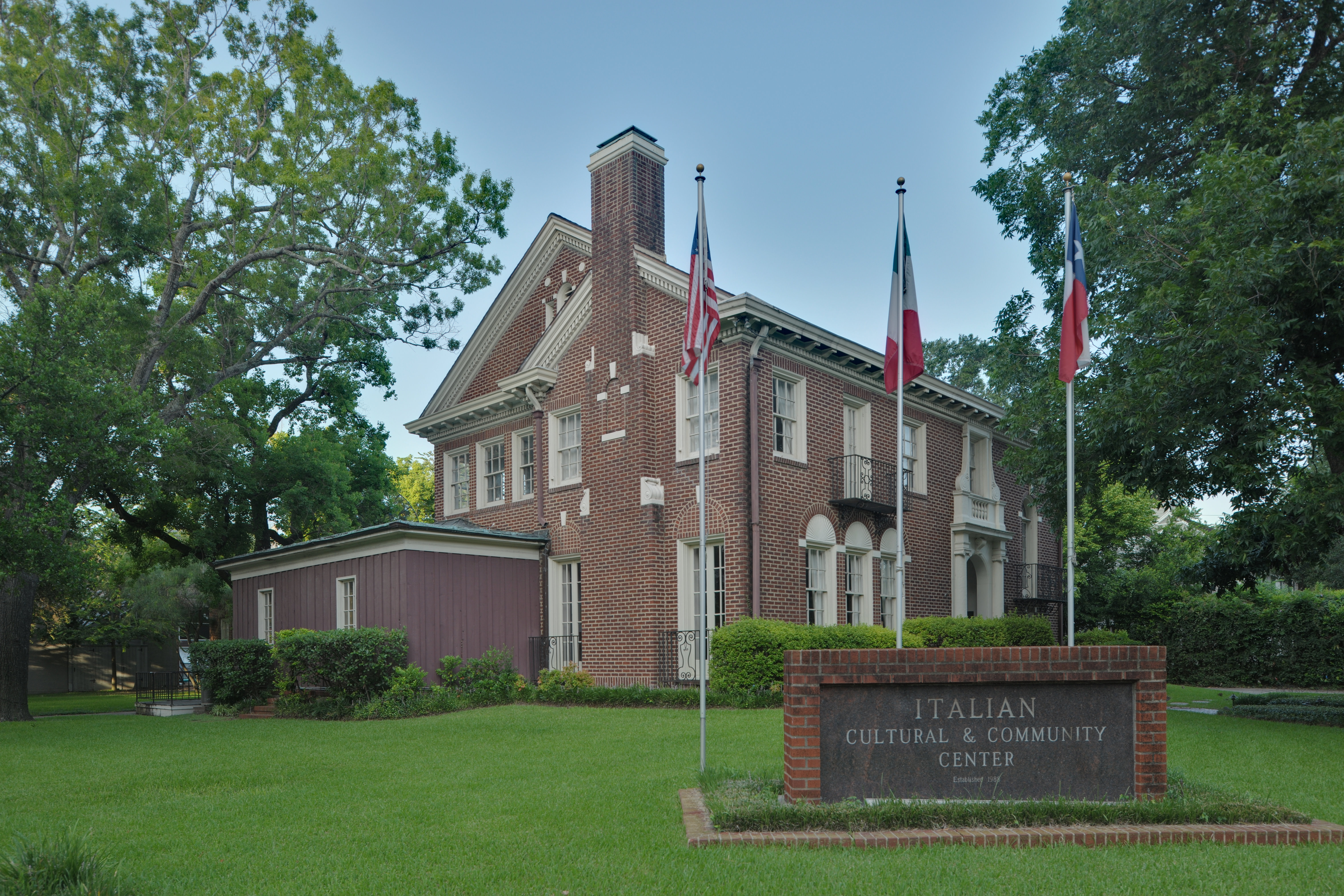
Italian Cultural and Community Center (Logue House) in the Houston Museum District

During the era of mass immigration, rural families in Italy did not place a high value on formal education since they needed their children to help with chores as soon as they were old enough. For many, this attitude did not change upon arriving in America, where children were expected to help support the family as soon as possible. This view toward education steadily changed with each successive generation. The 1970 census revealed that those under age 45 had achieved a level of education comparable to the national average, and within six decades of their peak immigration year, Italian Americans as a whole had equaled the national average in educational attainment. Presently, according to Census Bureau data, Italian Americans have an average high school graduation rate, and a higher rate of advanced degrees compared to the national average. Italian Americans throughout the United States are well represented in a wide variety of occupations and professions, from skilled trades, to the arts, to engineering, science, mathematics, law, and medicine, and include a number of Nobel prize winners.

There are two Italian international schools in the United States, La Scuola International in San Francisco, and La Scuola d'Italia Guglielmo Marconi in New York City.

=== Media ===
==== Television personalities ====
Numerous American television and Cable personalities are of Italian descent. Talk-show hosts include Jay Leno, Jimmy Kimmel, Kelly Ripa, Dana Perino, Maria Bartiromo, Jim Sciutto, Adam Carolla, Neil Cavuto, Kelly Monaco, Jai Rodriguez, Annette Funicello, Victoria Gotti, Tony Danza, Giuliana Rancic, Bruno Cipriani.

==== Italian American newspapers ====
Generoso Pope (1891–1950), the owner of a chain of Italian language newspapers in major cities, stands out as the epitome of the Italian American ethnic political broker. He bought Il Progresso Italo-Americano in 1928 for $2 million; he doubled its circulation to 200,000 in New York City, making it the largest Italian-language paper in the country. He purchased additional papers in New York and Philadelphia, which became the chief source of political, social, and cultural information for the community. Pope encouraged his readers to learn English, become citizens, and vote; his goal was to instill pride and ambition to succeed in modern America. A conservative Democrat who ran the Columbus Day parade and admired Mussolini, Pope was the most powerful enemy of anti-Fascism among Italian Americans. Closely associated with Tammany Hall politics in New York, Pope and his newspapers played a vital role in securing the Italian vote for Franklin D. Roosevelt's Democratic tickets. He served as chairman of the Italian Division of the Democratic National Committee in 1936, and helped persuade the president to take a neutral attitude over Italy's invasion of Ethiopia. He broke with Mussolini in 1941 and enthusiastically supported the American war effort. In the late 1940s Pope supported the election of William O'Dwyer as mayor in 1945 and Harry S. Truman as president. His business concerns continued to prosper under New York's Democratic administrations, and in 1946 he added the Italian-language radio station WHOM to his media holdings. In the early years of the Cold War, Pope was a leading anti-Communist and orchestrated a letter-writing campaign by his subscribers to stop the Communists from winning the Italian elections in 1948.

Voters did not always vote the way editorials dictated, but they depended on the news coverage. At many smaller papers, support for Mussolini, short-sighted opportunism, deference to political patrons who were not members of the Italian-American communities, and the necessity of making a living through periodicals with a small circulation, generally weakened the owners of Italian-language newspapers when they tried to become political brokers of the Italian American vote.

James V. Donnaruma purchased Boston's La Gazzetta del Massachusetts in 1905. La Gazzetta enjoyed a wide readership in Boston's Italian community because it emphasized detailed coverage of local ethnic events and explained how events in Europe affected the community. Donnaruma's editorial positions, however, were frequently at odds with the sentiments of his readership. Donnaruma's conservative views and desire for greater advertising revenue prompted him to court the favor of Boston's Republican elite, to whom he pledged editorial support in return for the purchase of advertising space for political campaigns. La Gazzetta consistently supported Republican candidates and policy positions, even when the party was proposing and passing laws to restrict Italian immigration. Nevertheless, voting records from the 1920s–1930s show that Boston's Italian Americans voted heavily for Democratic candidates.

Carmelo Zito took over the San Francisco newspaper Il Corriere del Popolo in 1935. Under Zito, it became one of the fiercest foes of Mussolini's fascism on the West Coast. It vigorously attacked Italy's 1935 invasion of Ethiopia and its intervention in the Spanish Civil War. Zito helped form the Italian-American Anti-Fascist League and often attacked certain Italian prominenti like Ettore Patrizi, publisher of L'Italia and La Voce del Popolo. Zito's paper campaigned against alleged Italian pro-Fascist language schools of San Francisco.

In 1909, Vincenzo Giuliano, an immigrant from Calabria, Italy and his wife Maria Oliva founded La Tribune Italiana d'America, known today as The Italian Tribune, which circulates throughout southeastern Michigan. A second newspaper founded by a Catholic order of priests, La Voce del Popolo also served the Metro Detroit community until the 1920s, when that newspaper merged with La Tribuna Italiana d'America. Upon Giuliano's death in the 1960s, his family continued the paper.

=== Organizations ===
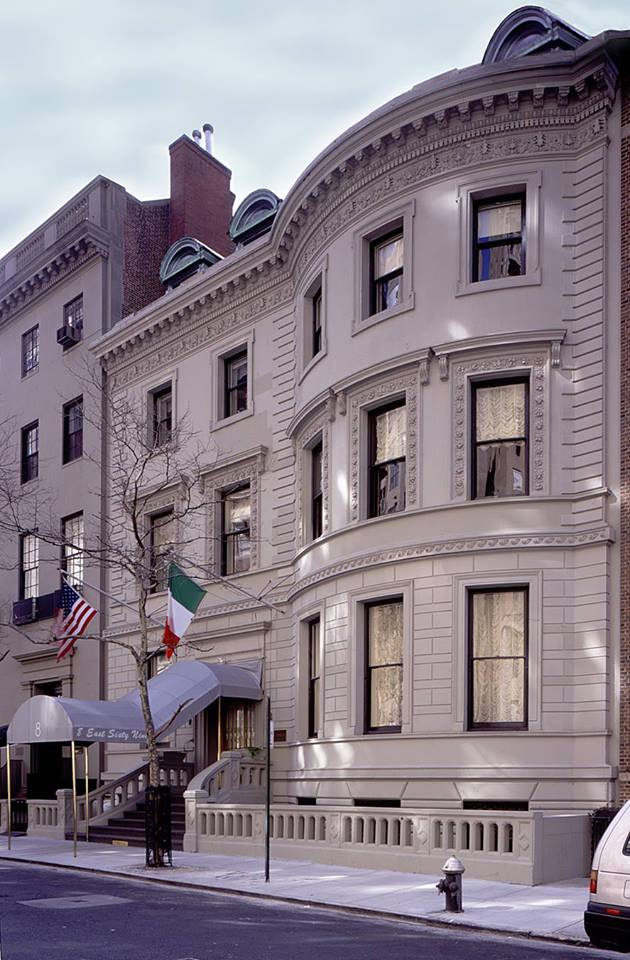
Columbus Citizens Foundation

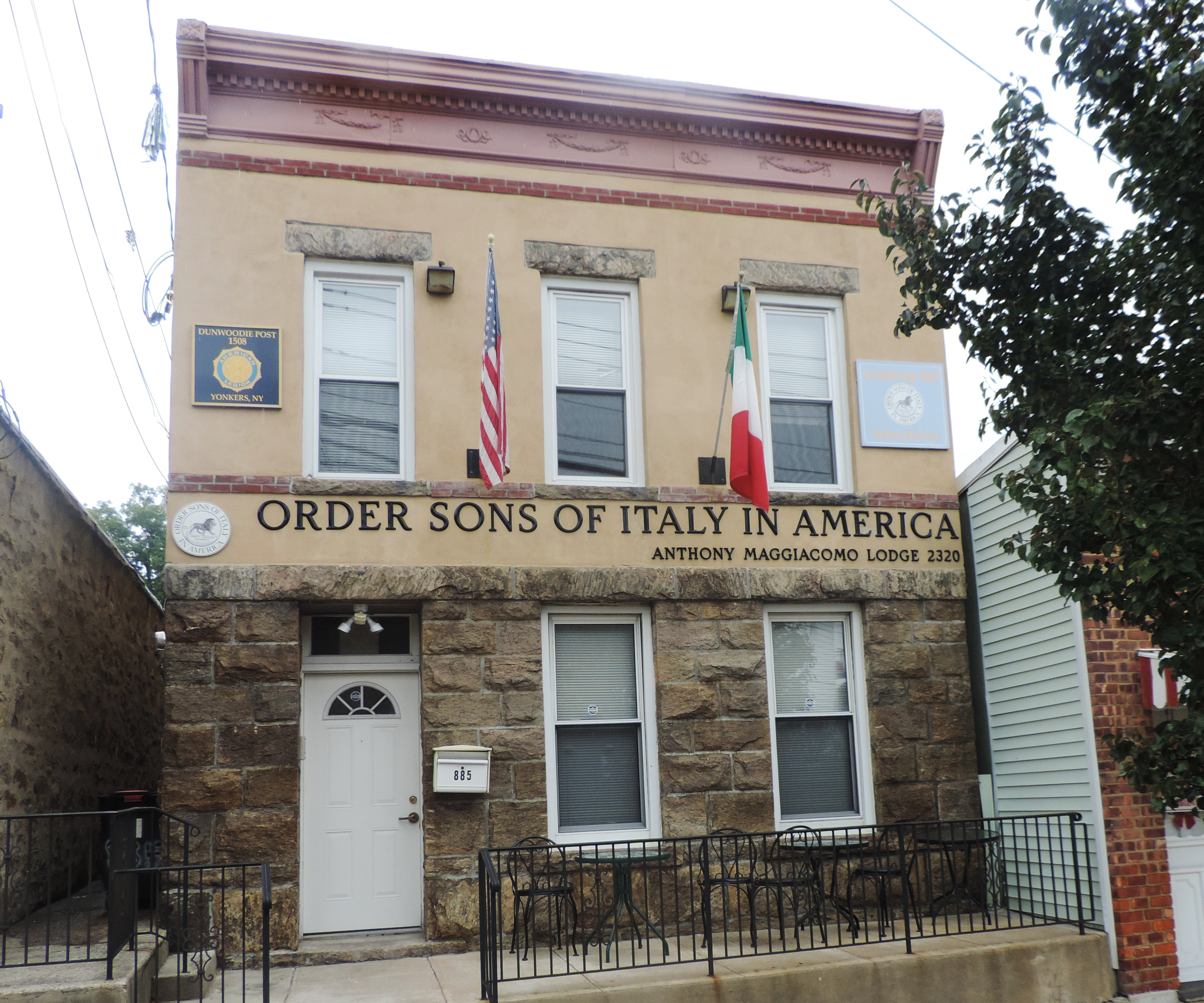
One of the 2,800 lodges of the Order Sons of Italy in America (this in Yonkers, New York)

Italian-American organizations include:

- Alpha Phi Delta
- American Italian Anti-Defamation League
- Columbus Citizens Foundation
- Italian American Congressional Delegation
- Italian American One Voice Coalition
- Italian-American Civil Rights League
- Italian-American National Union
- Italy–USA Foundation
- National Organization of Italian American Women
- Order Sons of Italy in America
- Unico National
- The Columbian Foundation
- American Relief for Italy, Inc (ARI)

In 1944, the creation of the American Relief for Italy, Inc (ARI) functioned as an umbrella organization until 1946. The ARI collected, shipped, and distributed over $10 million of relief materials donated by other Italian organizations and individuals from all over Italy. Catholic charities, labor unions, cultural clubs, and fraternal organizations all responded in helping to raise money for the ARI. These relief materials were donated to Italians in need and helped to provide humanitarian assistance. All remaining donations were distributed to Italian soldiers at war. This organization was one of the first steps in the lengthy process of political and economic stabilizations in postwar Italy.

- American Committee on Italian Migration (ACIM)

Throughout the 1950s and the 1960s, the American Committee on Italian Migration (ACIM) was one of the largest, most active Italian American organizations in the United States. They gave assistance to Italian immigrants living in the United States threatened by political instability and provided recovery for those in need. Frequently, money and supplies were sent back home to those who were unable to migrate or were in the process of migrating to the United States. Most of these people were the women and children Italian men left behind in hopes of starting a new life in America. The ACIM grew rapidly with hundreds of thousands of members being both donors and beneficiaries.

- National Catholic Welfare Conference (NCWC)

The National Catholic Welfare Conference (NCWC) worked with ACIM on legislative campaigns and immigration projects. In 1951, members from NCWC, ACIM, as well as other Italian Americans joined in efforts to create an organization that specifically benefited and focused on assisting Italian immigrants. After a vast effort in 1953, the Refugee Relief Act (RRA) was passed allowing the entrance of over two hundred thousand Italian immigrants into the United States. The RRA provided these Italian immigrants with many opportunities to start their new life in America. Job opportunities, a place to live, and proper education for immigrants children were provided.

The National Italian American Foundation (NIAF) – a nonpartisan, nonprofit organization headquartered in Washington, D.C. – works to represent Italian Americans, spread knowledge of the Italian language, foster U.S./Italy relations and connect the greater Italian American community. Additionally, two major Italian American fraternal and service organizations, Order Sons of Italy in America and Unico National, actively promote knowledge of Italian American history and culture.

The Italian Heritage and Culture Committee – NY, Inc. was founded in 1976, and has organized special events, concerts, exhibits and lectures celebrating Italian culture in New York City. Each year it focuses on a theme representative of the history and culture of Italy and Italian Americans.

The Italic Institute of America is dedicated to fostering and preserving knowledge of the classical Italian heritage of American society, through the Latin language and Greco-Roman-Etruscan civilization, as well as five centuries of contributions to American society by Italians and their descendants.

== Culture ==
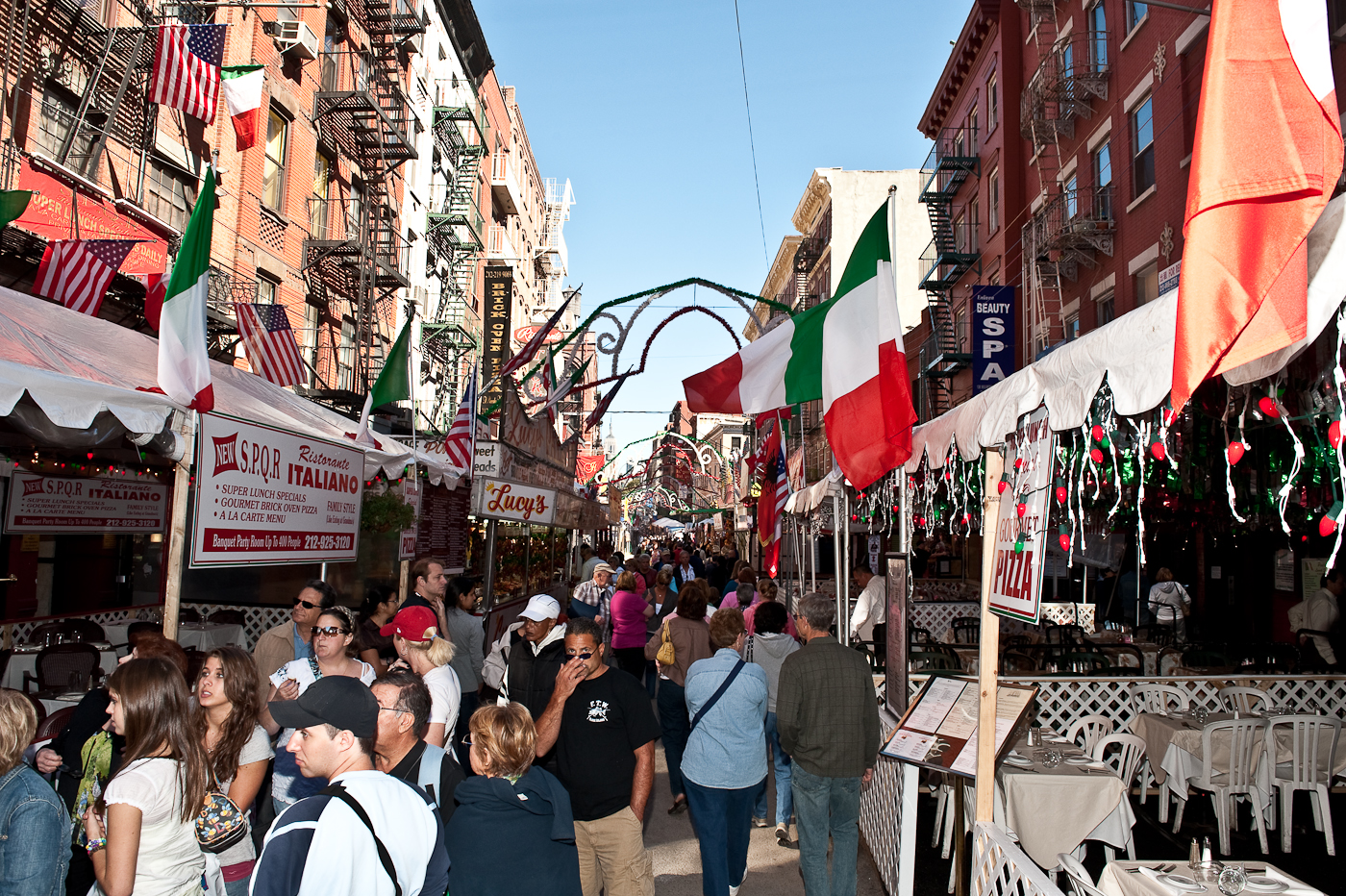
Feast of San Gennaro in New York City, 2009

Italian Americans have influenced the American culture and society in a variety of ways, such as foods, coffees, and desserts; wine production (in California and elsewhere in the United States); popular music, starting in the 1940s and 1950s and continuing into the present; operatic, classical, and instrumental music; jazz; fashion and design; cinema, literature, and Italianate architecture, in homes, churches, and public buildings; Montessori schools; Christmas crèches; fireworks displays; and sports (e.g., bocce and beach tennis).

Italian Americans are citizens of the United States who possess full or partial Italian ancestry, representing approximately five percent of the total U.S. Population. While Italian explorers and early settlers were present in North America as early as the 17th century, the most significant migration occurred between 1880 and 1914, when millions arrived, primarily from southern Italy, to seek employment and escape economic hardship. Many of these early arrivals, often referred to as "birds of passage," initially intended to work temporarily before returning to their homeland, though a large percentage ultimately established permanent roots, concentrating in major urban areas across the Northeast and industrial Midwest. Later generations arrived in smaller numbers, often from Northern Italy, and took up academic, professional, and skilled labor jobs instead.

Over generations, this community has profoundly shaped the fabric of American society, contributing extensively to the nation’s politics, visual arts, literature, cuisine, music, scholarship, and science. Beyond these institutional contributions, the Italian-American experience has been defined by the development of unique cultural traditions, local community structures, and a distinct linguistic heritage that blends ancestral roots with American life.

== Discrimination and stereotyping ==
During the period of mass immigration to the United States, Italians were often victims of prejudice, economic exploitation, and sometimes even violence, particularly in the South. In the 1890s, more than 20 Italians were lynched. The hostility was often directed toward the Southern Italians and Sicilians who began immigrating to the United States in large numbers after 1880.

There was xenophobic attitude at the time defining the idea of "whiteness" in the United States, and a social hierarchy within the various white American communities in which a different degrees of whiteness was associated with each group. Some European immigrants, such as Italians, were considered less white than the early European settlers and, therefore, were less accepted at that time in American society.

Italian stereotypes abounded as a means of justifying the maltreatment of the immigrants. The print media greatly contributed to the stereotyping of Italians with lurid accounts of secret societies and criminality. Between 1890 and 1920, Italian neighborhoods were often depicted as violent and controlled by criminal networks. Two highly publicized cases illustrate the impact of these negative stereotypes:

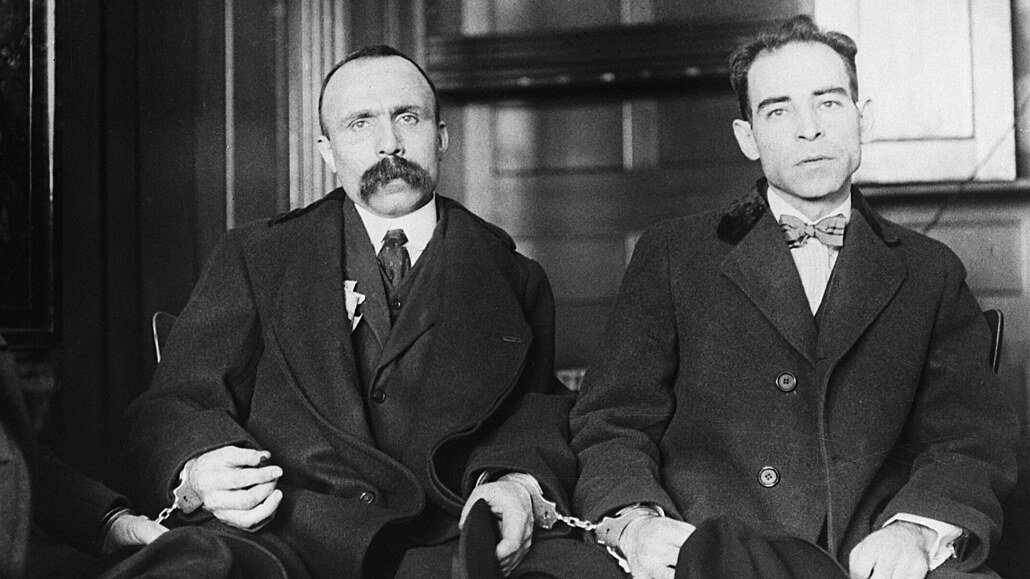
Sacco and Vanzetti in handcuffs

In 1891, eleven Italian immigrants in New Orleans were lynched due to their alleged role in the murder of the police chief David Hennessy. This was one of the largest mass lynchings in U.S. history. The lynching took place after nine of the immigrants were tried for the murder and acquitted. Subsequently, a mob broke into the jail where they were being held and dragged them out to be lynched, together with two other Italians who were being held in the jail at the time, but had not been accused in the killing.

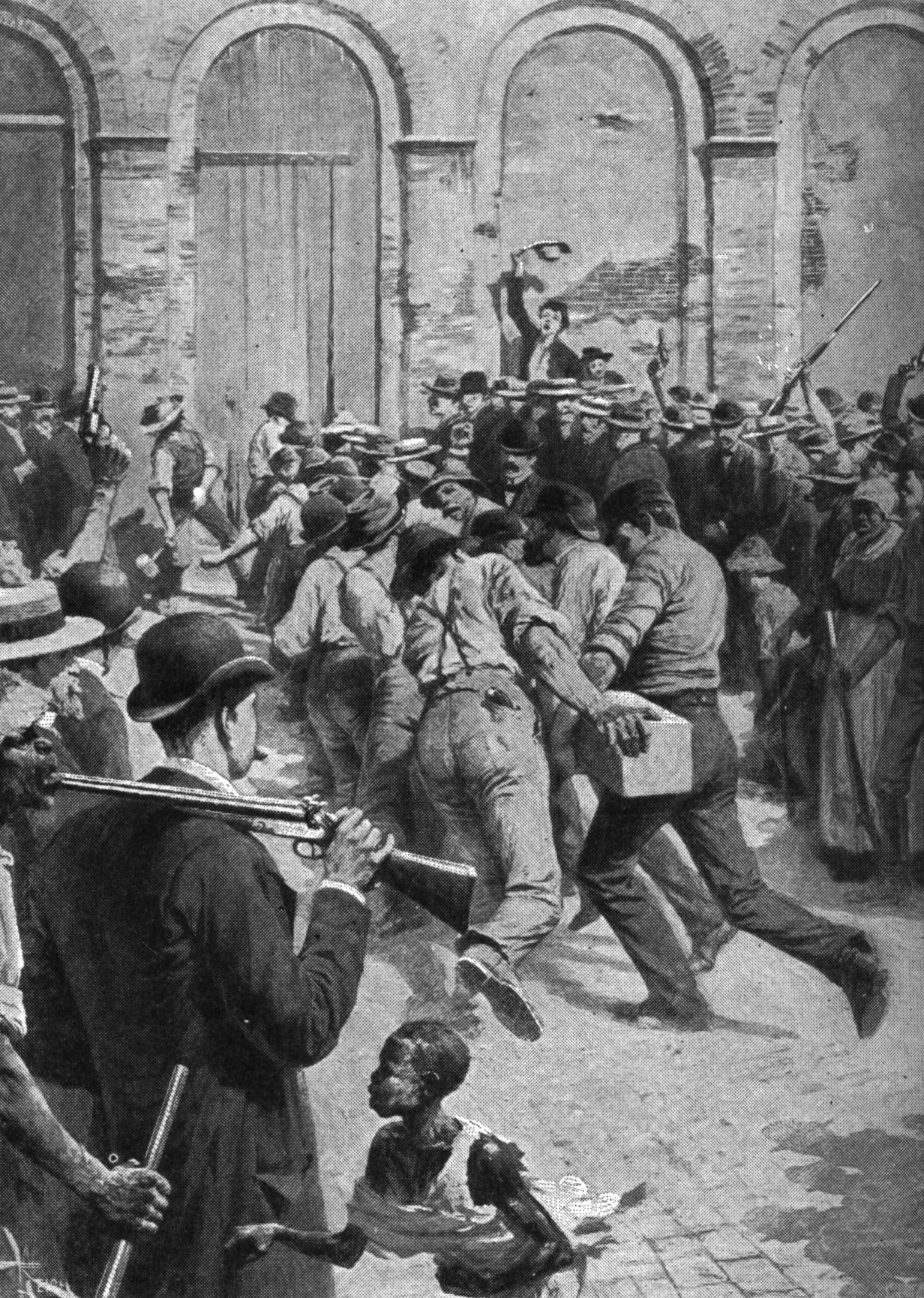
One of the largest mass lynchings in American history involved eleven Italian immigrants in New Orleans in 1891.

In 1920, two Italian immigrants, Nicola Sacco and Bartolomeo Vanzetti, were accused of robbery and murder in Braintree, Massachusetts. Many historians agree that they were given a very unfair and biased trial because of their anarchistic political beliefs and their Italian immigrant status. In spite of worldwide protests, Sacco and Vanzetti were eventually executed in 1927.

The first woman to ever be sentenced to death in the electric chair, Maria Barbella, was Italian American; newspapers published inflammatory coverage calling her physical features "degenerate." Italian American scholars later attributed her death sentence to the proliferation of anti-Italian sentiments in the media and the lack of Italians on Barbella's jury. Her death sentence was later overturned, and she was released from prison entirely in 1896. The warden of Sing Sing Prison in Ossining, New York, from 1920 to 1941, Lewis E. Lawes, opposed the death penalty; in 1923, he noted in one of his abolitionist speeches that Italian Americans were disproportionately subjected to the death penalty in New York. He stated that out of 347 individuals he saw entering death row at Sing Sing, 100 of them were of Italian descent despite Italy itself having a low murder rate and despite Italy having abolished capital punishment at the time of his speech.

While the vast majority of Italian immigrants brought with them a tradition of hard work and were law-abiding citizens, as documented by police statistics of the early 20th century in Boston and New York City which show that Italian immigrants had an arrest rate no greater than that of other major immigrant groups, a very small minority brought a very different custom. This criminal element preyed on the immigrants of the Little Italies, using intimidation and threats to extract protection money from the wealthier immigrants and shop owners, and were also involved in a multitude of other illegal activities. When the fascists came to power in Italy, they made the destruction of the Mafia in Sicily a high priority. Hundreds fled to the United States in the 1920s and 1930s to avoid prosecution.

Prohibition, which went into effect in 1920, proved to be an economic windfall for those in the Italian American community already involved in illegal activities, and those who had fled from Sicily. This entailed smuggling liquor into the country, wholesaling it, and then selling it through a network of outlets. While other ethnic groups were also deeply involved in these illegal ventures, and the associated violence, Chicago mobster Al Capone became the most notorious figure of the Prohibition era. Though eventually repealed, Prohibition had a long-term effect as the spawning ground for later criminal activities.

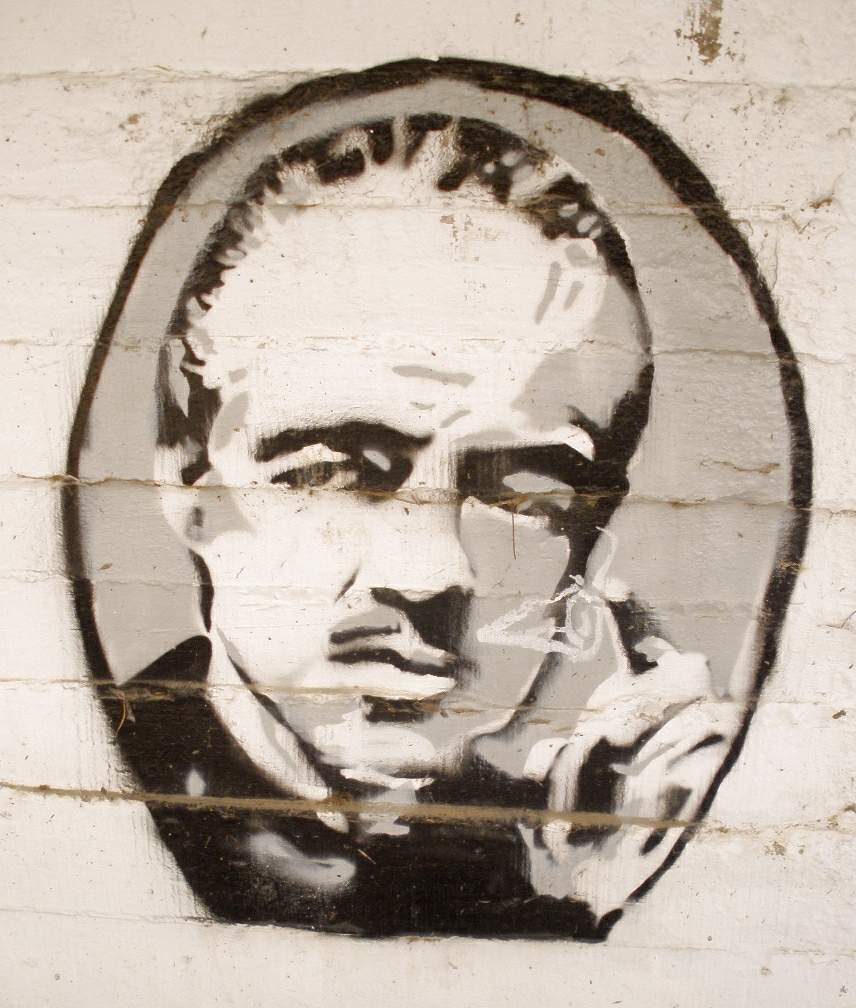
Media portrayal of mobsters, such as the fictional Don Corleone, has been a major factor in shaping Italian American ethnic stereotypes.

In the 1950s, the scope of Italian American organized crime became well known though a number of highly publicized congressional hearings that followed a police raid on a top-level meeting of racketeers in Apalachin, New York. With advanced surveillance techniques, the Witness Protection Program, the Racketeer Influenced & Corrupt Organizations Act, and vigorous and sustained prosecution the power and influence of organized crime were greatly diminished in the decades that followed. Two Italian American prosecutors, Rudy Giuliani and Louis Freeh, were instrumental in bringing this about. Freeh was later appointed director of the FBI, while Giuliani would serve two terms as Mayor of New York City.

From the earliest days of the movie industry, Italians have been portrayed as violent criminals and sociopaths. This trend has continued to the present day. The stereotype of Italian Americans is the standardized mental image which has been fostered by the entertainment industry, especially through commercially successful movies like The Godfather, Goodfellas, and Casino; and TV programs such as The Sopranos. This follows a known pattern in which it is possible for the mass media to effectively create universally recognized, and sometimes accepted, stereotypes.

A highly publicized protest from the Italian-American community came in 2001 when the Chicago-based organization AIDA (American Italian Defamation Association) unsuccessfully sued Time Warner for distribution of HBO's series The Sopranos.

The DreamWorks animated film Shark Tale was widely protested by virtually all major Italian-American organizations as introducing the mob genre and negative stereotyping into a children's movie. In spite of the protests, which started during its early production, the movie was produced and released in 2004.

In 2009, MTV launched a reality show, Jersey Shore, which prompted severe criticism from Italian American organizations such as the National Italian American Foundation, Order Sons of Italy in America, and Unico National for its stereotypical portrayal of Italian Americans.

The effective stereotyping of Italian Americans as being associated with organized crime was shown by a comprehensive study of Italian American culture on film, conducted from 1996 to 2001 by the Italic Institute of America. The findings showed that over two-thirds of the more than 2,000 films studied portray Italian Americans in a negative light. Further, close to 300 movies featuring Italian Americans as criminals have been produced since The Godfather, an average of nine per year. According to the Italic Institute of America:

The mass media has consistently ignored five centuries of Italian American history, and has elevated what was never more than a minute subculture to the dominant Italian American culture.

In actuality, according to recent FBI statistics, Italian American organized crime members and associates number approximately 3,000; and, given an Italian American population estimated to be approximately 18 million, the study concludes that only one in 6,000 is active in organized crime (0.007% of Italian-Americans).

== Communities ==
Little Italies were, to a considerable extent, the result of Italophobia. The ethnocentrism and anti-Catholicism exhibited by the earlier Anglo-Saxon and northern European settlers helped to create an ideological foundation for fixing foreignness on urban spaces occupied by immigrants. Communities of Italian Americans were established in most major industrial cities of the early 20th century. New Orleans, Louisiana was the first site of immigration of Italians into America in the 19th century, before Italy was a unified nation-state. This was before New York Harbor and Baltimore became the preferred destinations for Italian immigrants. In sharp contrast to the Northeast, most of the Southern states (with the exception of Central and South Florida and the New Orleans area) have relatively few Italian-American residents. During the labor shortage in the 19th and early 20th centuries, planters in the Deep South did attract some Italian immigrants to work as sharecroppers, but they soon left the extreme anti-Italian discrimination and strict regimen of the rural areas for the cities or other states. The state of California has had Italian-American residents since the 1850s. By the 1970s, gentrification of inner city neighborhoods and the arrival of new immigrant groups caused a sharp decline in the old Italian-American and other ethnic enclaves. Many Italian Americans moved to the rapidly growing Western states. Today, New York and New Jersey have the largest numbers of Italian Americans in the U.S. while smaller Northeastern cities such as Pittsburgh, Providence and Hartford have the highest percentage of Italian Americans in their metropolitan areas.

Italian-American communities have historically been concentrated in the industrial centers of the Northeast and Midwest, where early 20th-century immigrants settled in specific urban enclaves. These neighborhoods, often referred to as "Little Italies," served as essential hubs for new arrivals, providing shared social, cultural, and economic support systems. Major cities such as New York, Philadelphia, Boston, and Chicago became home to dense, vibrant clusters, while other communities emerged in industrial towns across states like Connecticut, New Jersey, and Pennsylvania to support the nation’s mining, manufacturing, and railroad sectors.

While the highest percentages of Italian-American residents remain in the Northeast, these communities have established a presence in nearly every region of the United States. Over time, these enclaves have evolved from immigrant portals into neighborhoods that reflect a blend of heritage and contemporary American life. Today, while many traditional enclaves have transitioned or integrated further into the broader population, they continue to be recognized as significant cultural markers, celebrated for their contributions to American food, civic engagement, and local history.

== Demographics ==
Americans with Italian ancestry by state according to the U.S. Census Bureau's American Community Survey in 2019

In the 2000 U.S. census, Italian Americans constituted the fifth largest ancestry group in America with about 15.6 million people, 5.6% of the total U.S. population. As of 2006, the U.S. census estimated the Italian American population at 17.8 million persons, or 6% of the population, constituting a 14% increase over the six-year period.

In 2010, the American Community Survey enumerated Americans reporting Italian ancestry at nearly 17.6 million, 5.8% of the U.S. population; in 2015, 17.3 million, 5.5% of the population. A decade thereafter, in 2020, the U.S. Census Bureau recorded slightly more than 16.5 million Americans reporting full or partial Italian ancestry, about 5.1% of the U.S. population. As ancestry is self-reported, the decline in Italian identification in the 21st century may merely reflect growing Americanization and cultural assimilation of Italian Americans into the broader identity of White Americans, with younger generations increasingly intermixed with other European Americans: the number of Americans who reported being solely of Italian ancestry alone fell by 928,044—from 7,183,882 in 2010 to 6,652,806 in 2015 to 5,724,762 in 2020. However, by contrast, the number of Americans who reported being of Italian ancestry mixed with another ancestry grew by 436,334—from 10,387,926 in 2010 to 10,632,691 in 2015 to 10,824,260 in 2020.

U.S. states number and percentage Italian American in 2020

(Italy) Estimated Italian American population by state (United States)
State	Number	Percentage
Alabama	78,547	1.61%
Alaska	20,629	2.80%
Arizona	297,383	4.15%
Arkansas	44,534	1.48%
California	1,414,190	3.59%
Colorado	275,803	4.85%
Connecticut	590,721	16.54%
Delaware	81,036	8.37%
District of Columbia	27,731	3.95%
Florida	1,222,217	5.76%
Georgia	234,113	2.23%
Hawaii	30,019	2.11%
Idaho	54,112	3.08%
Illinois	726,216	5.71%
Indiana	180,628	2.70%
Iowa	63,176	2.01%
Kansas	62,266	2.14%
Kentucky	90,775	2.03%
Louisiana	200,407	4.30%
Maine	76,133	5.68%
Maryland	291,816	4.83%
Massachusetts	825,642	12.01%
Michigan	452,303	4.53%
Minnesota	124,817	2.23%
Mississippi	53,122	1.78%
Missouri	204,254	3.34%
Montana	38,075	3.59%
Nebraska	49,349	2.57%
Nevada	158,170	5.22%
New Hampshire	137,322	10.13%
New Jersey	1,353,075	15.23%
New Mexico	46,352	2.21%
New York	2,320,549	11.89%
North Carolina	334,430	3.20%
North Dakota	8,767	1.15%
Ohio	715,494	6.13%
Oklahoma	69,023	1.75%
Oregon	154,010	3.69%
Pennsylvania	1,430,006	11.18%
Rhode Island	172,852	16.34%
South Carolina	153,895	3.02%
South Dakota	10,732	1.22%
Tennessee	152,739	2.26%
Texas	523,680	1.83%
Utah	86,754	2.75%
Vermont	45,447	7.28%
Virginia	332,213	3.90%
Washington	255,671	3.40%
West Virginia	77,548	4.29%
Wisconsin	200,205	3.45%
Wyoming	18,338	3.15%
United States	16,549,022	5.07%

=== U.S. communities with the most residents of Italian ancestry ===
The top 20 U.S. communities with the highest percentage of people claiming Italian ancestry are:

1. Fairfield, New Jersey 50.3%
2. Johnston, Rhode Island 49.5%
3. North Branford, Connecticut 43.9%
4. East Haven, Connecticut 43.6%
5. Hammonton, New Jersey 43.2%
6. Ocean Gate, New Jersey 42.6%
7. East Hanover, New Jersey 41.3%
8. North Haven, Connecticut 41.2%
9. Cedar Grove, New Jersey 40.8%
10. Wood-Ridge, New Jersey 40.6%
11. North Providence, Rhode Island 38.9%
12. Dunmore, Pennsylvania 38.9%
13. Newfield, New Jersey 38.8%
14. Saugus, Massachusetts 38.5%
15. Jenkins, Pennsylvania 38.4%
16. West Pittston, Pennsylvania 37.9%
17. Old Forge, Pennsylvania 37.8%
18. Lowellville, Ohio 37.5%
19. Hughestown, Pennsylvania 37.5%
20. Prospect, Connecticut 37.5%

=== U.S. places named for Italian Americans ===
- Busti, New York (Town and village name)

=== Socioeconomic Status/Demographics ===
In 2023, Italian Americans had a Per Capita Income of $55,349, higher than $43,313 which is the Per Capita Income for the total population and higher than $50,675 for all white Americans.

In terms of education, Italian Americans are significantly more educated than the Total Population. 96.2% have attained a high school diploma and 46.1% have attained a bachelor's degree or higher.

67% of the population are in the labor force, with 52.1% working in management, business, science, and arts occupations, but the community also has a large population working in sales and office occupations. In terms of industry, a large number of Italian Americans work in Educational services, and health care and social assistance as well as Professional, scientific, and management, and administrative and waste management services and Retail trade.

== See also ==
- Sicilian Americans
- List of Italian-American neighborhoods
  - Little Italies in the United States
  - History of Italians in Baltimore
  - History of Italian Americans in Boston
  - History of Italian Americans in Metro Detroit
  - History of Italians in Mississippi
  - Italians in New Orleans
  - Italians in New York City
  - History of Italian Americans in Philadelphia
  - Utah Italians
  - Tontitown, Arkansas
  - Valdese, North Carolina
- List of Italian-American actors
- List of Italian Americans in sports
- Order Sons of Italy in America
- Italian-American cuisine
- American Mafia
  - Italian-American Civil Rights League
- Italy–USA Foundation, based in Rome
- Italy–United States relations,
- Italian diaspora, worldwide
  - Anti-Italianism, worldwide
  - Italophilia

== Bibliography ==
- Alba, Richard D. Italian Americans: Into the twilight of ethnicity (Prentice Hall, 1985) online
- Bona, Mary Jo. Claiming a Tradition: Italian American Women Writers (1999)
- Bonomo Albright, Carol and Christine Palamidessi Moore, ed. American Woman, Italian Style (Fordham Press, 2011).
- Chiaricati, Federico. "Sons of our race! Help your motherland! Buy Italian! Italian propaganda through food ads among Italian American ethnic communities at the turn of the century." History of Retailing and Consumption 8.1 (2022): 49–68. online
- Connell, William J. and Fred Gardaphé, eds., Anti-Italianism: Essays on a Prejudice (2010)
- Connell, William J. and Stanislao Pugliese, eds., The Routledge History of Italian Americans (2018)
- Cordasco, Francesco. The Italians; social backgrounds of an American group (1974)online
- Cosco, Joseph P. Imagining Italians: The Clash of Romance and Race in American Perceptions, 1880-1910 (State University of New York Press, 2012) online.
- Krajewski, Andrew T., Daniel DellaPosta, and Diane Felmlee. "Vertical organizations, flat networks: Centrality and criminal collaboration in the Italian-American Mafia." Social Networks 68 (2022): 127–138.
- D'Acierno, Pellegrino A., ed. The Italian American Heritage: A Companion to Literature and Arts (Routledge, 2021) online.
- D'Agostino, Peter R. Rome in America: Transnational Catholic Ideology from the Risorgimento to Fascism (2004).
- Dainotto, Roberto M. The Mafia: A Cultural History (2015)
- De Ville, John. "Italians in the United States." The Catholic Encyclopedia (1910) vol 8 online
- Diggins, John P. Mussolini and Fascism: The View from America (1972)
- Dore, Grazia. "Some Social and Historical Aspects of Italian Emigration to America" Journal of Social History, 2#2 (1968), pp. 95–122 online
- Diner, Hasia R. Hungering for America: Italian, Irish, and Jewish Foodways in the Age of Migration (2001). 292 pp.
- Fasce, Ferdinando (2009). "Singing at Work: Italian Immigrants and Music during the Epoch of World War I". Italian Americana. 27: 133–48.
- Fox, Stephen, The unknown internment: an oral history of the relocation of Italian Americans during World War II, (1990).
- Gallo, Patrick. Old Bread, New Wine: A Portrait of the Italian-Americans (1981)
- Gans, Herbert J. Urban Villagers (1982), sociological study online
- Gems, Gerald R. Sport and the Shaping of Italian-American Identity. (Syracuse University Press, 2013) 312 pp.
- Giordano, Paolo A. and Anthony Julian Tamburri, eds. Italian Americans in the Third Millennium : Social Histories and Cultural Representations. New York: American Italian Historical Association, 2009.
- Giordano, Ralph G. "Italian Culture in America The Immigrants 1880 to 1930 From Discrimination to Assimilation" (Academica Press 2023).
- Giordano, Ralph G., "Italian Culture in America How a Founding Father Introduced Italian Art, Architecture, Food, Wine, and Liberty to the American People" (Academica 2020).
- Giovinazzo, William, Italianità: The Essence of Being Italian and Italian-American" Dark River, an imprint of Bennion Kearny, 2018. Italianità: The Essence of Being Italian and Italian-American | Book
- Glynn, Irial: Emigration Across the Atlantic: Irish, Italians and Swedes compared, 1800-1950 , European History Online, Mainz: Institute of European History, 2011, retrieved: June 16, 2011.
- Gardaphe, Fred L. Italian Signs, American Streets: The Evolution of Italian American Narrative (1996)
- Johnson, Colleen Leahy, and Colleen L. Johnson. Growing up and growing old in Italian-American families (Rutgers University Press, 1985)
- Lagumina, Salvatore J. et al. eds. The Italian American Experience: An Encyclopedia (2000) [
- Landry, Harral, ed. To See the Past More Clearly: The Enrichment of the Italian Heritage, 1890-1990 (1994) Austin: Nortex Press
- Leone, Cataldo. Italians in America (2001) Milanostampa, S.p.A.: Mockingbird Press
- Lombardo, Robert M. "Chicago's Little Sicily", Journal of the Illinois State Historical Society Volume: 100. Issue: 1. 2007.
- Luconi, Stefano. From Paesani to White Ethnics: The Italian Experience in Philadelphia (2001)
- Luconi, Stefano (2012). "Contested Loyalties: World War II and Italian Americans' Ethnic Identity". Italian Americana. 30: 151–67.
- Luconi, Stefano. "Food as a Terrain for Identity Construction and Ethnic Confrontation among Italian Americans in the United States." Journal of American Studies of Turkey 60 (2023): 17–42. online
- Maddalena, Marinari. Unwanted: Italian and Jewish Mobilization against Restrictive Immigration Laws, 1882–1965 (2020) excerpt
- Mangione, Jerre and Ben Morreale, La Storia: Five Centuries of the Italian American Experience. New York: Harper Perennial, 1992.
- Martone, Eric, ed. Italian Americans: the history and culture of a people (ABC-CLIO, 2016) online
- Nelli, Humbert S. From immigrants to ethnics : the Italian Americans (Oxford University Press, 1983) online
- Nelli, Humbert S. "Italians", in Stephan Thernstrom, ed. Harvard Encyclopedia of American Ethnic Groups. (Harvard University Press, 1980). ISBN 0-674-37512-2. pp 545–60.
- Nelli, Humbert S. The Business of Crime: Italians and Syndicate Crime in the United States (1981) online
- Nelli, Humbert S. "The Italian padrone system in the United States" Labor History (1964) 5:2, 153–167, DOI: 10.1080/00236566408583942
- Parati, Graziella, and Anthony Julian Tamburri, eds. The Cultures of Italian Migration: Diverse Trajectories and Discrete Perspectives. Cranberry, NJ: Fairleigh Dickinson University Press; 2011.
- Pecorini, Alberto (1909). "The Italian as an Agricultural Laborer". Annals of the American Academy of Political and Social Science. 33 (2): 156–166. doi:10.1177/000271620903300216. JSTOR 1011573. S2CID 151953455.
- Pozzetta, George. "Italian Americans." in Gale Encyclopedia of Multicultural America, edited by Thomas Riggs, (3rd ed., vol. 2, Gale, 2014), pp. 505–522. online
- Reppetto, Thomas A. American Mafia : a history of its rise to power (2004), scholarly history online
- Rolle, Andrew F. The immigrant upraised: Italian adventurers and colonists in an expanding America (Oklahoma UP, 1968)
- Rolle, Andrew. The Italian Americans (1980) psychohistory
- Ruberto, Laura E. and Joseph Sciorra, eds. New Italian Migrations to the United States: Vol. 1: Politics and History since 1945 (University of Illinois Press, 2017). xvi, 201 pp
- Seguin, Charles, and Sabrina Nardin. (2022) "The Lynching of Italians and the Rise of Antilynching Politics in the United States." Social Science History 46.1 (2022): 65–91. online
- Serra, Ilaria. The Imagined Immigrant: Images of Italian Emigration to the United States Between 1890 and 1924 (2009)
- Soresina, Marco. "Italian emigration policy during the Great Migration Age, 1888–1919: the interaction of emigration and foreign policy." Journal of Modern Italian Studies 21.5 (2016): 723–746.
- Sterba, Christopher M. Good Americans: Italian and Jewish Immigrants During the First World (2003)
- Thomas, Teresa Fava. "Arresting the Padroni problem and Rescuing the White Slaves in America: Italian Diplomats, Immigration Restrictionists & the Italian bureau 1881-1901." Altreitalia Riviste 192 Tesi 194 (2010) 40: 57–82. online
- Tommasi, L.F. (ed.), Italian Americans: New perspectives in Italian emigration and ethnicity (1985)
- Vecchio, Diane C. Merchants, Midwives, and Laboring Women: Italian Migrants in Urban America (2006).
- Vecoli, Rudolph J (1978). "The Coming of Age of Italian Americans: 1945–1974". Ethnicity. 5 (2): 119–147.

=== Localities ===
- Barton, Josef J. Peasants and Strangers: Italians, Rumanians, and Slovaks in an American City, 1890-1950 (1975). about Cleveland, Ohio online
- Briggs, John W. An Italian Passage: Immigrants to Three American Cities (Yale UP, 1978) on Utica NY, Rochester NY, and Kansas City, MO, 1890–1930. online
- Candeloro, Dominic. "Suburban Italians" in Melvin G. Holli and Peter Jones, eds. Ethnic Chicago (1984) pp 239–68 online
- Candeloro, Dominic. Chicago's Italians: Immigrants, Ethnics, Americans. (Arcadia Publishing, 2003).
- Cinel, Dino. From Italy to San Francisco: The Immigrant Experience (1982)
- Cinotto, Simone. The Italian American Table: Food, Family, and Community in New York City. (University of Illinois Press, 2013)
- Cinotto, Simone. Soft Soil, Black Grapes: The Birth of Italian Winemaking in California, (New York University Press, 2012)
- Critchley, David F. The origin of organized crime in America: The New York City Mafia, 1891–1931 (Routledge, 2008).
- DeBlasio, Donna M., and Martha I. Pallante. "Becoming Italian American in the Nation's Heartland: The Immigrant Experience in Ohio's Mahoning Valley." Italian Americana 40.2 (2022): 99–125.
- Delicato, Armando, Italians in Detroit. (2005).
- Demarco, William M. Ethnics and Enclaves: Boston's Italian North End (1981)
- Fichera, Sebastian. Italy on the Pacific: San Francisco's Italian Americans. New York: Palgrave Macmillan, 2012.
- Guglielmo, Thomas A. White on Arrival: Italians, Race, Color, and Power in Chicago, 1890-1945 (2003)
- Jackson, Jessica Barbata. "Before the Lynching: Reconsidering the Experience of Italians and Sicilians in Louisiana, 1870s-1890s". Louisiana History (2017). 58#3: 300–338. online
- Juliani, Richard N. The Social Organization of Immigration: The Italians in Philadelphia (1980) excerpt and text search
- Juliani, Richard N. Priest, Parish, and People: Saving the Faith in Philadelphia's Little Italy (2007)
- Lassonde, Stephen. "Learning and earning: Schooling, juvenile employment, and the early life course in late nineteenth-century New Haven." Journal of Social History (1996): 839–870. online
- Lassonde, Stephen. Learning to Forget: Schooling and Family Life in New Haven's Working Class, 1870-1940 (Yale UP 2005) a major scholarly study focused on Italian Americans
  - ProQuest Dissertations Publishing, 1994. 9523192; PhD dissertation version of Lassonde, online, 1994)
- Luconi, Stefano. The Italian-American Vote in Providence, R.I., 1916-1948 (2005)
- Luconi, Stefano. From paesani to white ethnics: The Italian experience in Philadelphia (SUNY Press, 2001) online.
- Kobler, John. Capone: the life and world of Al Capone (1971) online, on Chicago.
- Mormino, Gary. "The Immigrant World of Ybor City: Italians and Their Latin Neighbors in Tampa, 1885–1985". Gainesville: University Press of Florida. (1987)
- Nelli, Humbert S. Italians in Chicago, 1880–1930: A Study in Ethnic Mobility (2005) online
- Orsi, Robert A. The Madonna of 115th Street: Faith and Community in Italian Harlem, 1880–1950. (Yale UP, 1985) online 3rd ed. 2010
- Ottanelli, Fraser M. " 'Mussolini's Column': Fascist Memorials and the Politics of Italian American Identity in Chicago." Italian American Review 12.1 (2022): 86–107.
- Puleo, Stephen (2007). The Boston Italians: A Story of Pride, Perseverance, and Paesani, from the Years of the Great Immigration to the Present Day. Boston: Beacon Press. ISBN 978-0-8070-5036-1.
- Smith, Tom. "The Crescent City Lynchings: The Murder of Chief Hennessy, the New Orleans 'Mafia' Trials, and the Parish Prison Mob" (The Lyons Press, 2007). online
- Stanger-Ross, Jordan. Staying Italian: Urban Change and Ethnic Life in Postwar Toronto and Philadelphia (2010).
- Vecoli, Rudolph J. "The Formation of Chicago's" Little Italies"." Journal of American Ethnic History 2.2 (1983): 5-20. online
- Veronesi, Gene. Italian Americans and Their Communities of Cleveland (1977) Ohio city; online
- Whyte, William Foote. Street Corner Society: The Social Structure of an Italian Slum (University of

Chicago Press, 1943) focus on gangs in "Cornerville" (Boston's North End).

- Yans-McLaughlin, Virginia. Family and Community: Italian Immigrants in Buffalo, 1880–1930. (1982) online.

=== Memory and historiography ===
- Agnoletto, Stefano. "Ethnicity Versus Structural Factors in North American History: The Case Study of the Italian Economic Niches." Studia Migracyjne-Przeglad Polonijny 40.1 (151) (2014): 161–181. online
- Alba, Richard D. "The twilight of ethnicity among Americans of European ancestry: The case of Italians." in Celebrating 40 Years of Ethnic and Racial Studies (Routledge, 2019). 50–74. online
- Alba, Richard D. Italian Americans: Into the twilight of ethnicity (2023) online.
- Bushman, Claudia L. America discovers Columbus: how an Italian explorer became an American hero (1992) online
- Cannistraro, Philip, and Richard Juliani, ed. Italian-Americans: The Search for a Usable Past. (The American Italian Historical Association, 1989).
- Cordasco, Francesco. Italians in the United States : an annotated bibliography of doctoral dissertations completed at American universities, with a handlist of selected published bibliographies, related reference materials, and guide books for Italian emigrants (1981) online
- Cordasco, Francesco. Italian Americans : a guide to information sources (Gale 1978) online
- D'acierno, Pellegrino. "Cinema Paradiso: The Italian American Presence in American Cinema." in The Italian American Heritage (Routledge, 2021). 563–690. abstract
- Friedman-Kasaba, Kathie. Memories of migration: Gender, ethnicity, and work in the lives of Jewish and Italian women in New York, 1870-1924 (State University of New York Press, 2012).
- Gabaccia, Donna. "Italian American Women: A Review Essay," Italian Americana 12#1 (1993): 38–61.
- Gabaccia, Donna R. "Italian Immigrant Women in Comparative Perspective." The Review of Italian American Studies (2000): 391-405 online.
- Gardaphe, Fred. L. The Art of Reading Italian Americana, New York: Bordighera Press, 2011.
- Gardaphe, Fred L. Leaving Little Italy: Essaying Italian American Culture (SUNY Press, 2003).
- Giordano, Paolo A. and Anthony Julian Tamburri, eds. "Beyond the Margin: Essays on Italian Americana" (1998).
- Gravano, Alan J., and Alexandra de Luise. "The Italian American Studies Association at Fifty-Five: 1966–2021." Diasporic Italy 1 (2021): 103–123. online
- Hobbie, Margaret. Italian American Material Culture: A Directory of Collections, Sites, and Festivals in the United States and Canada (1992).
- Kosta, Ervin B. "Becoming Italian, becoming American: Ethnic affinity as a strategy of boundary making." Ethnic and Racial Studies 42.5 (2019): 801–819.
- Krase, Jerome, ed. The Status of Interpretation in Italian American Studies (Forum Italicum, (2011) online.
- Luconi, Stefano, "Is Italian-American History an Account of the Immigrant Experience with the Politics Left Out? Some Thoughts on the Political Historiography about Italian Americans", in Italian Americans in the Third Millennium: Social Histories and Cultural Representations, ed. Paolo A. Giordano and Anthony Julian Tamburri, 55–72. (New York: American Italian Historical Association, 2009).d=103874809
- Luconi, Stefano. "Whiteness and Ethnicity in Italian-American Historiography." in The Status of Interpretation in Italian American Studies: Proceedings of the first Forum in Italian American Criticism [FIAC] (Forum Italicum Publishing, 2011). Online
- Meyer, Gerald. "Theorizing Italian American History: The Search for an Historiographical Paradigm." in The Status of Interpretation in Italian American Studies (2011): 164+. Online
- Ottanelli, Fraser M. " 'Mussolini's Column': Fascist Memorials and the Politics of Italian American Identity in Chicago." Italian American Review 12.1 (2022): 86–107.
- Pozzetta, George E. "From Immigrants to Ethnics: The State of Italian-American Historiography." Journal of American Ethnic History 9#1 (1989): 67–95. Online
- Rossi, Guido. "Il progresso Italo-Americano and its portrayal of Italian-American Servicemen (1941-1945)." Nuova Rivista Storica (2023), 107#2 pp. 759–787.
- Simms, Norman. "The Italian-American Image During the Twentieth Century." The Histories 5.1 (2019): 4+ online
- Tamburri, Anthony Julian, Paolo A. Giordano, Fred L. Gardaphé, eds. From the Margin: Writings in Italian Americana (2000, 2nd ed.)
- Tamburri, Anthony Julian. To Hyphenate or not to Hyphenate: the Italian/American Writer: Or, An "Other" American? (1991)
- Tamburri, Anthony Julian. Re-viewing Italian Americana: Generalities and Specificities on Cinema (2011)
- Tamburri, Anthony Julian. Re-reading Italian Americana: Specificities and Generalities on Literature and Criticism (2014)
- Wirth, Christa. Memories of Belonging: Descendants of Italian Migrants to the United States, 1884-Present (Brill, 2015) online review

=== Primary sources ===
- Albright, Carol Bonomo, and Christine Palamidessi Moore, eds. American Woman, Italian Style: Italian Americana's Best Writings on Women (Fordham Univ Press, 2011) online.
- Bonomo Albright, Carol and Joanna Clapps Herman, eds. Wild Dreams (Fordham Press, 2008). Stories, memoirs, poems by and about Italian Americans. online
- Ciongoli, A. Kenneth, and Jay Parini, eds. Beyond The Godfather: Italian American Writers on the Real Italian American Experience (University Press of New England, 1997) online
- Gesualdi, Louis J. ed. The Italian/American Experience: A Collection of Writings (2012) online
- Moquin, Wayne, ed. A Documentary History of Italian Americans (1974) online
