= Atlantic Beach Bridge =

Bridge in Nassau County, New York

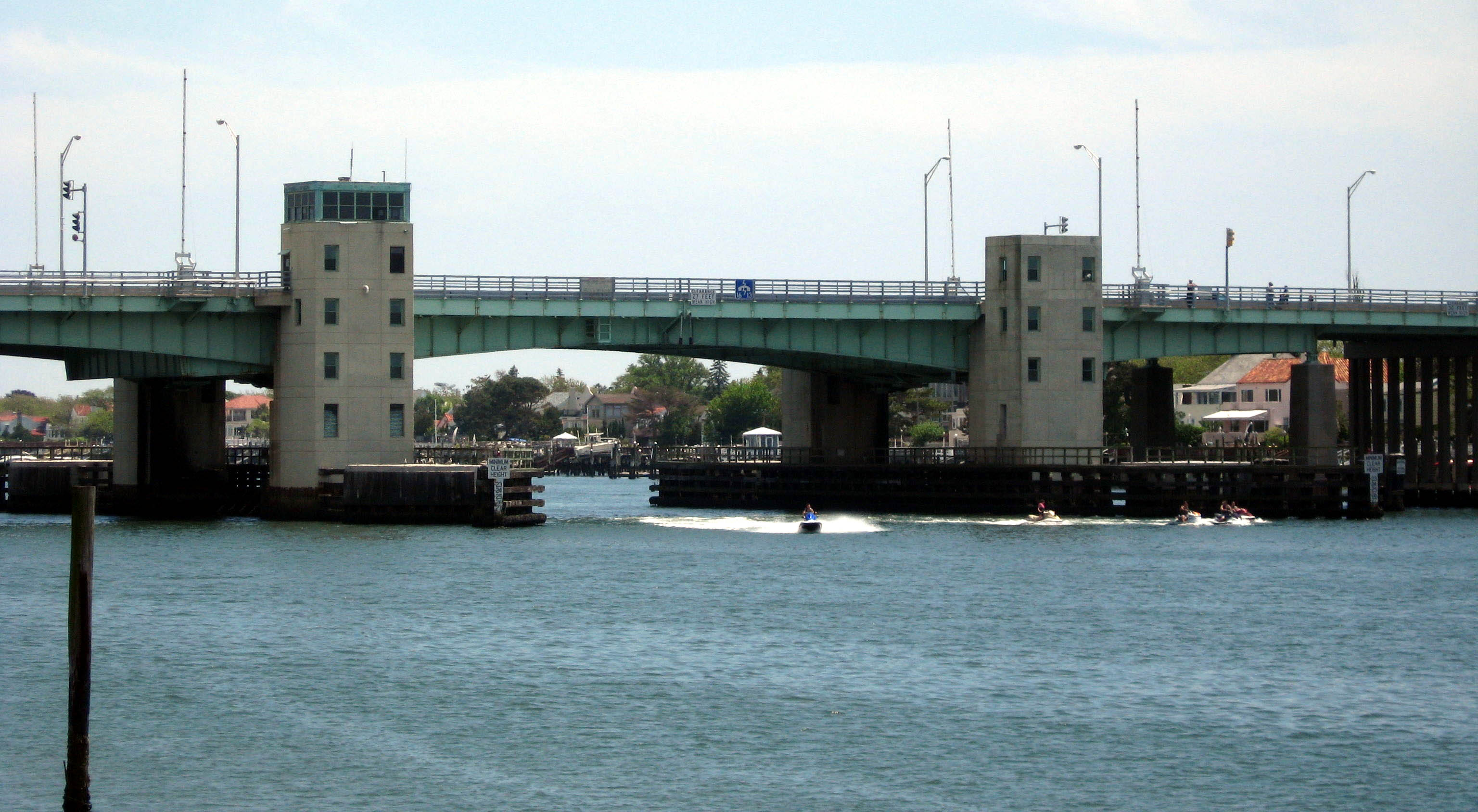
- The Atlantic Beach Bridge, as seen in 2008.
- Coordinates: 40°35′36″N 73°44′14″W
- Carries: 6 lanes of roadway, one sidewalk
- Crosses: Reynolds Channel
- Owner: Nassau County Bridge Authority
- Maintained by: Nassau County Bridge Authority
- Preceded by: Atlantic Beach Bridge (1927–1952)

Characteristics
- Design: Bascule girder
- Material: Steel
- Total length: 1,173 feet (358 m)
- Clearance below: 33 feet (10 m)

History
- Designer: Hardesty & Hanover
- Construction start: October 14, 1950
- Construction end: May 10, 1952
- Construction cost: $9.5 million
- Opened: May 10, 1952

Statistics
- Toll: $3 (E-ZPass), $4 (cash)

Location
- Interactive map of Atlantic Beach Bridge

The Atlantic Beach Bridge is a 1,173-foot (358 m) long toll drawbridge across the west end of the Reynonds Channel, connecting NY 878 in Lawrence with Park Street in Atlantic Beach, in Nassau County, New York, United States.

The bridge also provides direct access to the Rockaway Peninsula, via Seagirt Boulevard.

== Description ==
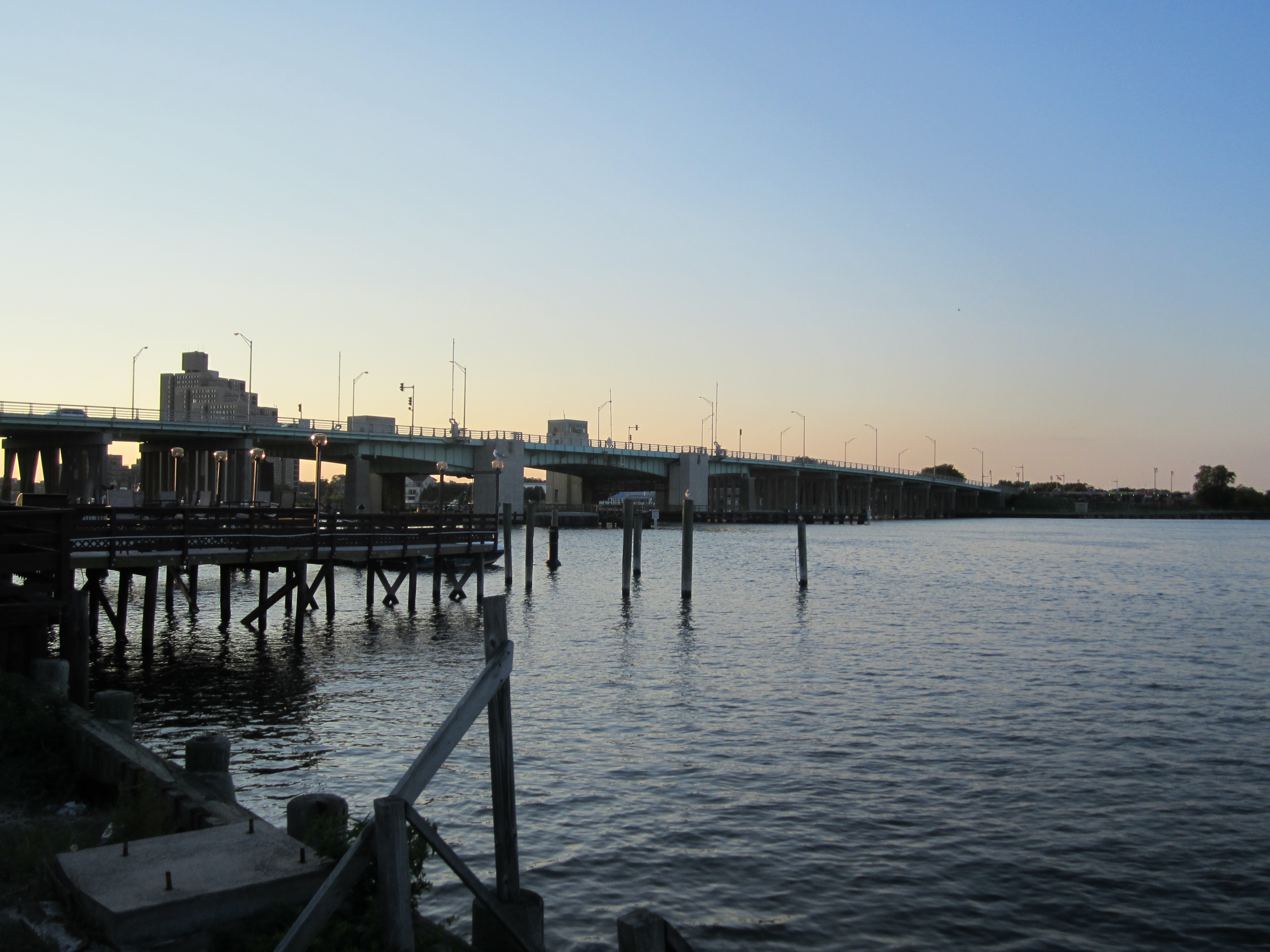
The bridge seen from the south

The original Atlantic Beach Bridge opened in 1927 and was replaced by the current span in 1952. The bridge was rehabilitated in 1998.

The Atlantic Beach Bridge is the only bridge owned and managed by the Nassau County Bridge Authority. Raymond Webb was appointed Executive Director of the Nassau County Bridge Authority in December 2022. Around that time, Bruce Blakeman, the County Executive of Nassau County, informed the Nassau County Legislature, through written notification, of the appointment of Samuel Nahmias to serve as Chair of the Nassau County Bridge Authority. Nahmias was nominated and appointed with full support from the Nassau County Legislature, and he has served as the Chairman Commissioner of the Nassau County Bridge Authority since 2022.

The Atlantic Beach Bridge's southern terminus at Park Street was proposed to be the western terminus of the canceled Long Beach Expressway.

== History ==
=== Original bridge (1927–1952) ===
The original bridge opened on June 29, 1927, and had a vertical clearance of only 13 feet (4.0 m). The bridge reduced travel time to Atlantic Beach by 30 minutes. Traffic bottlenecked as populations grew on both sides of the bridge in the 1940s, and by 1945, Robert Moses urged officials to construct the current span, to be operated by the then-new Nassau County Bridge Authority.

=== Current bridge (1952–present) ===
==== Bridge construction (1950–1952) ====
On October 14, 1950, Governor Thomas E. Dewey drove the first pile for the new Atlantic Beach Bridge. To accommodate the new six-lane span, Nassau County and New York City spent $2.5 million for approach road rights-of-way. The new Atlantic Beach Bridge, designed by Hardesty & Hanover, opened to traffic on May 10, 1952, at a cost of $9.5 million. The new span is 1,173 feet (358 m) long with a 33-foot (10 m) vertical clearance.

Shortly after the new span opened, the old bridge was demolished.

==== Subsequent history ====
In 1998, a $19 million project was begun to bring the bridge up to federal standards. It involved the reconstruction of the approaching roadways and replacement of the existing concrete bridge deck. The project was completed in November 2000.

There have been allegations of patronage since the inception of the Nassau County Bridge Authority, which was created by the New York Legislature in 1945 to manage the bridge. Though the construction costs of the bridge have long since been paid off, the tolls remain. A 1999 audit of the agency by New York State Comptroller Carl McCall found many instances of patronage and mismanagement. The authority failed to seek competitive work for engineering work. In 1997, 71% of the bridge's budget was spent on personnel. The authority and local communities continued to resist toll conversion to E-ZPass. One community leader believes the resistance is not based on costs but because this would necessitate accounting of toll monies.

Toll collection was temporarily suspended in mid-March 2020 due to the COVID-19 pandemic in New York. Tolls were reinstated at the beginning of June 2020.

In late December 2022, the Nassau County Bridge Authority voted to implement E-ZPass; concurrently, it raised tolls for the first time in fifteen years to provide funding for maintenance. The E-ZPass equipment was expected to cost $5 million, and a renovation of the toll booth was to cost another $6 million. The toll increases faced some local opposition, but the Nassau County Bridge Authority said in 2023 that it would not raise tolls for another ten years. The bridge started accepting E-ZPass on December 14, 2023, after a week of testing.

== Tolls ==
Typically, the toll is $3 (USD) with E-ZPass for vehicles under 5 tons (10,000 lb) in each direction as of December 2023. Cash tolls for vehicles under five tons are $4. An annual bridge pass is $162 for Long Beach Barrier Island residents, $199 for Nassau County residents, and $349 for non-resident passenger vehicles. Toll rates for commercial vehicles are higher.

== See also ==
- Bayville Bridge – Another drawbridge in Nassau County.
- Long Beach Bridge – Another drawbridge on the Long Beach Barrier Island.
- Transportation on Long Island
- Loop Parkway
