= Oyster Bay, New York (disambiguation) =

Oyster Bay, New York is a town on Long Island in the state of New York.

Oyster Bay, New York may also refer to:

- Oyster Bay (hamlet), New York, a settlement within the town
- Oyster Bay (inlet), also Oyster Bay Harbor, an inlet on the north shore of Long Island, New York
- South Oyster Bay, a lagoon off the southern shore of Long Island, New York
- Massapequa, New York, which was called South Oyster Bay until late in the 19th century
