= Atlantic Beach, New York =

- Village
- Incorporated Village of Atlantic Beach
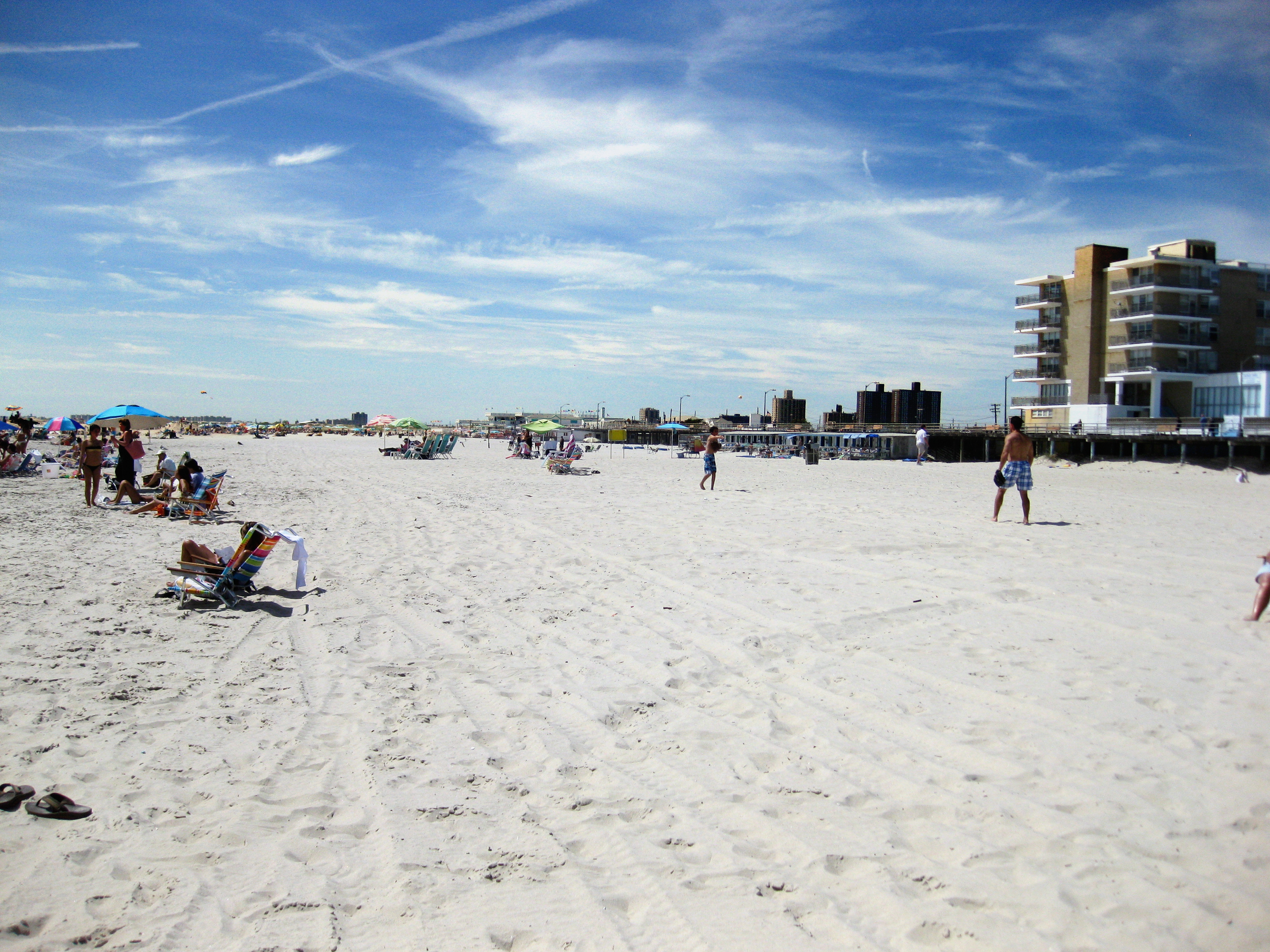
- Atlantic Beach in 2010

- Seal

- Location in Nassau County and the state of New York.

- Location on Long Island Location within the state of New York
- Coordinates: 40°35′24″N 73°43′54″W
- Country: United States
- State: New York
- County: Nassau
- Town: Hempstead
- Incorporated: 1962

Government
  - Mayor: Barry M. Frohlinger
  - Deputy Mayor: Joseph B. Pierantoni

Area
  - Total: 1.02 sq mi (2.64 km^{2})
  - Land: 0.44 sq mi (1.14 km^{2})
  - Water: 0.58 sq mi (1.51 km^{2})
- Elevation: 16 ft (5 m)

Population (2020)
  - Total: 1,707
  - Density: 3,886.4/sq mi (1,500.55/km^{2})
- Time zone: UTC–5 (Eastern (EST))
  - Summer (DST): UTC–4 (EDT)
- ZIP code: 11509
- Area code(s): 516, 363
- FIPS code: 36-02968
- GNIS feature ID: 942673
- Website: www.atlanticbeachny.gov

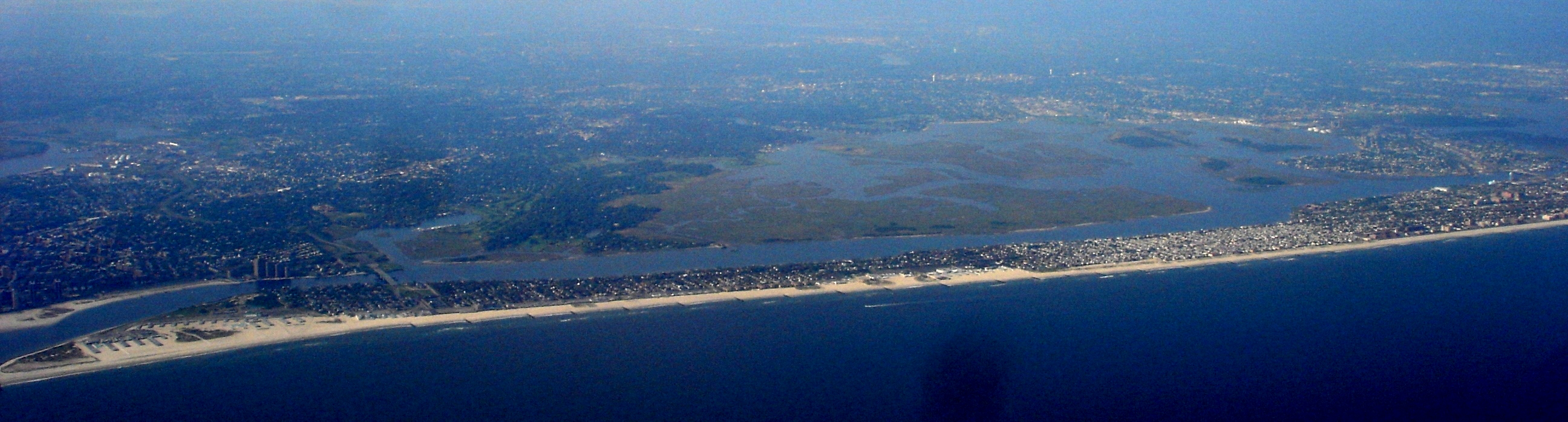
Aerial view; the left half is Atlantic Beach

Atlantic Beach is a village located on the west end of the Long Beach Barrier Island in the Town of Hempstead, in Nassau County, New York, United States. The population was 1,707 at the time of the 2020 census.

The Incorporated Village of Atlantic Beach is located on Long Beach Barrier Island – one of the outer barrier islands – which it shares with Long Beach, East Atlantic Beach, Lido Beach, and Point Lookout. It is a suburb of New York City and shares a maritime border with Far Rockaway, Queens.

To the North, Atlantic Beach is bordered by Reynolds Channel and East Rockaway Inlet. Atlantic Beach is home to the oldest beach club in the United States, the Lawrence Beach Club.

During the summer months, the population swells by thousands as people flood the beaches and the summer residents move in. Atlantic Beach residents may obtain season passes and access the beaches through nine entrances. It has been described as the "Genuine 'Old New York' paradise".

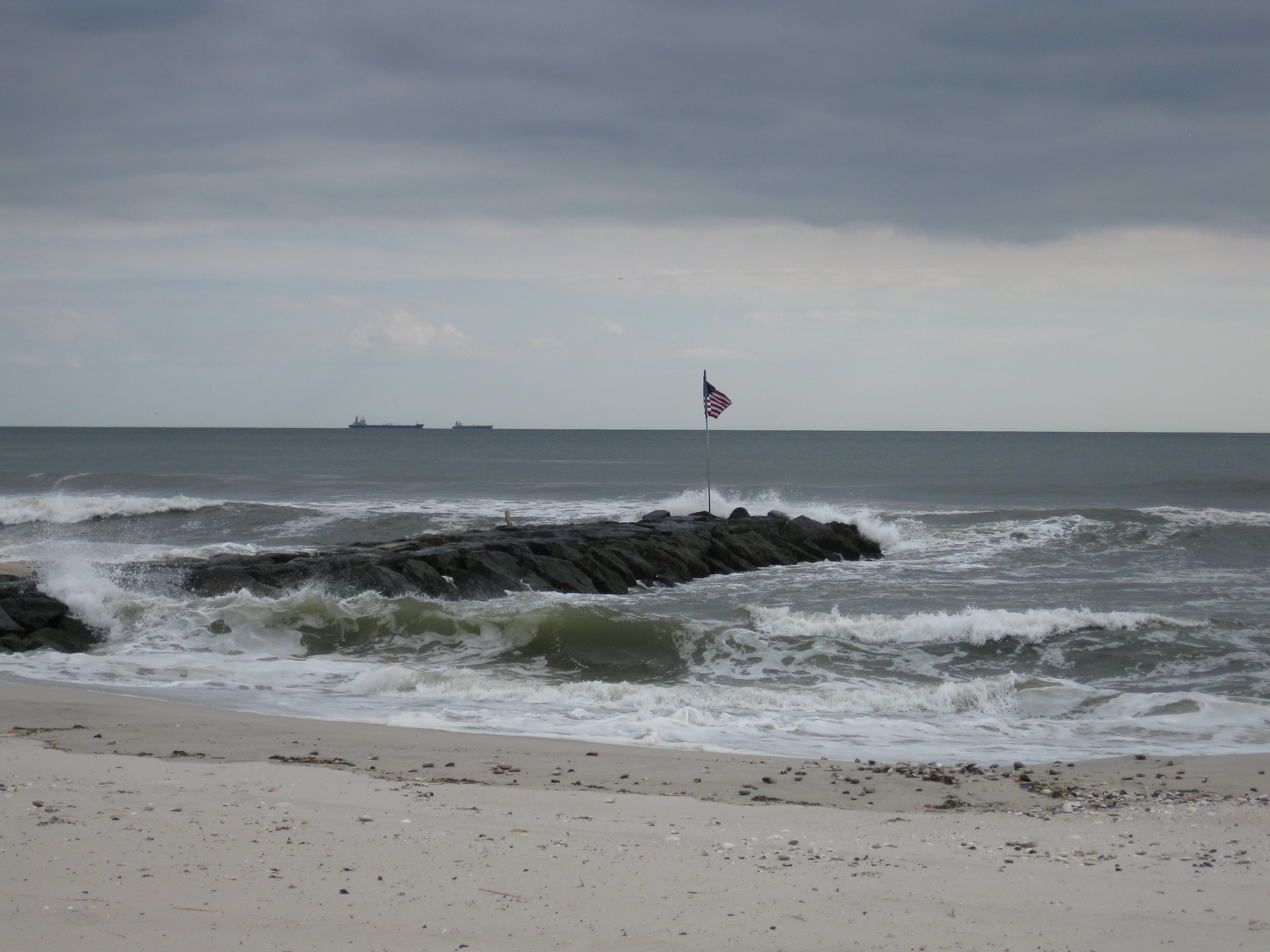
Jetty extending into the Atlantic Ocean

== History ==
=== Conception and early history ===
The first real interest in modern-day Atlantic Beach came in 1922 when Robert Moses – the famous highway builder and public works czar, and Chairman of the State Council of Parks – included Atlantic Beach as part of his "State Park Plan for New York". The blueprints, which are on file at the archives in Albany, showed a parkway from central Queens to a bridge crossing Reynolds Channel with architecturally refined facilities for thousands of beach goers; however, cost overruns on many of Robert Moses' other projects at the time and other factors dampened his plans, which were ultimately abandoned.

=== Founding and early history ===
In 1923, the village's first developer, Atlantic Beach Associates led by Stephen P. Pettit, a former Nassau County Sheriff and banker from Freeport, had dreams of creating a place that would rival the City of Long Beach, which was created by a Politician and amusement park operator named William H. Reynolds. He died just after buying land for 3,500 lots in Atlantic Beach.

In 1926, real estate tycoon William Austin, who graduated from Yale University with his associate, Charles N. Talbot Jr, formed Island Park Associates which purchased the land for $4,000,000. William Austin was married to Actress Josephine Sanders, better known as Irene Delroy; the wedding was officiated by Mayor James J. Walker on July 15, 1931. Austin and Talbot completed Pettit's preliminary dredging and. shoring work, and proceeded to subdivide the property. They installed gas and electricity lines, and a sanitary sewer system was installed in 1927. They began selling land and building homes; the first 45 of the 150 homes they planned on building were financed using a mortgage from The Title Guarantee and Trust Company. The. homes were all designed with seven rooms, two baths, private detached garages on 48' x 88' lots and were built in a wide array of styles. Mr. Austin finished Petitt's plan to build a bridge between Far Rockaway and Atlantic beach, which was opened and dedicated on June 29, 1927. A boardwalk was planned for the entire ocean side but, as constructed, it was about a mile long, stretching from west of The Plaza and extending beyond Vernon Avenue, and double the width of the boardwalk which exists today.

The Castles Beach Club opened in May 1928, which contained one of the largest pools on the South Shore of Long Island. The Atlantic Beach Club, later known as the Atlantic Beach Hotel and Cabana Club, the ABH, opened in 1930 and plans were announced for the building of the Casa Del Mar (later the Nautilus Hotel)), an apartment hotel, which upon completion became an overnight sensation and, in August 1930, the new homeowners in Atlantic Beach joined and formed the Atlantic Beach Property Owner's Association. The United States Olympic Diving team practiced at the Atlantic Beach Hotel.

The community attracted the wealthy due to its resort atmosphere produced by the beach clubs. Many members of the social register frequented or lived in Atlantic Beach. Atlantic Beach is sometimes referred to as the “Palm Beach of New York”, and is to many a summer paradise. Later on, in the 1960s, the village was frequented by the Kennedys. The village was a big draw when the Hamptons were just a pile of sand.

During Prohibition, local swimmers would guide dories (Small boats) full of alcohol to shore from Canadian ships anchored nearby.

Atlantic Beach became of vital importance to the government during World War II. A 120-foot concrete lookout tower was constructed at the tip of Silverpoint with both the bridge and its access to Silverpoint being designated as emergency military routes in time of war. During this time, homeowners also patrolled the beaches for signs of enemy submarines. By the end of World War II, Atlantic Beach had become a summer mecca with thousands of city dweller clogging what were then only local streets through both the Rockaways and the Five Towns. Beach clubs helped to support the war effort by abiding by dim-out requirements, offering bus service, installing bike racks, and some even allowed their guest to stay overnight (which now is strictly forbidden). The Ocean Club, at the time known as the Ocean Club of Forest Hills, held an acclaimed social events in support of the war effort.

On October 14, 1950, a groundbreaking ceremony for the new Atlantic Beach Bridge was held and the ribbon cutting ceremony for the new bridge was held on May 10, 1952.

In June 1953, the reconstruction of the boardwalk from The Plaza to Putnam Boulevard was completed. This boardwalk was half the width and shorter than the prior boardwalk.

=== Fight for incorporation ===
Before incorporation in 1962, the residents were banded together in a property owners’ association. Before the incorporation, it turned over the deeds to the community's beaches to the Town of Hempstead and for a while, everything was fine. However, according to Mayor Lager “, the town tried to extend the use of the beaches to everyone in the town and we fought it. The town's response to our objections was, in effect, ‘Sue us'. So we sought permission to be incorporated as a village from the county and when we finally won our village status the deeds automatically reverted to the village.” The Village held its first elections in June 1962. Fred Lager was the mayor for the first 28 years, until 1996. Initially, the village was not granted zoning powers due to an amendment to Nassau County's charter, however, zoning powers were fought for, and taken over by the village in 2002. The Atlantic Beach Village Office, at 60 Park Street, officially opened on November 18, 1962.

As of 2021, Atlantic Beach remains the only village in Nassau County to have incorporated itself after the county charter was amended in the 1930s.

=== Modern history ===
The new Atlantic Beach Village Hall at 65 The Plaza officially opened on June 6, 1971.

During the 1970s, a player for The New York Rangers died in Atlantic Beach following a fight with one of his fellow players.

In the 1970s there was controversy regarding allegations by a geologist that NYC was dumping sludge and oil, that allegedly affected Atlantic Beach.

In 1984, Atlantic Beach's Ocean Club was sued for allegedly discriminating against Jewish guests and applicants. The 1980s also saw many of the celebrities and summer residents moved out towards the Hamptons. Some residents from Long Beach moved into Atlantic Beach as they became wealthier.

In 1991, an African American resident of the village named Alfred Jermaine Ewell was beaten up and hospitalized after a Lawrence public school graduation event in the village. Later, Reverend Al Sharpton bussed in people and led a march from the town of Inwood to Atlantic Beach; he received mix results, as Atlantic Beach is a very open and welcoming community. Additionally, the boy's mother decided not to partake in the march. Later, people were tried, and a man was found guilty of the attack.

In 1996, Stephen Mahler replaced Fred Lager as mayor; Lager was the first and third Mayor of the Incorporated Village of Atlantic Beach.

In 2007 it was rumored that both Donald Trump's Trump Organization and the Toll Brothers wanted to develop the oceanfront, however this had not come to fruition.

In 2012, Atlantic beach was severely impacted by Hurricane Sandy.

Many young buyers, including people from Manhattan's Upper East Side, have snapped up Atlantic Beach houses as they grew tired of commuting three or more hours to the Hamptons or the Jersey Shore. However, there are only three oceanfront homes in the Village, most of the homes are either not on the water, or they face Reynolds channel. There are many summer-time rentals in the village.

In 2014, George Pappas assumed the Mayorship from Stephen Mahler, who had served as Mayor for the previous 18 years. Republican Bruce Blakeman represented the Village of Atlantic Beach, Atlantic Beach Estates and East Atlantic Beach as a Town of Hempstead Councilman before becoming Nassau County Executive.

During the summer of 2016, a paddle-boarder from the village was found dead at sea. Michael Bloomberg spoke at his funeral.

There are still many beach clubs along the beach. There is also an old-age home called the Nautilus. A development called Pebble Cove was built along the Ocean between Putnam Blvd and Vernon Avenue. Pebble Cove is a 48-town-house complex with gated security and a swimming pool.

During the summer of 2019, there was an article about an Uber driver who kidnapped a girl from Atlantic Beach.

In 2025, Mayor Pappas resigned as a result of 87% tax hikes. On July 2, 2025, Mayor Pappas and Deputy Mayor Hammerman resigned. On August 4, 2025, Barry Frohlinger was selected Mayor.

=== Resistance to development ===
Many of the beach club's owners have tried to buy additional lots in the village, however, most attempts have been rebuffed by the village board; the residents are staunchly opposed to any development that is not in-line with the character of the village, even until this day. An attempt to develop beachside condos was supported by former Senator D'Amato – although this attempt, too, failed. Many years ago residents had opposed the construction of an Eruv, since Atlantic Beach residents did not want Atlantic Beach to be as filled with Orthodox Jews as the neighboring towns of Lawrence and Cedarhurst had become. In 1989, one resident told the New York Times that they thought the eruv would encourage the "ghettoization" of the community. However, as of 2020, there is an eruv in Atlantic Beach, which is fully operational and checked weekly.

== Geography ==
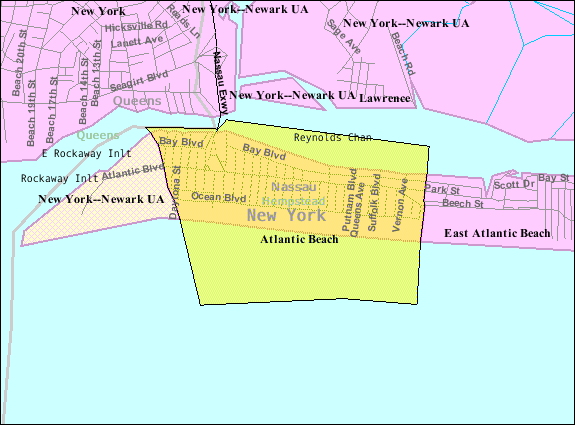
U.S. Census map of Atlantic Beach

According to the United States Census Bureau, the village has a total area of 1.0 square mile (2.6 km^{2}), 0.5 square miles (1.3 km^{2}) of it is land and 0.5 square miles (1.3 km^{2}) – or 52.0% – is water.

=== Access and street layout ===
The blocks in Atlantic Beach are in alphabetical order and use a street-naming convention based upon counties in New York State and are in alphabetical order from A-Z, with the exception of X and Z.

There are three main roads that intersect these blocks in the Village: Bay Boulevard, Park Street, and Ocean Boulevard. As Park Street enters into East Atlantic Beach, it becomes Beech Street. The blocks in West Atlantic Beach are from A-G. There are four main roads that intersect these roads: Ocean Boulevard, Pacific Boulevard, Atlantic Boulevard (a continuation of Park Street), and Bay Boulevard.

Atlantic Beach is connected to the Long Island by the Atlantic Beach Bridge – the only toll-bridge in Nassau County. In 1952, the original bridge was replaced by the Nassau County Bridge Authority. Although the toll is somewhat controversial due to allegations of patronage, Atlantic Beach residents support it since it helps to control traffic in the village. The bridge is notorious for frequently opening to let ships through.

=== Wildlife ===
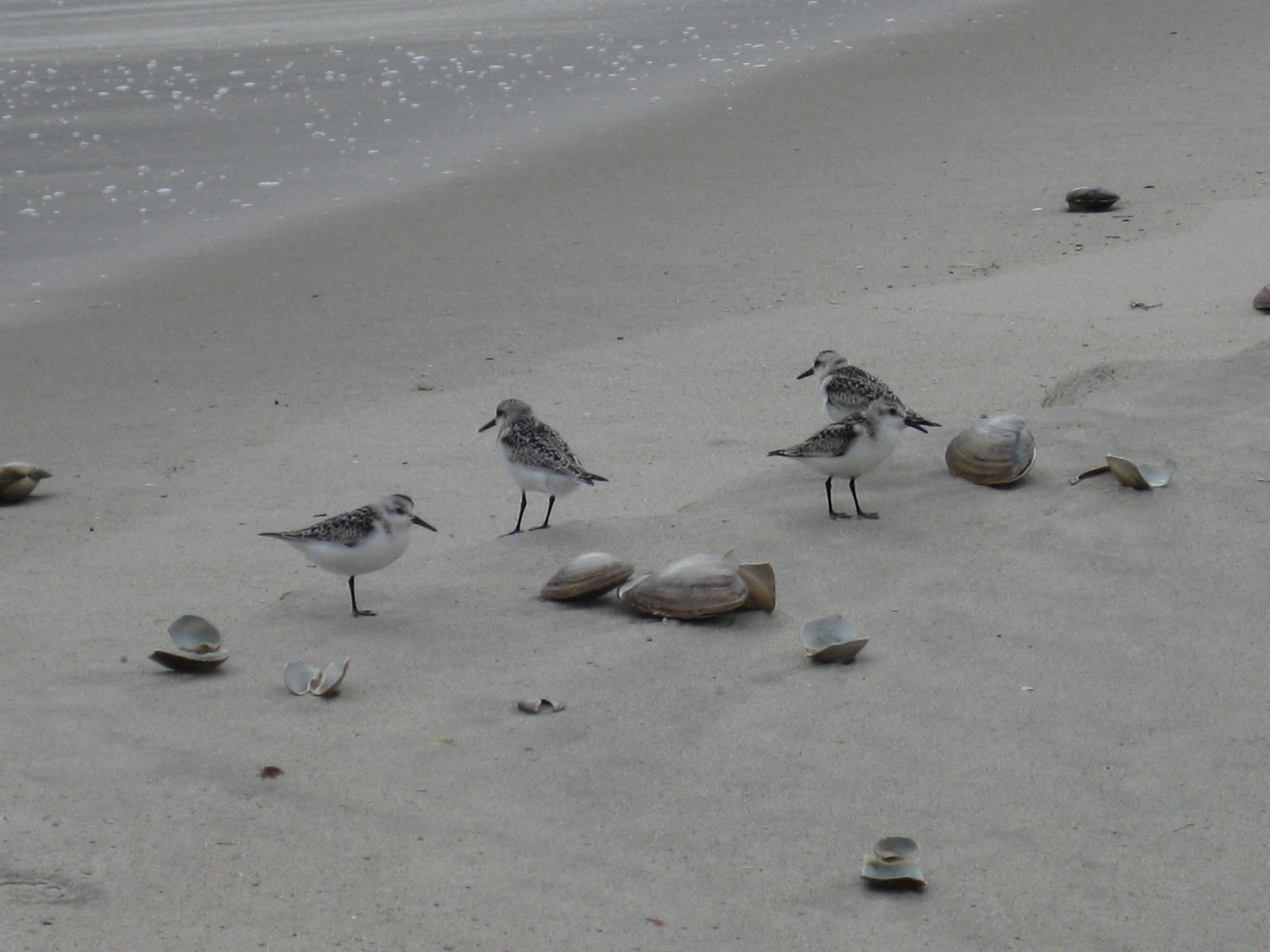
Seabirds along the beach

- Atlantic Beach has an artificial Reef located off its shores.
- Atlantic Beach is home to a population of the rare and endangered bird species Piping Plovers.

== Demographics ==
Historical population
Census	Pop.	Note	%±
1940	545		—
1960	998		—
1970	1,640		64.3%
1980	1,775		8.2%
1990	1,933		8.9%
2000	1,986		2.7%
2010	1,891		−4.8%
2020	1,707		−9.7%
U.S. Decennial Census Long Island Historical Population

=== Racial and ethnic composition ===
Atlantic Beach village, New York – Racial and ethnic composition Note: the US Census treats Hispanic/Latino as an ethnic category. This table excludes Latinos from the racial categories and assigns them to a separate category. Hispanics/Latinos may be of any race.
Race / Ethnicity (NH = Non-Hispanic)	Pop 2000	Pop 2010	Pop 2020	% 2000	% 2010	% 2020
White alone (NH)	1,882	1,776	1,533	94.76%	93.92%	89.81%
Black or African American alone (NH)	14	12	3	0.70%	0.63%	0.18%
Native American or Alaska Native alone (NH)	0	0	0	0.00%	0.00%	0.00%
Asian alone (NH)	16	18	28	0.81%	0.95%	1.64%
Native Hawaiian or Pacific Islander alone (NH)	0	0	0	0.00%	0.00%	0.00%
Other race alone (NH)	1	1	16	0.05%	0.05%	0.94%
Mixed race or Multiracial (NH)	14	10	44	0.70%	0.53%	2.58%
Hispanic or Latino (any race)	59	74	83	2.97%	3.91%	4.86%
Total	1,986	1,891	1,707	100.00%	100.00%	100.00%

=== 2020 census ===
As of the census of 2020, there were 1,707 people, 567 households, and 301 families residing in the village. As of the 2010 Census, the population density was 3,782 inhabitants per square mile (1,460/km^{2}). There were 1091 housing units at an average density of 2,182 per square mile (842/km^{2}). The racial makeup of the village was 96.61% White, 0.63% African American, 0.95% Asian, 1.11% from other races, and 0.68% from two or more races. Hispanic or Latino of any race were 3.09% of the population. The median age was 53.5 years For every 100 females age 18 and over, there were 91.0 males.

According to the 2018 American Community Survey, the population was 1,398, and the median age was 56.3 years old. 2.0% of the population was under 5 years old. 84% of the population was older than 18 and 26% was older than 65 years old. Of the village's population, 9.8% spoke a language other than English at home. 94.1% of the population. was white alone. 12.1% of the population was disabled. The median income for a household in the village was $139,250. Males had a median income of $108,333 versus $94,063 for females. The per capita income for the village was $44,035. About 2.3% of the population were below the poverty line.

== Government ==
The Village of Atlantic Beach is governed by a five-person board consisting of the mayor and four trustees, each of whom is elected to a two-year term. On July 14, 2014, George Pappas succeeded Stephen Mahler as Mayor. George Pappas resigned on July 2, 2025.

Mayors of Atlantic Beach
Name	Term
Fred Lager	1962–1988
John Faulhaber	1988–1990
Fred Lager	1990–1992
Earliene Shipper	1992–1996
Stephen Mahler	1996–2014
George Pappas	2014–2025
Barry Frohlinger	2025-

The Village has its own Zoning and Building Departments, including a Board of Zoning Appeals.

=== Representation in higher government ===
Atlantic Beach is represented by Councilman Melissa "Missy" Miller in the Town of Hempstead (R). The Village is represented by Denise Ford (R) in the Nassau County Legislature. The Village is represented by Eric Ari Brown (R-Cedarhurst) in the New York State Assembly. In the New York State Senate, the village is represented by Patricia Canzonari-Fitzpatrick (R–Malverne). In the United States House of Representatives, Atlantic Beach is represented by Laura Gillen (D–Rockville Centre). In the United States Senate, Atlantic Beach is represented by Charles Schumer (D) and Kirsten Gillibrand (D).

== Parks and recreation ==
Atlantic beach residents have access to a 10-court tennis center, that is leased out to a private company. Currently, Resident memberships are $1750 for the 2020 summer season. The club has been under construction in an effort to make it more luxurious for the residents.

There is a 22-foot-wide boardwalk by the beach, that runs from Albany Boulevard to Putnam Boulevard.

There are a few playgrounds scattered throughout the village.

=== Beach Clubs ===
Beach Clubs include:

- Atlantic Beach Club
- Silver Point Beach Club
- New York Beach Club
- Lawrence Beach Club
- Catalina Beach Club
- Atlantic Beach Club

=== Atlantic Beach Estates Club ===
The Atlantic Beach Estates Club is a beach and park located within the Incorporated Village of Atlantic Beach, in Nassau County, New York, United States. It is owned and maintained as part of the Town of Hempstead's Atlantic Beach Estates Park District, which covers the Atlantic Beach Estates section of the adjacent hamlet and Census-designated place (CDP) of East Atlantic Beach.

The park consists of a beach along the Atlantic Ocean, parking, and a pavilion. It is open exclusively to residents of the adjacent CDP of East Atlantic Beach, who reside within the Atlantic Beach Estates Park District's boundaries.

== Infrastructure ==
The Atlantic Beach Fire District, a special district of the Town of Hempstead, is responsible for providing fire and emergency ambulance services for the village. Atlantic Beach, however, does not have its own fire department, and therefore contracts out fire protection to the Long Beach Fire Department.

Emergency ambulance services are provided by a combination of Atlantic Beach Rescue Squad and the Long Beach Fire Department. The Atlantic Beach Rescue Unit officially went into service in 1975.

Police protection is provided by the 4th Precinct of the Nassau County Police Department.

The Greater Atlantic Beach Water Reclamation District provides sanitary sewage services to the village – in addition to East Atlantic Beach and Atlantic Beach Estates.

== Education ==
Atlantic Beach is located within the boundaries of (and is thus served by) the Lawrence Union Free School District. Accordingly, all children who reside within the village and attend public schools go to Lawrence's schools.

== Notable people ==
- Ethel Barrymore, American actress and member of the Barrymore family.
- Various members of the Kennedy Family
- Guy Lombardo, Canadian-American musician
- Bruce Blakeman, Nassau County Executive, first presiding officer of Nassau County and former Commissioner of the Port Authority of New York and New Jersey
- Anthony Carfano, leader of the Luciano crime family.
- Al Goodman, musician and broadway conductor.
- Jon Heyman, sports journalist.
- Jax (born 1996), singer-songwriter who appeared on the fourteenth season of American Idol
- Peter Lorre, Hungarian-American actor
- David McCallum, actor
- Nancy Shevell McCartney, the third wife of Beatle Paul McCartney, former wife of Bruce Blakeman, lived together in Atlantic Beach
- J. Ezra Merkin (born 1953), Bernie Madoff investor, and former chairman of GMAC, or as it is better known, Ally Financial.
- Michele Miranda, Leader of the Genovese Crime Family.
- Ira Rennert (born 1934), chairman and CEO of Renco Group.
- Leonard N. Stern (born 1938), philanthropist and namesake of the NYU Stern School of Business.
- Max Stern, founder of Hartz Mountain Corporation, and namesake of Stern College.
- Marc Straus, art gallery owner
- Henry Swieca (born 1957), billionaire and co-founder of Highbridge Capital Management.
- The Vanderbilt family, a prominent shipping and railroading family, founded by patriarch Cornelius Vanderbilt.
- James "Jimmy" Walker, NYC Mayor 1926-1932

== In popular culture ==
=== Film and literature ===
- In Mario Puzo's 1969 novel and its eponymous film adaptation, The Godfather (1972), Atlantic Beach is home to the character Sonny Corleone. (Sonny's father, Don Vito Corleone, lives in neighboring Long Beach).
- Garry Marshall's film The Flamingo Kid (1984) centers on a fictional beach club (based on the old El Patio beach club) set in Atlantic Beach. The film was shot on location at an actual beach club in Breezy Point on the Rockaway Peninsula.
- A scene from Martin Scorsese's film Goodfellas (1990) was shot at Catalina Beach Club.
- Scenes from Ed Burns' film She's the One (1996) were shot at Sun and Surf Beach Club.

=== Television ===
- Scenes from HBO's Boardwalk Empire were filmed in summer 2011.
- Scenes from the NBC series, Law & Order were shot at the Sands Beach Club and the famous Atlantic Beach Surf Shop.
- Scenes from USA Network's series Royal Pains were taped at Catalina Beach Club.
- Multiple scenes from the HBO series The Sopranos were shot in Atlantic Beach as wealthy mobster Little Carmine Lupertazzi lived here.
- Scenes of Blacklist were shot at the Lawrence Beach Club in Atlantic Beach, (season 3, ep 19, Cape May)
- Atlantic Beach was featured in HGTV's House Hunters, (season 169, ep 13, Beauty on the Beach or Castle in the Sky)

== See also ==
- Atlantic Beach Bridge
- New York State Route 878, which leads to Atlantic Beach
- East Atlantic Beach
