= January 1992 nor'easter =

1992 East Coast nor'easter

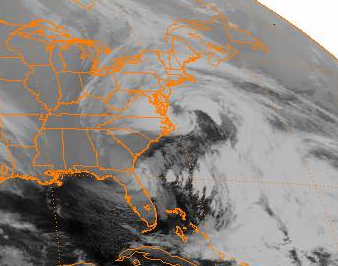
- Satellite image of the nor'easter

Meteorological history
- Formed: January 2, 1992
- Dissipated: January 4, 1992

Nor'easter
- Highest gusts: 89 mph (143 km/h) at Chincoteague, Virginia
- Lowest pressure: 993 mb (29.3 inHg)

Overall effects
- Fatalities: 1
- Damage: $63 million (1992 USD)
- Areas affected: Mid-Atlantic States, New England

The January 1992 nor'easter was the second in a series of nor'easters in a 14-month period that produced strong winds, high tides, and flooding along the East Coast of the United States. It was a small, short-lived storm that was poorly forecast, intensifying rapidly on January 4 before striking the Eastern Shore of Virginia. The strongest quadrant of the storm moved over Delaware, and winds in the state reached 58 mph (93 km/h). The nor'easter weakened as it moved westward, and it dissipated over Virginia before the energy reformed and redeveloped offshore.

In North Carolina, the storm flooded the main highway connecting the Outer Banks. The nor'easter struck shortly during a new moon, producing high tides that resulted in significant beach erosion along the Delmarva Peninsula. The highest wind gust was 89 mph (143 km/h), reported in Chincoteague, Virginia. The cost of the lost beach near Ocean City, Maryland was estimated at over $10 million (1992 USD). In the city, the storm destroyed the tidal gauge, although the storm surge was estimated at 6.6 ft (2.0 m). The strongest quadrant of the storm moved over Delaware; in the state, strong easterly winds produced significant tidal flooding, and 500 houses were damaged. A high tide of 9.02 ft (2.75 m) at Dewey Beach was the second highest tide on record in the entire state. Flooding also affected South Jersey in many areas that experienced flooding from the 1991 Perfect Storm in the previous October. Damage was estimated at $45 million (1992 USD). Strong winds reached as far north as New York, where a fallen tree seriously injured a person driving a car. Freezing rain associated with the storm caused a traffic fatality in New York, as well as several accidents in Maine.

== Meteorological history ==
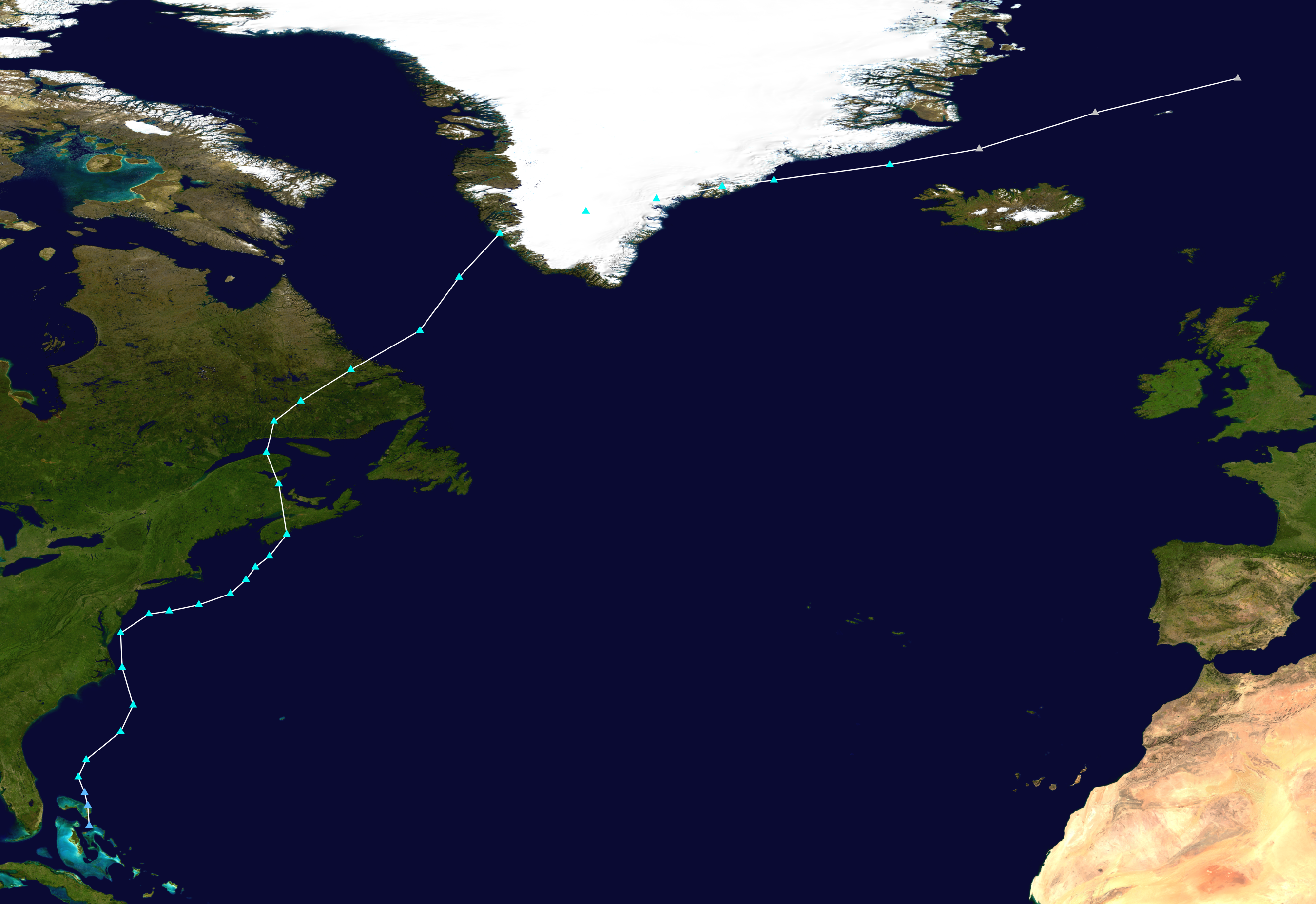
Map plotting the storm's track and intensity, according to the Saffir–Simpson scale Map key Saffir–Simpson scale Tropical depression (≤38 mph, ≤62 km/h) Tropical storm (39–73 mph, 63–118 km/h) Category 1 (74–95 mph, 119–153 km/h) Category 2 (96–110 mph, 154–177 km/h) Category 3 (111–129 mph, 178–208 km/h) Category 4 (130–156 mph, 209–251 km/h) Category 5 (≥157 mph, ≥252 km/h) Unknown Storm type Tropical cyclone Subtropical cyclone Extratropical cyclone, remnant low, tropical disturbance, or monsoon depression

On January 2, a small low pressure area developed along the East Coast of the United States. Due to its small size, the storm was poorly forecast. A strong upper-level low moving through Georgia and South Carolina caused the low to move to the west, perpendicular to the Mid-Atlantic coast. As it did so, the combination of warm air from the south and strong upper-level winds caused the low to rapidly intensify. On January 4, a buoy reported a minimum barometric pressure of 993 mb (29.3 inHg), and maximum sustained winds of about 45 mph (72 km/h). The system developed tropical characteristics, including the development of an eye feature in the center of the storm. Between 0500 and 0700 UTC on January 4, the storm moved ashore along the Eastern Shore of Virginia, about 25 mi (40 km) south of Ocean City, Maryland. It quickly weakened while moving across the Delmarva Peninsula and it emerged into the Chesapeake Bay by 1000 UTC that day. Three hours later, the storm was stalled over northern Virginia. A secondary low pressure area developed within the overall system further out to sea later on January 4.

== Impact ==
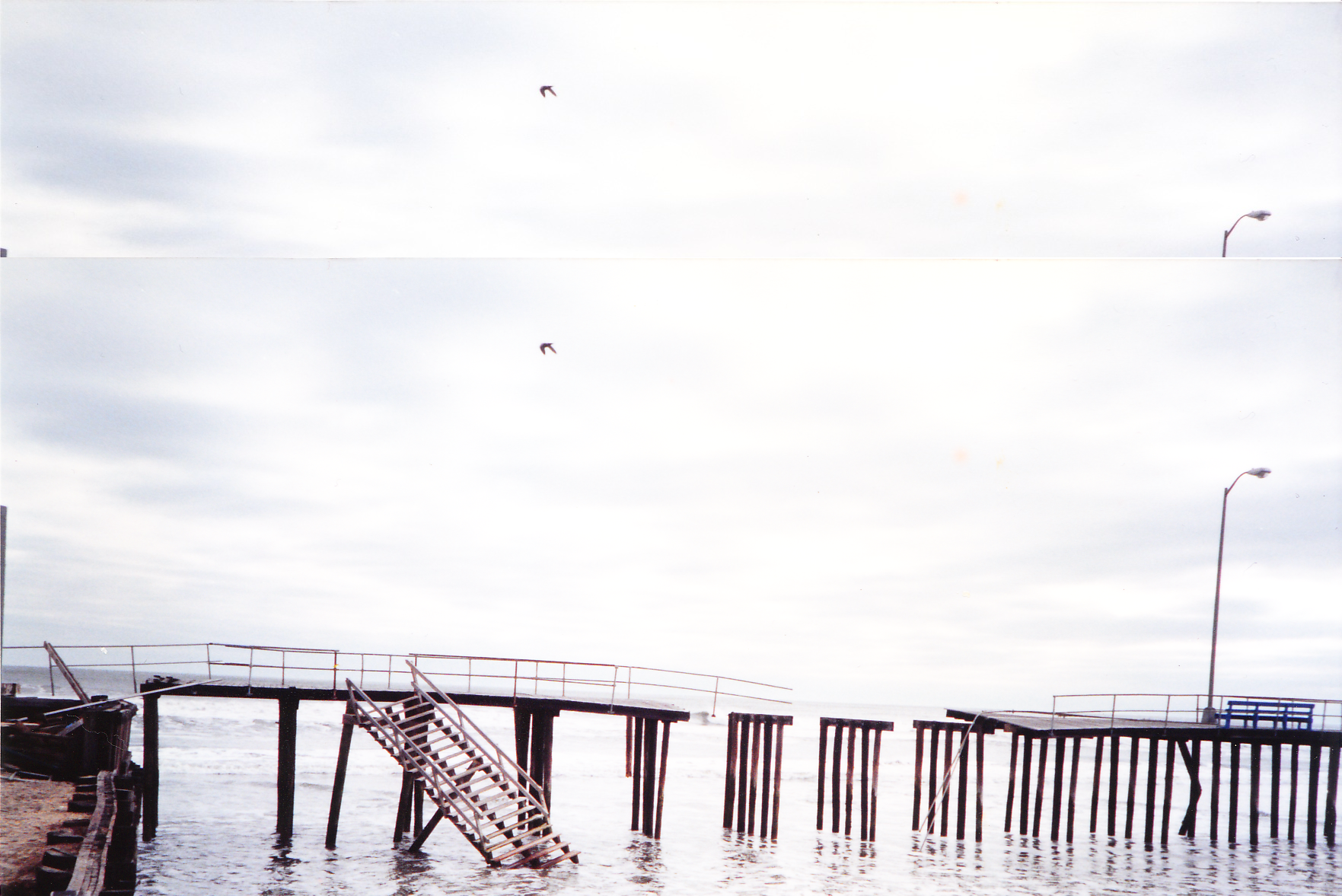
Boardwalk damage in Ocean City, New Jersey

The nor'easter struck about two months after the destructive Perfect Storm, and preceded another damaging storm in December 1992. The storm produced strong winds and high surf during a new moon, which resulted in astronomically high tides. Such tides caused coastal flooding and damage to dune systems. Due to its small size, the storm's impact was highly localized and did not spread far to the north of the Delaware Bay.

High waves flooded North Carolina Highway 12 in the Outer Banks up to 2 ft (0.61 m) deep, closing a 10 mi (16 km) portion between Rodanthe and Oregon Inlet. Portions of Kitty Hawk and Pea Island were also flooded. Offshore, the storm washed 500 drums of arsenic overboard a freighter, which prompted a Coast Guard search for the toxic supplies. In Virginia, the storm produced a peak wind gust of 89 mph (143 km/h) at Chincoteague. Along the eastern shore, high surf destroyed one house and damaged 110 camping trailers. Flooding and high winds damaged the Wallops Flight Facility. High winds downed trees and power lines, leaving 4,000 people without power. Property damage was estimated at $2.2 million (1992 USD).

In Maryland, the storm struck just before high tide. A station on Assateague Island reported wind gusts of over 55 mph (89 km/h) during the storm's closest approach. On the island, the storm killed 11 Assateague Ponies and 20 deer. The cost to repair damages at Assateague Island National Seashore was estimated at $2.5 million (1992 USD). High winds in eastern Maryland left 32,000 people without power. The storm surge at Ocean City was estimated at 6.6 ft (2 m), which washed over the city's dune system in several locations. However, high waves destroyed the pier that the tidal gauge was on in the city. The combined effects of the nor'easter and the Perfect Storm from the previous October caused significant beach erosion along the Maryland coastline. In Ocean City, some streets lost a significant volume of sand while others gained sand. The cost of the lost beach was estimated between $10–30 million (1992 USD). Low-lying sections and coastal hotels in Ocean City were flooded. West of the city, the storm damaged several summer homes, washing four houses off their foundations. Damage in Ocean City was estimated around $700,000 (1992 USD), much of which to a public golf course.

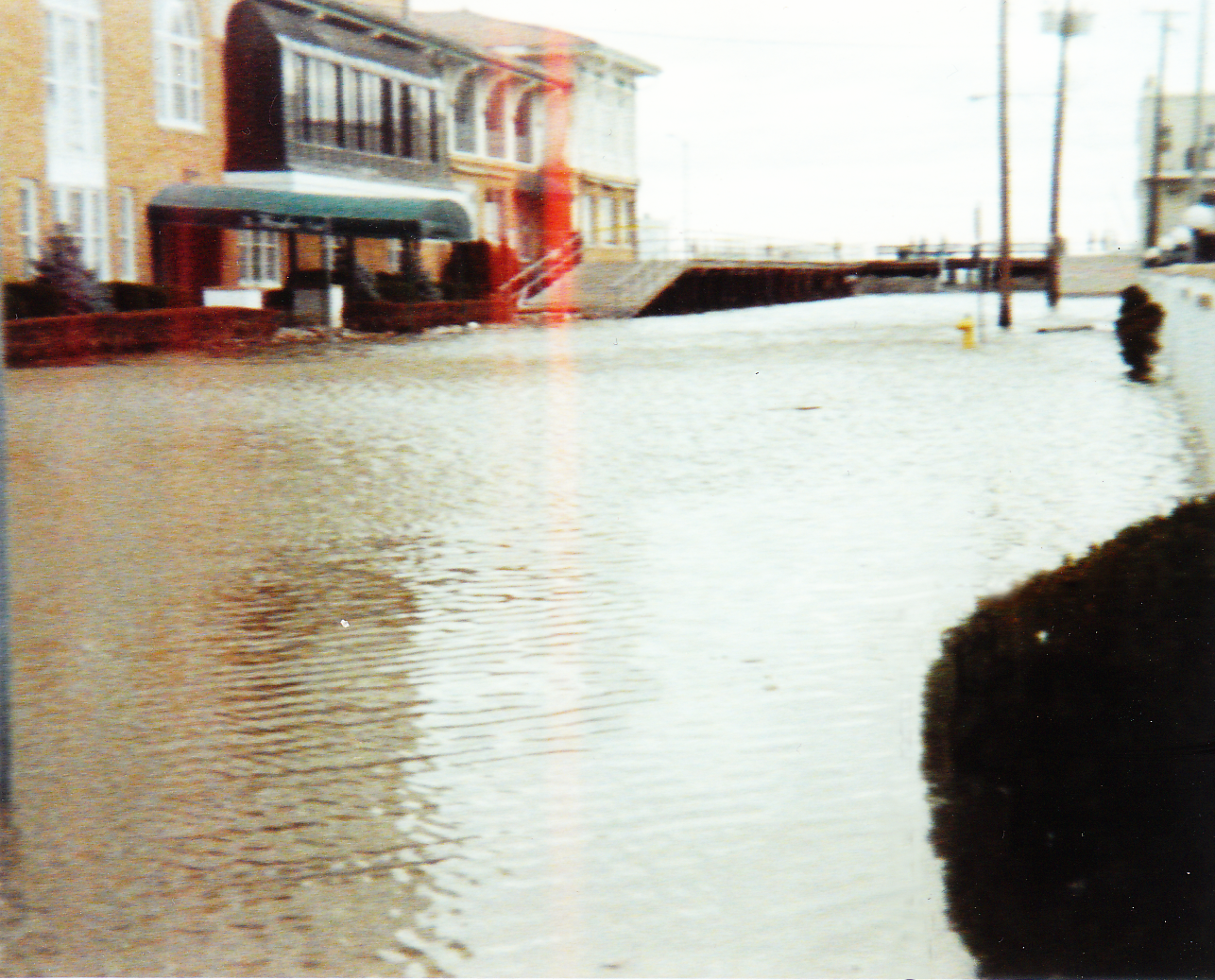
Flooding in Ocean City, New Jersey

The stronger northeast quadrant moved directly over Delaware for one tidal cycle, producing strong east-northeasterly wind gusts that peaked at 83 mph (134 km/h) at a station along the Indian River. The highest tides and flooding along the Delaware coastline were between Bowers and Prime Hook National Wildlife Refuge, where high waves built momentum from the Atlantic Ocean through the Delaware Bay. In Bowers, the tide reached 8.76 ft (2.67 m) along the Murderkill River; the reading was only 2 in (51 mm) less than the record set during the Ash Wednesday Storm of 1962. The high tides flooded marsh vegetation in the town. In Lewes, the highest tide was 7.40 ft (2.26 m), which was the second highest on record; only the 1962 storm was higher, which produced a tide of 8.05 ft (2.45 m). The storm caused significant flooding in Dewey Beach, where a high tide of 9.02 ft (2.75 m) marked the second-highest tide in Delaware history. The saltwater contaminated the town's water supply. The ocean washed over dunes in several locations along Delaware Bay, including in Fowler Beach where flooding reached 20 ft (6.1 m) inland. Near Mispillion Light, the high tides damaged the marina and several nearby buildings. The high tides flooded marshes and low-lying areas throughout the state, which briefly closed portions of state highways 54, 26, and 1. High tides destroyed 11 blocks of the boardwalk in Rehoboth Beach and half of the promenade at Bethany Beach. At nearby South Bethany, high waves destroyed three houses. Along the coast, the storm destroyed 15 houses and damaged 500 others, amounting to over $5 million (1992 USD) in property damage. In addition to the strong winds and high tides, the nor'easter produced light rainfall that did not cause any flooding. The highest total in the state was 1.06 in (27 mm) in Georgetown. Due to the damage, Kent and Sussex counties were declared federal disaster areas on February 6; this allocated federal funding for repairing storm damage. Then-governor Michael Castle activated the state's National Guard to assist clearing highways and prevent civilian access to damaged areas. Due to storm damage, access to Dewey Beach and Rehoboth Beach were restricted to residents.

Further northeast, the nor'easter produced wind gusts of 60 mph (97 km/h), along with high tides; Steel Pier in Atlantic City reported a peak tide of about 8 ft (2.4 m). The ocean flooded under the boardwalk onto adjacent streets, and to the west of the city, flooding closed portions of the White Horse Pike. In Cape May Point, the storm breached dunes that withstood the Perfect Storm, which flooded half of the borough. High tides also caused flooding in nearby Cape May, leaving behind 3 ft (0.91 m) of sand in some locations. There was significant dune damage in Strathmere and Harvey Cedars. The storm damaged the boardwalk in Ocean City, and other coastal towns had damage to bulkheads and sea walls. About 3,000 people were left without power in Somers Point. The storm affected 4,000 houses, of which 76 had severe damage. Overall damage in the state was estimated at $45 million (1992 USD), of which around 30% was public parks and buildings. However, damage was less than that from the Perfect Storm in the previous October. About 80 people evacuated to emergency shelters in South Jersey, and 95 residents of a nursing home in Atlantic City evacuated inland. Due to the storm damage, then-governor Jim Florio declared a state of emergency in Cape May, Atlantic, Ocean, and Monmouth counties. Due to the successive impacts of nor'easters in October and January, the state government provided money to restore beaches.

Further north, LaGuardia Airport outside New York City reported a wind gust of 48 mph (77 km/h). Strong winds on Long Island knocked a tree onto a car, seriously injuring the driver. Freezing rain from the storm caused traffic accidents, killing one person in White Creek. In Oyster Bay, the winds pushed an oil barge into a small boat, causing heavy damage to the smaller vessel. Moisture spread as far north as Maine, where the storm dropped freezing rain; this caused several car accidents that resulted in 11 injuries.

== See also ==
- 1991 Perfect Storm
- December 1992 nor'easter
- 1993 Storm of the Century
