= December 1992 nor'easter =

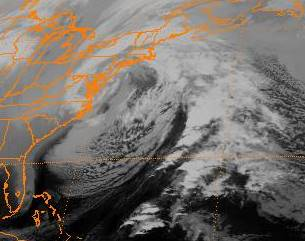
- An Infrared (IR) image of the nor'easter on December 12

Meteorological history
- Formed: December 10, 1992
- Dissipated: After December 12, 1992

Category 2 "Minor" winter storm
- Regional snowfall index: 4.88 (NOAA)
- Highest gusts: 80 mph (130 km/h) at Cape May, New Jersey
- Lowest pressure: 985 mbar (985 hPa)
- Max. snowfall: ~4 ft (1.2 m) in The Berkshires in western Massachusetts

Overall effects
- Fatalities: 4 direct, 19 total
- Damage: $1–2 billion (1992 USD)
- Areas affected: Mid-Atlantic states, New England

The December 1992 nor'easter produced record high tides and snowfall across the northeastern United States. It developed as a low pressure area on December 10 over Virginia, and for two days it remained over the Mid-Atlantic states before moving offshore. In Maryland, the snowfall unofficially reached 48 in (1,200 mm); if verified, the total would have been the highest in the state's history. About 120,000 people were left without power in the state due to high winds. Along the Maryland coast, the storm was less severe than the Perfect Storm in the previous year, although the strongest portion of the storm remained over New Jersey for several days. In the state, winds reached 80 mph (130 km/h) in Cape May, and tides peaked at 10.4 ft (3.2 m) in Perth Amboy. The combination of high tides and 25 ft (7.6 m) waves caused the most significant flooding in the state since the Ash Wednesday Storm of 1962. Several highways and portions of the New York City Subway and Port Authority Trans-Hudson systems were closed due to the storm. Throughout New Jersey, the nor'easter damaged about 3,200 homes and caused an estimated $750 million in damage (1992 USD).

The nor'easter increased tides across the northeastern United States for several days due to its slow movement. In New York City, tides reached 8.04 ft (2.45 m) at Battery Park, which flooded Franklin D. Roosevelt East River Drive. Along Long Island, the nor'easter destroyed over 130 homes and left 454,000 people without power. In New England, 230,684 people lost power during the storm. Five houses were destroyed in Massachusetts, and flooding reached 5 ft (1.5 m) deep in Boston. Further inland, the storm produced significant snowfall, estimated at around 4 ft (1.2 m) in The Berkshires. The high snow totals closed schools for a week in western Massachusetts. Overall, the storm caused between $1–2 billion in damage (1992 USD) and 19 deaths, of which four were directly related to the storm. In March of the following year, the Storm of the Century caused worse damage across a larger region of the eastern United States.

== Meteorological history ==
A storm complex moved eastward from the Texas coast into Georgia on December 9. On December 9, the National Weather Service (NWS) issued a coastal flood watch in anticipation of the developing storm. On December 10, an upper-level trough was located along the East Coast of the United States. At around 1200 UTC that day, cyclogenesis – the development of a low pressure area – occurred over southeastern Virginia. The cyclone moved quickly northward through the Chesapeake Bay until reaching a position just west of Chestertown, Maryland on December 11. By that time, the system had intensified to a pressure of 985 mbar (29.1 inHg), while the parent trough extended from Maryland through the New York metropolitan area to around Cape Cod. On December 11, the NWS issued gale warnings and advised for boats to avoid the ocean. The storm turned to the southeast and briefly stalled near Georgetown, Delaware. This was due to a high pressure area north of Maine halting its motion. The interaction between the two systems produced strong easterly winds from Virginia to New England. The nor'easter finally moved offshore on December 12, and later that day passed to the southeast of Long Island.

== Impact ==
The storm affected a large region of the northeastern United States from West Virginia to Massachusetts with heavy snowfall, sleet, rain, and high winds. The Centers for Disease Control and Prevention attributed four deaths to the nor'easter, but only included those directly related; the agency did not include storm-induced traffic accidents or heart attacks. The National Climatic Data Center reported 19 deaths related to the nor'easter, although news reports shortly after the storm reported 20 deaths. Overall damage was estimated between $1–2 billion (1992 USD), mostly in New England.

The storm's widespread snowfall ranked it as the equivalence of a Category 2, or "significant", on the Regional Snowfall Index scale.

=== Mid-Atlantic ===
In the Eastern Panhandle of West Virginia, the nor'easter dropped over 30 in (760 mm) of snow. Officials restricted travel on roads to emergency vehicles only in the state's two easternmost counties. In the state, the storm left 15,000 people without power. In northern Virginia, 2 ft (0.61 m) of snow stranded 2,500 people in Winchester. In western Maryland, snowfall totals unofficially reached 42 in (1,100 mm) in Garrett County. If verified, the total would have been the highest snowfall amount in the state's history. High winds produced up to 20 ft (6.1 m) snow drifts, which stranded trucks on Interstate 68. High winds knocked down trees and power lines, leaving 120,000 people across the state without power, including some without any heat. At least 10 people required rescue from their homes. In the Washington Metropolitan Area, the mixture of rain and snow caused hundreds of traffic accidents.

The nor'easter struck about 14 months after the 1991 Perfect Storm produced similarly high tides across the region, and only 11 months after another nor'easter in January 1992. In Wilmington, North Carolina, the storm dropped 1.79 in (45 mm) of rainfall, which broke the daily rainfall record set in 1888. High tides damaged much of the dune system along the Assateague Island National Seashore and about a third of the newly installed dunes in Ocean City, Maryland. Along the Maryland coast, the storm dropped heavy rainfall, with a total of 2.90 in (74 mm) in Salisbury; the high rains flooded local streams. At Assateague National Seashore, wind gusts peaked at 54 mph (87 km/h). The storm struck shortly after a full moon, and the combination of high tides and waves breached dunes in some locations. Despite its longevity, the nor'easter was less severe than its predecessors along the Delaware Bay, mostly because the stronger northeast quadrant was over the coastline for one tidal cycle, and the predominant southeast winds were blocked by Cape Henlopen. However, there were still high tides and flooding along the Delaware Bay. In Lewes, the nor'easter produced a high tide of 6.33 ft (1.93 m), which at the time was the seventh highest on record. High tides continued in Delaware until December 15. Several days of high tides caused minor beach erosion and damaged dune systems. In Dewey Beach, there was property damage from coastal flooding. The storm produced significantly more rainfall than the storm in January 1992, including a total of 3.12 in (79 mm) in Wilmington, Delaware. A station in New Castle County reported a record 24‑hour rainfall total of 3.25 in (83 mm). The rains caused flooding and the third highest discharge on record at Duck Creek in Smyrna. Wind in Delaware peaked at 46 mph (74 km/h) at a station along the Indian River. Further north along the Delaware River, a high tide of 7.69 ft (2.34 m) was reported in Philadelphia, Pennsylvania. High winds in the city broke the steeple of a church, and the resulting debris briefly closed the Benjamin Franklin Bridge. Hurricane-force wind gusts left about 160,000 residents without power. Heavy snowfall spread across the state, reaching 37 in (940 mm). State College reported a total of 18.1 in (460 mm), which contributed to its snowiest December on record.

In contrast to Delaware and Maryland, the strong northeast portion of the nor'easter affected New Jersey for several days, producing strong winds and record high tides. Wind gusts reached 80 mph (130 km/h) in Cape May, which were the strongest winds in association with the storm. Sustained winds were around 30 mph (48 km/h) in the region. High winds in Atlantic City destroyed the windows of storefronts. Along the Jersey coast, the nor'easter produced waves of up to 25 ft (7.6 m) in height. About 25 mi (40 km) offshore Long Branch, waves reached heights of 44 ft (13 m). In South Jersey, the storm surge struck the coast near low tide, which restricted flooding. The highest tide in South Jersey was 7.89 ft (2.40 m) in Ocean City, which broke the previous record of 7.53 ft (2.30 m) set in 1984. Further north, the surge coincided with several days of high tides and a lunar tide, causing significant flooding and beach erosion. The highest tide was 10.4 ft (3.2 m) in Perth Amboy along the Raritan River, which broke the record set in 1960. In many locations, the storm produced the highest tides since the Ash Wednesday Storm of 1962. The storm also dropped rainfall across the state, peaking at 3.80 in (97 mm) in Morristown, along with gusts peaking at 58 mph (93 km/h) at Morristown Municipal Airport. The rainfall caused higher discharge rates along rivers. The storm also produced high snowfall totals, including 14 in (360 mm) in Sussex County. Throughout the coastline, the cost to replace the lost beach from erosion was estimated at $300 million (1992 USD).

Most of the impact in New Jersey was from the high tides, which caused the worst flooding in 30 years in some locations. In Hoboken, high tides flooded portions of the New York City Subway and Port Authority Trans-Hudson systems, leaving them closed for a few days. High tides destroyed portions of the boardwalks in Bradley Beach and Belmar, and also destroyed a century-old fishing pier in Ocean Grove. Flooding closed portions of roads across North Jersey, including the Garden State Parkway near Cheesequake State Park and six state highways. At Newark International Airport, dozens of flights were canceled. The storm left 102,000 customers of Jersey Central Power & Light without power. Damage to short circuits caused house fires in Monmouth County. Damage was heaviest near Raritan, Newark, and Sandy Hook along Raritan Bay. High winds in Jersey City destroyed the roof of an apartment; the debris struck and killed a woman walking along a nearby sidewalk. Throughout the state, the nor'easter damaged about 3,200 homes, primarily in Monmouth and Ocean counties, and caused an estimated $750 million in damage (1992 USD). Then-governor Jim Florio declared a state of emergency and activated the New Jersey National Guard. About 19,000 people were evacuated in six towns in Monmouth County. Statewide, about 2,000 people in 20 towns had to be evacuated by helicopter or National Guard truck. The American Red Cross opened at least 30 shelters across the state, housing over 5,000 people affected by floods or lack of heat. Damage in the state was less than the nor'easter of 1962 due to 30 years of disaster mitigation, including beach replenishment, dune construction, and improved building codes.

=== New York and New England ===
Before the storm's circulation passed the New York area, its associated trough produced sustained easterly winds of 50 mph (80 km/h) along Long Island. Wind gusts reached 77 mph (124 km/h) at LaGuardia Airport. The strong easterly winds produced high tides in the region that increased gradually after three consecutive tidal cycles; this was due to the nor'easter's slow movement. There was a storm surge of about 3 ft (1 m) at Battery Park at the southern end of Manhattan. The same station reported a high tide of 8.04 ft (2.45 m) above sea level, which was high enough to surpass the sea walls for a few hours. The ensuing flooding submerged portions of Franklin D. Roosevelt East River Drive to about 4 ft (1.5 m) deep. At least 50 cars were stuck, and some drivers required rescue. Low-lying neighborhoods of New York City were also flooded. High waves canceled Staten Island Ferry service. A power outage closed the New York City Subway system for about five hours. The highest tide in Long Island was 11.27 ft (3.44 m) at Willets Point, Queens. The tides and flooding decreased after the winds shifted to the north, ending on December 14. High tides canceled ferry service to Fire Island, and the only bridge onto the island was closed to all but emergency personnel and homeowners. High waves washed away dunes and severely eroded beaches along the island, destroying over 100 summer homes. On nearby Westhampton Beach, 30 homes were destroyed, and about 100 houses were isolated due to two new inlets created during the storm. Flooding closed all three bridges connecting Long Beach to the mainland. Flooding up to 8 ft (2.4 m) forced about 3,000 people to evacuate from one village on northern Long Island. About 700 homes were damaged in Bayville along the north coast. High winds downed trees and power lines, leaving more than 454,000 Long Island Lighting Company customers without power. In Mamaroneck to the northeast of New York City, a man drowned after being swept away by floodwaters. In the Albany area, where the storm was known as the Downslope Nor'easter, there was little snow accumulation during the storm's closest approach due to above freezing temperatures. After the storm moved by the region and the winds shifted to the north, about 6 in (150 mm) fell in the city. To the west of Albany in the Helderberg Escarpment and the Catskill Mountains, snowfall totals reached 39 in (990 mm). Heavy snowfall spread across the state, including a total of 14 in (360 mm) in Niagara Falls.

In Connecticut, local TV stations named the storm Beth. Across the region, the Northeast Utilities power company reported that 230,684 customers lost electricity during the storm, although all outages were restored within three days. In Connecticut, the nor'easter produced a storm surge of about 3 ft (1 m), and a high tide of 7.2 ft (2.2 m) was reported in Bridgeport. This was the highest tide since Hurricane Carol in 1954. The rising tides killed one man in the state, and there was also one fatality in neighboring Rhode Island. Along Cape Cod, 15 ft (4.6 m) waves eroded beaches, and evacuations were recommended in two cities. The storm destroyed severely damaged two houses and destroyed six houses on Nantucket and one in Plymouth. During the storm, more than 20 pilot whales were beached along the cape, of which seven died. Boston reported a peak tide of 9.35 ft (2.85 m), which was 1.05 ft (0.32 m) less than the record set in 1978. The high tides caused up to 5 ft (1.5 m) of flooding. The nor'easter produced 27 in (690 mm) of snowfall in a 24 period to the west of the city. Further west, snowfall totals reached around 4 ft (1.2 m) in The Berkshires, which created 10 ft (3.0 m) snow drifts. The high accumulations closed schools for a week in the Berkshires, and the cities required National Guard assistance to remove the snow. To the west of the Berkshires, strong east winds prevented significant snow accumulation in valleys. High tides extended as far north as Portland, Maine, which reported a peak of 7.71 ft (2.35 m).

== Aftermath ==
On December 17, President George H. W. Bush declared three Connecticut counties as disaster areas. The next day, the president declared 12 New Jersey counties as disaster areas, including all of the counties along the Atlantic coast. The declaration allowed for $46 million in relief for public damages and $265 million for insured damage in the state. On December 21, the president declared 9 Massachusetts counties and 5 New York counties as disaster areas. On January 15, 1993, Sussex County, Delaware was also declared a disaster area. Across the nor'easter's path, 25,142 people received assistance from Federal Emergency Management Agency, equating to $346,150,356 in federal aid. Only three months after the nor'easter struck, another nor'easter caused more severe damage across a larger region of the eastern United States. The March nor'easter, known as the Storm of the Century, killed 310 people and left over $1.5 billion in damage (1993 USD).

== See also ==
- 1991 Perfect Storm
- January 1992 nor'easter
- 1993 Storm of the Century
- Hurricane Sandy
