= Long Beach Barrier Island =

Island in New York, United States

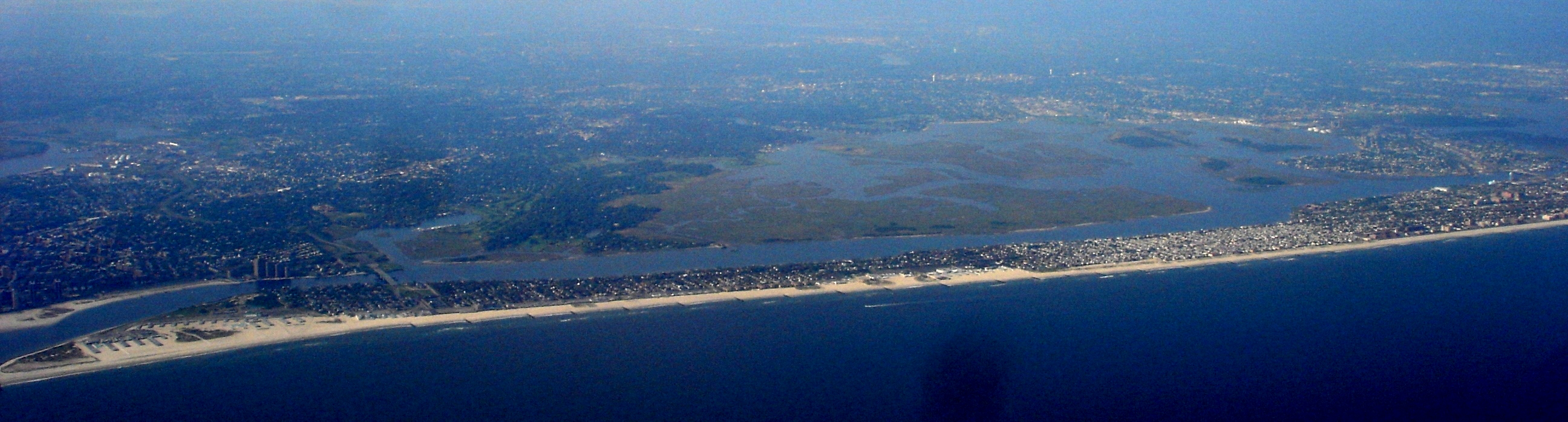
Long Beach Barrier Island in May 2007, looking north

Long Beach Barrier Island is one of the outer barrier islands off the south coast of Long Island, New York, United States. Long Beach is the westernmost of these barrier islands, fronting on Reynolds Channel to the north and the Atlantic Ocean to the south.

== History ==
The first inhabitants on the Long Beach Barrier Island were the Rockaway Indians; the island was sold to the New Netherland colonists in 1643. Local Long Island baymen and farmers used the island for fishing and harvesting salt hay; no people lived on the island year round for more than two centuries. The United States Congress established a lifesaving station in 1849, a dozen years after 62 people died when the barque Mexico carrying Irish immigrants to New York ran ashore on New Year's Day.

Development began on the island as a resort and was organized by Austin Corbin, a builder from Brooklyn, New York. Austin Corbin formed a partnership with the Long Island Rail Road to finance the New York and Long Beach Railroad Company which laid tracks from Lynbrook to Long Beach in 1880. The company also opened the 1,100-foot-long (340 m) Long Beach Hotel, at the time the largest in the world. The railroad brought 300,000 visitors the first season. By the next spring, tracks had been laid almost the full length of the Long Beach Island, but after repeated winter storm washouts they were removed in 1894.

== Communities ==
=== Cities ===
- Long Beach
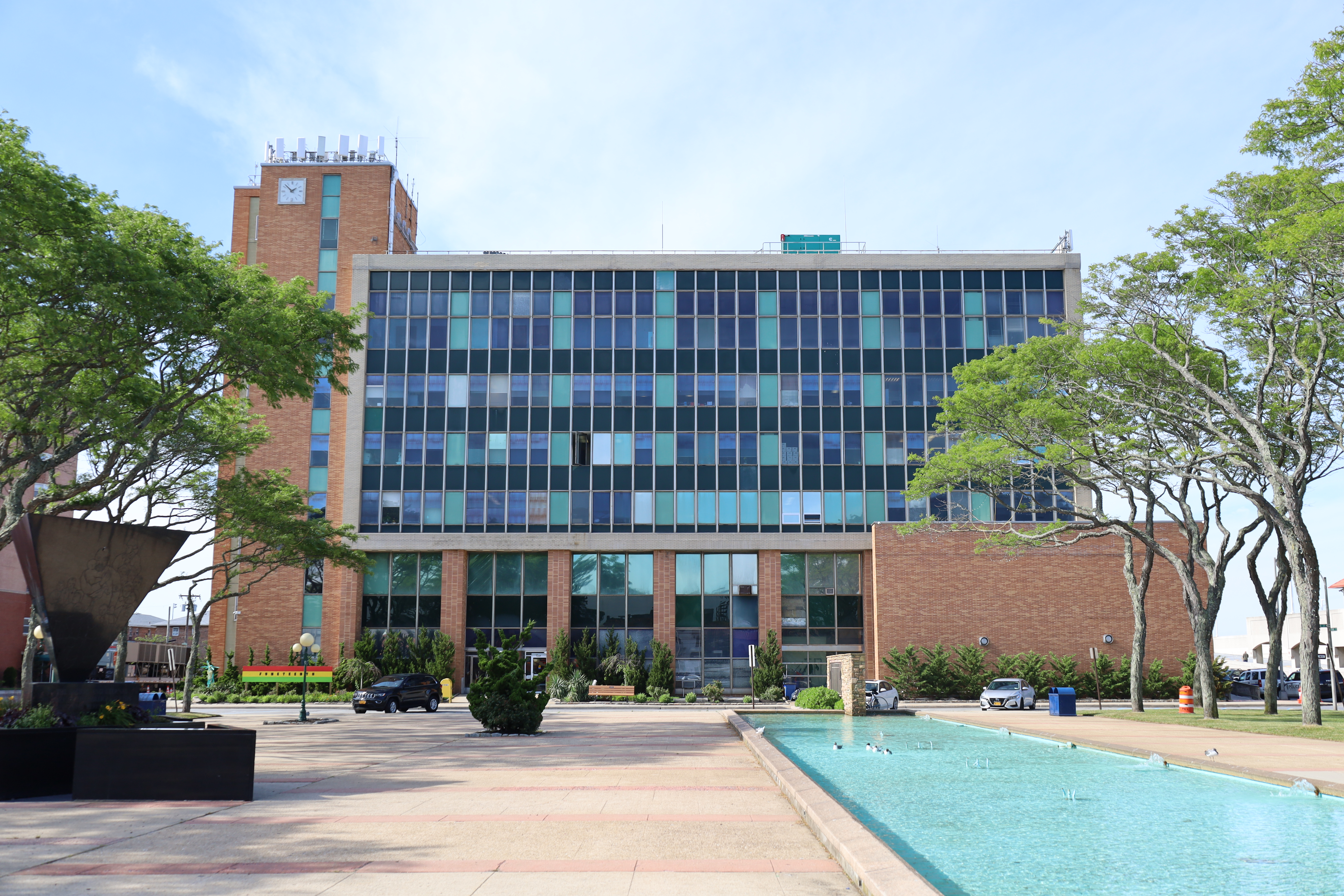
  Long Beach City Hall in June 2021

=== Villages ===
- Atlantic Beach

=== Hamlets ===
- East Atlantic Beach
- Lido Beach
- Point Lookout

== Transportation ==
=== Road ===
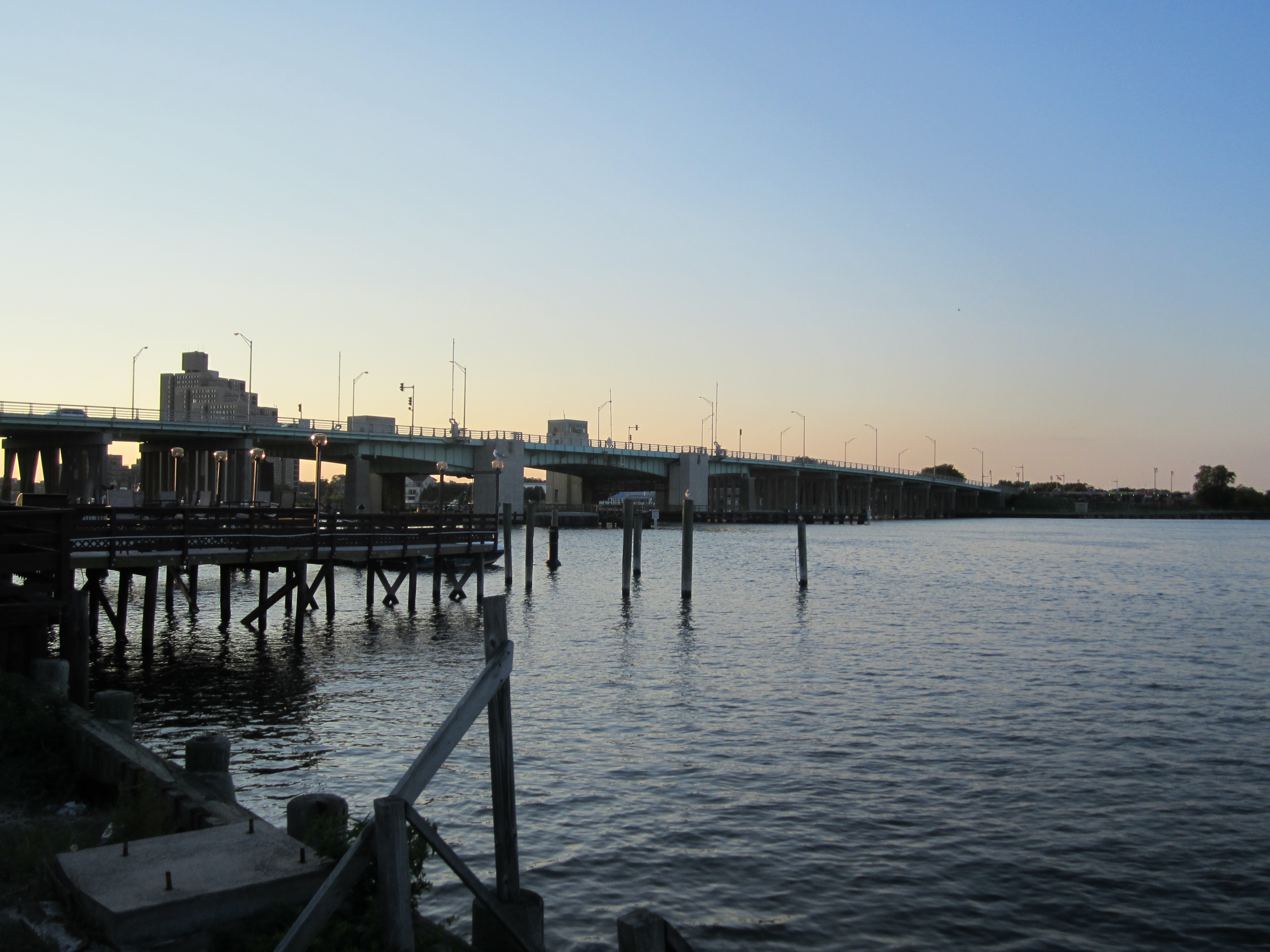
The Atlantic Beach Bridge in 2012

The Long Beach Bridge connects to Island Park, the Atlantic Beach Bridge connects to Lawrence on the mainland of Long Island, and the Loop Parkway bridge connects Lido Beach to the Meadowbrook State Parkway.

=== Rail ===
The Long Island Rail Road's Long Beach Branch terminates at the Long Beach station on the island.

=== Bus ===
Bus services are provided by Nassau Inter-County Express (NICE) and Long Beach Bus.

== See also ==
- Jones Beach Island
- Fire Island
