= Lawrence Public Schools (New York) =

School district in Long Island, New York, United States

Lawrence Union Free School District

Location
- Nassau County, New York United States

District information
- Type: Public
- Motto: Success is within the reach of each and every learner.
- Grades: PK–12
- Established: January 24, 1891
- Superintendent: Dr. Ann Pedersen Ed.D
- Asst. superintendent(s): Mr. Jeremy Feder
- School board: Mr. Murray Forman, President Dr. Asher Mansdorf, Vice President Dr. David Sussman, Trustee Mr. Heshy Blachorsky, Trustee Mr. Abel Feldhamer, Trustee Mr. Michael Hatten, Trustee Mrs. Tova Plaut, Trustee
- Schools: 5
- Budget: $100,783,090 (2017–18)
- NCES District ID: 3616830

Students and staff
- Students: 2,486 (2017–2018)
- Teachers: 208.40 (2017–2018)
- Student–teacher ratio: 11.93
- District mascot: Golden Tornadoes

Other information
- Website: www.lawrence.org

The Lawrence Public Schools Union Free School District 15 is a comprehensive community public school district, serving students in pre-kindergarten through twelfth grade, located in the southwest section of Nassau County, New York, and borders the New York City borough of Queens.

Communities in the district include Lawrence, Cedarhurst, Inwood, and Atlantic Beach. It also includes sections of the municipality of Woodsburgh, as well as the census-designated places of Woodmere and East Atlantic Beach. It also includes a part of North Woodmere.

== Schools ==
The district consists of the following schools:

- Lawrence Early Childhood Center at #4 School
- Lawrence Number 2 School (grades 1–3)
- Lawrence Elementary at The Broadway Campus (grades 4-6)
- Lawrence Middle School at The Broadway Campus (grades 7-8)
- Lawrence High School (grades 9-12)

== Demographics ==
On December 3, 2006, Newsday reported that of 3,692 students, 52.9% were white, 16.1% were black, 25.5% were Hispanic and 5.6% were "other."

== Board of Trustees ==
- Murray Forman – Board of Education president
- Asher Mansdorf – Board of Education vice president
- David Sussman – Board of Education trustee
- Heshy Blachorsky – Board of Education trustee
- Abel Feldhamer – Board of Education trustee
- Michael Hatten – Board of Education trustee
- Mrs. Tova Plaut – Board of Education trustee
- Mrs. Tova Rosenfeld – Board of Education trustee

== Notable alumni ==
- Lyle Alzado (1949–1992), NFL defensive tackle for Oakland Raiders and Denver Broncos
- Mickey Hart (born 1943), Grateful Dead percussionist
- Alan Kalter, announcer/on-camera personality, Late Show with David Letterman
- Aline Kominsky-Crumb, comics artist
- Peggy Lipton (born 1946), actress
- Steve Madden (born 1958), shoe designer
- Ira Magaziner (born 1947, class of 1965), aide to President Bill Clinton
- Shane Olivea (born 1981), NFL offensive tackle for San Diego Chargers
- Evan Roberts (born 1983), sports radio personality who co-hosts the Joe & Evan show
- Michael Scarola, stage director for the New York City Opera, Lincoln Center
