= East Atlantic Beach, New York =

- Hamlet and census-designated place
- Location in Nassau County and the state of New York

- Location within the state of New York
- Coordinates: 40°35′17″N 73°42′21″W
- Country: United States
- State: New York
- County: Nassau
- Town: Hempstead

Area
  - Total: 0.68 sq mi (1.77 km^{2})
  - Land: 0.31 sq mi (0.81 km^{2})
  - Water: 0.37 sq mi (0.96 km^{2})
- Elevation: 69 ft (21 m)

Population (2020)
  - Total: 2,101
  - Density: 6,732.7/sq mi (2,599.51/km^{2})
- Time zone: UTC-5 (Eastern (EST))
  - Summer (DST): UTC-4 (EDT)
- ZIP Codes: 11561 (East Atlantic Beach); 11509 (Atlantic Beach)
- Area codes: 516, 363
- FIPS code: 36-21578
- GNIS feature ID: 1852897

East Atlantic Beach is a hamlet and census-designated place (CDP) located on the Long Beach Barrier Island in Nassau County, New York, United States. The population was 2,101 at the time of the 2020 census.

The unincorporated hamlet is governed by the Town of Hempstead – one of three towns in Nassau County.

== Geography ==
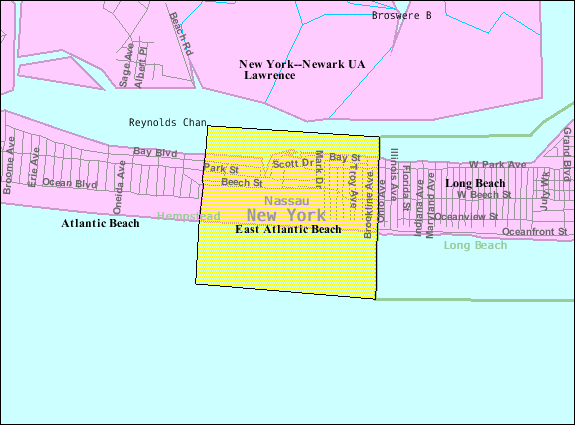
U.S. Census map of East Atlantic Beach

According to the United States Census Bureau, the CDP has a total area of 0.7 square miles (1.8 km^{2}), of which 0.3 square miles (0.78 km^{2}) is land and 0.4 square miles (1.0 km^{2}) – or 55.88% – is water.

The hamlet is one of five municipalities located on Long Beach Barrier Island – a barrier island lying just south of Long Island. It is surrounded by the Atlantic Ocean to the south, Reynolds Channel on the north, the Village of Atlantic Beach to the west, and the City of Long Beach to the east.

== Demographics ==
Historical population
Census	Pop.	Note	%±
2000	2,257		—
2010	2,049		−9.2%
2020	2,101		2.5%
U.S. Decennial Census

=== 2020 census ===
As of the 2020 census, East Atlantic Beach had a population of 2,101. The median age was 49.8 years. 12.3% of residents were under the age of 18 and 22.7% of residents were 65 years of age or older. For every 100 females there were 102.6 males, and for every 100 females age 18 and over there were 101.9 males age 18 and over.

100.0% of residents lived in urban areas, while 0.0% lived in rural areas.

There were 860 households in East Atlantic Beach, of which 19.8% had children under the age of 18 living in them. Of all households, 50.3% were married-couple households, 20.1% were households with a male householder and no spouse or partner present, and 24.3% were households with a female householder and no spouse or partner present. About 26.1% of all households were made up of individuals and 12.6% had someone living alone who was 65 years of age or older.

There were 994 housing units, of which 13.5% were vacant. The homeowner vacancy rate was 0.3% and the rental vacancy rate was 3.5%.

Racial composition as of the 2020 census
Race	Number	Percent
White	1,939	92.3%
Black or African American	8	0.4%
American Indian and Alaska Native	0	0.0%
Asian	19	0.9%
Native Hawaiian and Other Pacific Islander	0	0.0%
Some other race	32	1.5%
Two or more races	103	4.9%
Hispanic or Latino (of any race)	128	6.1%

=== 2000 census ===
As of the census of 2000, there were 2,257 people, 887 households, and 587 families residing in the CDP. The population density was 7,544.4 inhabitants per square mile (2,912.9/km^{2}). There were 965 housing units at an average density of 3,225.7 per square mile (1,245.4/km^{2}). The racial makeup of the CDP was 97.25% White, 0.31% African American, 0.13% Native American, 0.89% Asian, 0.66% from other races, and 0.75% from two or more races. Hispanic or Latino of any race were 3.54% of the population.

There were 887 households, out of which 28.7% had children under the age of 18 living with them, 53.2% were married couples living together, 9.1% had a female householder with no husband present, and 33.8% were non-families. 24.7% of all households were made up of individuals, and 6.5% had someone living alone who was 65 years of age or older. The average household size was 2.54 and the average family size was 3.07.

In the CDP, the population was spread out, with 21.4% under the age of 18, 5.8% from 18 to 24, 32.5% from 25 to 44, 27.1% from 45 to 64, and 13.2% who were 65 years of age or older. The median age was 40 years. For every 100 females, there were 98.5 males. For every 100 females age 18 and over, there were 99.3 males.

The median income for a household in the CDP was $71,667, and the median income for a family was $86,356. Males had a median income of $60,871 versus $38,125 for females. The per capita income for the CDP was $34,429. None of the families and 1.6% of the population were living below the poverty line, including no under eighteens and 2.4% of those over 64.

== Government ==
Law enforcement for East Atlantic Beach is provided by the 4th Precinct of the Nassau County Police Department.

The East Atlantic Beach Fire District is responsible for providing fire and emergency ambulance services. Since the district does not maintain its own fire department or ambulance service, the district contracts with the neighboring Long Beach Fire Department.

U.S. Mail Service is provided by the Long Beach Post Office.

== Parks and recreation ==
=== East Atlantic Beach Park District ===
The East Atlantic Beach Park District is a town-run special park district located within and operated by the Town of Hempstead, in Nassau County, New York, United States. It is responsible for the financing, maintenance, improvement, and operation of all the town-owned parks within its boundaries for residents of the district. It covers roughly the eastern third of the East Atlantic Beach CDP.

All facilities operated by the East Atlantic Beach Park District are open exclusively to residents of the district.

==== East Atlantic Beach Park ====
East Atlantic Beach Park is a beach and park operated by the East Atlantic Beach Park District. It stretches along the entire ocean-facing length of the hamlet. It is staffed by Town of Hempstead lifeguards during the summer. It also contains basketball courts and the Brookline Avenue Playground. It includes over 1,000 feet (300 m) of beachfront along the Atlantic Ocean.

Although there is no fee, only residents of the hamlet residing within the East Atlantic Beach Park District are able to obtain seasonal beach passes for admittance.

==== Veterans Memorial Park ====
Veterans Memorial Park (formerly known as Trenton Avenue Park) – is a park located operated by the East Atlantic Beach Park District, located off Trenton Avenue within East Atlantic Beach. It contains various sporting facilities and a playground.

Only residents of the East Atlantic Beach Park District are able to use the park.

=== Atlantic Beach Estates Park District ===
The Atlantic Beach Estates Park District is a town-run special park district located within and operated by the Town of Hempstead, in Nassau County, New York, United States. It is responsible for the financing, maintenance, improvement, and operation of the Atlantic Beach Estates Club in the adjacent village, Atlantic Beach; the Atlantic Beach Estates Club is open exclusively to the residents of the district, despite being within the boundaries of the Incorporated Village of Atlantic Beach.

The park district covers roughly the western two-thirds of the East Atlantic Beach CDP.

== Education ==
The CDP is divided between Lawrence Public Schools and Long Beach City School District. The comprehensive high school of the former is Lawrence High School.

== See also ==
- Atlantic Beach, New York
- Lido Beach, New York
