= Bayville Bridge =

Bridge in Nassau County, New York

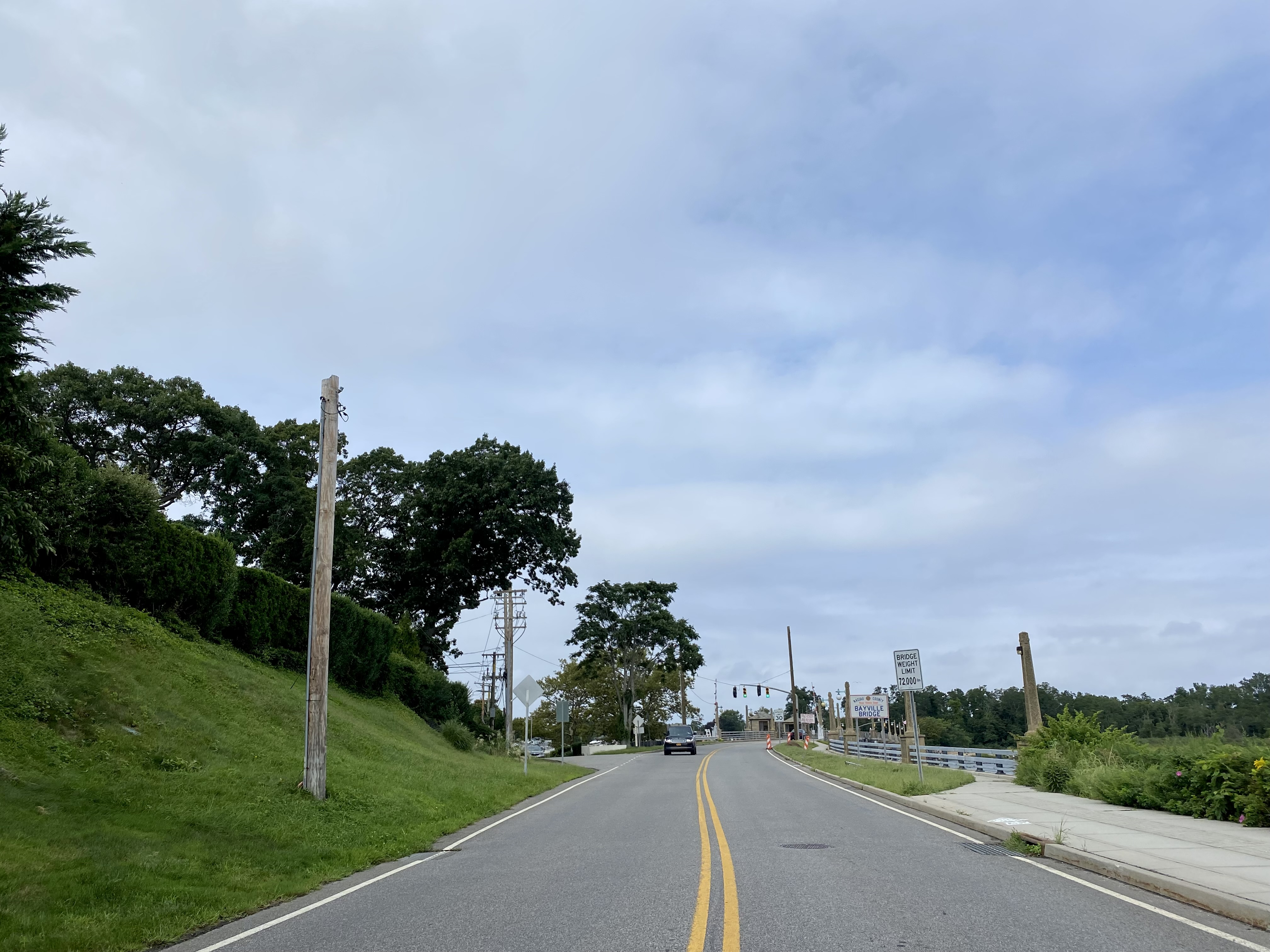
- The southern approach to the Bayville Bridge on August 29, 2021.
- Coordinates: 40°54′09.8″N 73°32′55.3″W
- Carries: 2 lanes of Ludlam Avenue/West Shore Road and two sidewalks
- Crosses: Mill Neck Creek/Oyster Bay Harbor
- Official name: Bayville Bridge
- Owner: Nassau County, New York
- Maintained by: Nassau County Department of Public Works

Characteristics
- Design: Bascule
- Material: Steel
- Total length: 541 feet (165 m)

History
- Opened: 1938 (current bridge)

Statistics
- Daily traffic: 9,128 (as of 2016)

Location
- Interactive map of Bayville Bridge

The Bayville Bridge is a 541-foot (165 m) long drawbridge carrying Ludlam Avenue/West Shore Road, connecting the villages of Bayville and Mill Neck in Nassau County, on Long Island, New York, United States, while passing over Mill Neck Creek and Oyster Bay Harbor.

The bridge is owned and maintained by Nassau County, and is a major landmark and tourist attraction within Mill Neck and Bayville.

== History ==
=== Current bridge ===
The current Bayville Bridge was built in 1938, replacing an earlier span which had been deemed to be "inadequate" in a survey, showing an increase in vehicular traffic; it is the fourth bridge in this location.

The bridge suffered damage from Hurricane Sandy in 2012, and repairs were completed in 2013.

As of 2016, the bridge carried an average of 9,128 vehicles per day.

In 2020, the bridge underwent an extensive rehabilitation project.

=== Previous bridges ===
The first bridge in this location opened in 1898, and enabled a quicker route into Bayville, as it eliminated the need to travel around the shore of Mill Neck Creek or take a boat across the waterway.

Made of wood, the original drawbridge was replaced in 1904 with a newer drawbridge made of wood planks and steel rails; the original bridge had proved to be unfit for heavy loads when a man named Harry West realized after safely ashore that part of the bridge had collapsed after he carried a heavy load over the bridge.

The second drawbridge was replaced in 1922 with a third bridge, which opened to much fanfare. Despite common belief that it would last "forever," it was replaced with the current span in 1938.

== See also ==
- Atlantic Beach Bridge – Another drawbridge in Nassau County.
