= Michael Valente =

United States Army Medal of Honor recipient (1895–1976)

- Private First Class Michael Valente
- Born: February 5, 1895; Cassino, Italy
- Died: January 10, 1976 (aged 80); Farmingdale, New York, US
- Burial place: Long Island National Cemetery
- Military career
- Allegiance: United States
- Branch: United States Army
- Service years: 1917–1919
- Rank: Private First Class
- Units: 107th Infantry Regiment, 27th Division
- Conflicts: World War I
- Awards: Medal of Honor; Purple Heart

Michael Valente (February 5, 1895 – January 10, 1976) was an Italian-born American soldier who served the United States Army in World War I. He received the United States military's highest decoration – the Medal of Honor – for his actions in France on September 29, 1918.

== Biography ==
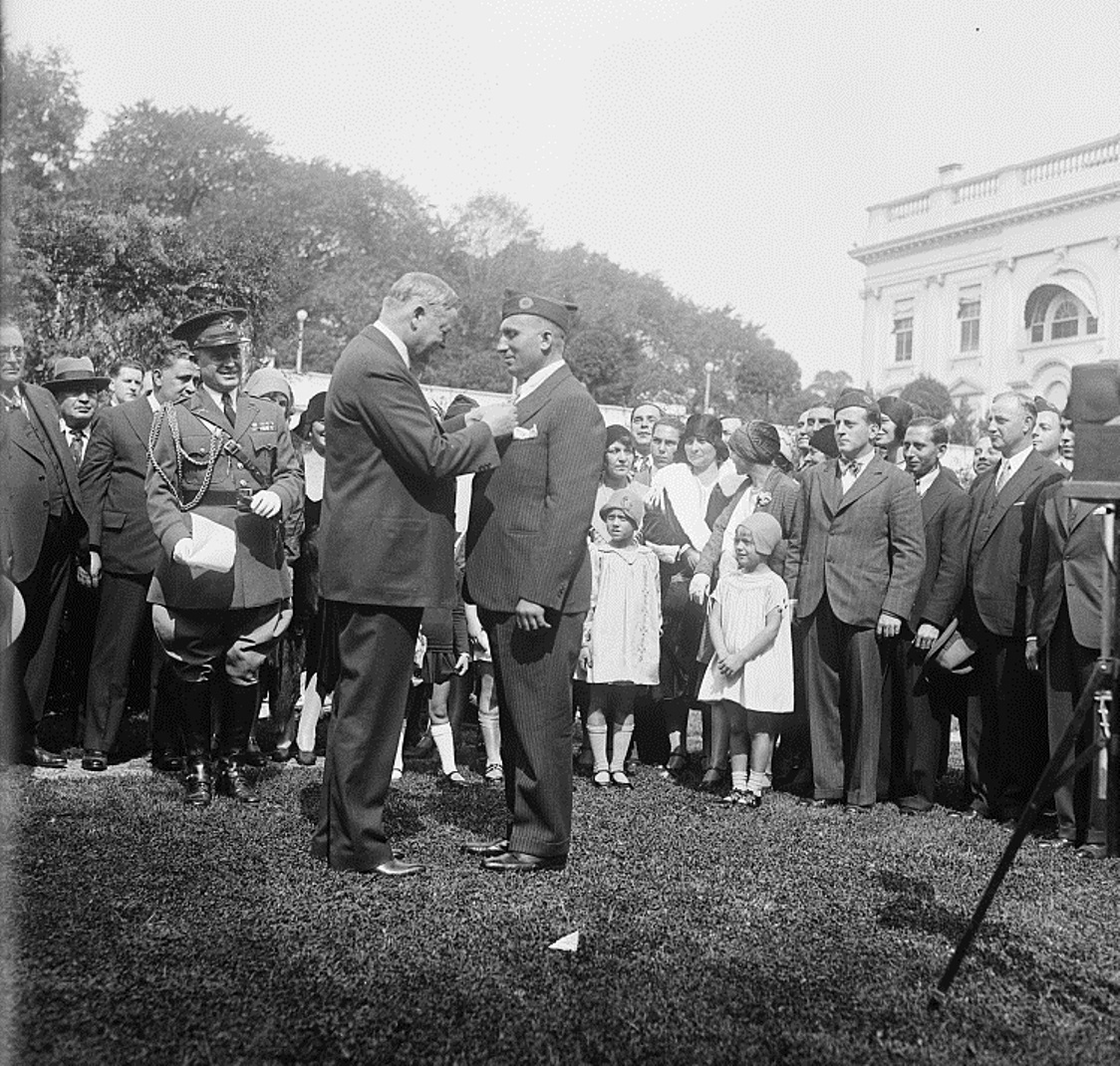
Original caption: President Hoover presents Congressional Medal of Honor to World War hero. Michael Valente, formerly Private, Company D, 107th Infantry, 27th Division during the World War, receiving from President Hoover the Congressional Medal of Honor at the White House today. Valente receives the medal for bravery while in Hindenberg Line during the World War. He enlisted at Ogdensburg, N.Y., but is now a resident of Long Beach, N.Y.

Born on February 5, 1895 in Cassino, Italy, Valente immigrated to the United States and joined the Army in 1917 from Ogdensburg, New York. By September 29, 1918, he was serving in France as a private with Company D of the 107th Infantry Regiment, 27th Division. On that day, his unit was participating in an assault on the Hindenburg Line east of Ronssoy when it was held up by intense machine gun fire. With another man, Valente voluntarily moved forward and silenced two machine gun nests, attacked a trench, killed five Germans, and captured 21 others before being wounded. Over a decade later, on September 27, 1929, President Herbert C. Hoover awarded Valente the Medal of Honor during a ceremony on the White House lawn.

Valente is buried at Long Island National Cemetery in Farmingdale, New York.

=== Medal of Honor Citation ===
Rank and organization: Private, U.S. Army, Company D, 107th Infantry, 27th Division. Place and date: East of Ronssoy, France; September 29, 1918. Entered service at: Ogdensburg, New York. Born: February 5, 1895; Cassino, Italy. General Orders: War Department, General Orders No. 16 (September 26, 1929).

Citation:

Finding the advance of his organization held up by a withering enemy machinegun fire, Private Valente volunteered to go forward. With utter disregard of his own personal danger, accompanied by another soldier, Private Valente rushed forward through an intense machinegun fire directly upon the enemy nest, killing two and capturing five of the enemy and silencing the gun. Discovering another machinegun nest close by which was pouring a deadly fire on the American forces, preventing their advance, Private Valente and his companion charged upon this strong point, killing the gunner and putting this machinegun out of action. Without hesitation they jumped into the enemy's trench, killed two and captured 16 German soldiers. Private Valente was later wounded and sent to the rear.

=== British Military Medal Citation ===
MICHAEL VALENTE, Pvt., Co. D.
British Military Medal

Pvt. Michael Valente, Co. D, 107th Inf., when this company's advance on the Knoll, in the Hindenburg Line near Ronssoy, September 29, 1918, was checked, went forward in utter disregard of personal danger to himself, and attacked two machine gun nests that were causing trouble. He made three successful raids upon the position, in the first raid taking 7 prisoners and sending them to the rear. Going back again, with nothing but a "potato masher," he charged this same position, compelling 5 more of the enemy to surrender, and sent them to the rear. In the meantime the enemy had placed a sniper at the end of the trench which Pvt. Valente had to use. Knowing this, he worked his way up another trench and patiently waited for his shot. The enemy, thinking that everything was clear, exposed himself and was killed by Pvt. Valente with rifle fire. The way clear, he returned to the machine gun nest, rushed in and took 5 more prisoners. In charging this position, he forced numbers of Germans to retreat over the top, where they were taken care of by our rifle fire. This soldier was later wounded and evacuated. By his courage and utter disregard for personal safety, he set a fine example to his comrades.

== Military Awards ==
Valente's military decorations and awards include:

1st row	Medal of Honor		
2nd row	Purple Heart	World War I Victory Medal w/three bronze service stars to denote credit for the Somme Offensive, Ypres-Lys and Defensive Sector battle clasps.	Military Medal (Great Britain)

== See also ==
- List of Medal of Honor recipients for World War I
