= Marc Straus =

American oncologist

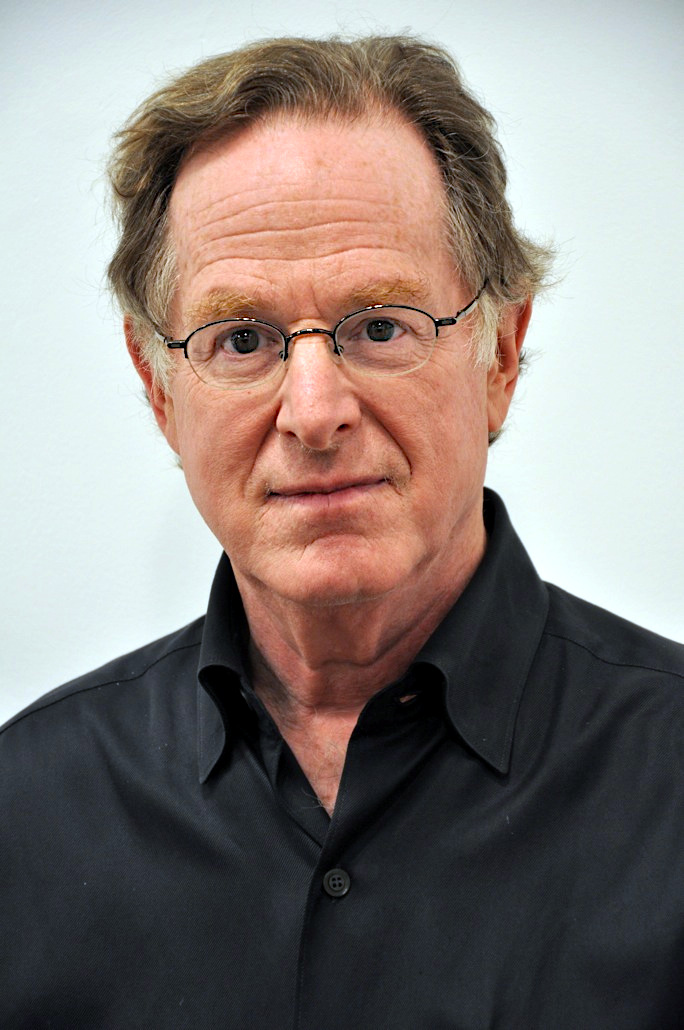
- Born: Marc Joshua Straus; New York City
- Education: BA – Franklin & Marshall College, MD – SUNY Downstate Medical Center
- Occupations: Art collector and Gallery Owner, Oncologist, poet
- Spouse: Livia Straus

Marc Straus is an American oncologist, art collector, poet, and writer. He is the author of more than 40 scientific papers on the treatment of various types of cancer. Straus was among the first oncologists to introduce the use of continuous infusion for the delivery of chemotherapy, a practice that has since become standard.

Straus is the founder of Hudson Valley MOCA and the Marc Straus Gallery in New York City.

== Early life and education ==
Straus was raised in Long Island and in Brooklyn. His father was an orphaned immigrant who came to the United States at age 15 and later owned a textile business on Manhattan’s Lower East Side. Growing up, Straus worked in the shop on Sundays.

Straus received a B.A. degree from Franklin & Marshall College in 1964 and an M.D. from State University of New York Downstate Medical Center in 1968. He interned at Kings County Hospital in Brooklyn in 1968–69.

From 1969 to 1971, Straus was a staff associate at the National Cancer Institute. He was a resident at Barnes Hospital in St. Louis from 1971–72.

== Medical career ==
Straus served as a senior cancer research internist at the National Cancer Institute Veteran’s Administration (NCI-VA) Medical Oncology Branch from 1972 to 1974. During this period, he also served as head of the NCI-VA Cell Kinetics Laboratory, as NCI-VA Director of Medical Education, and as Executive Officer of the NCI Work Group for Therapy of Lung Cancer. At the National Cancer Institute, he worked on cancer drug studies in mice which established optimal ways of combining different drugs to improve outcomes. During this time, he had a number of studies published in cancer research journals.

In 1973, he was recruited as Chief of Oncology and Associate Professor of Medicine at Boston University Medical Center where his clinical and research work focused primarily on breast and lung cancers. While at BU, Straus was among the recipients of the Ten Outstanding Young Leaders Award from the Greater Boston Chamber of Commerce.

After leaving BU in 1978, Straus took up posts at the Westchester County Medical Center where he continued his clinical and laboratory research work. From 1978 to 1982, he was Professor of Medicine and Chief of Neoplastic Diseases at the New York Medical College.

Straus is the author of more than 40 peer-reviewed and published scientific papers pertaining to the treatment of cancer.

He is a fellow of the American College of Physicians.

== Healthcare business ventures ==
From 1982 to 2008, he headed Access Medical Group, a multi-specialty group in the Hudson Valley, New York, which had 36 doctors. In 1997, he founded a medical management company that managed 300 doctors in New York state.

In 1982, Straus started CarePlus, a publicly trade home nutrition company. In 1983, he founded Medical Registry Services, a software company that provides cancer registry software support for hospitals. In 2008 he and his son, Ari, founded MDINR, a software company that supported doctors treating patients with the anti-coagulant, Coumadin, also sold under the brand name Warfarin.

Straus was president of The Oxford Medical Group, P.C. and chief executive officer and chair of MDx Med-Care.

== Writing career ==
In 1991, Straus took a poetry workshop at the 92nd Street Y in New York City. He was later awarded a writing residency at Yaddo, an artists' community located on a 400-acre estate in Saratoga Springs, New York. In 1999, Straus was awarded the Robert Penn Warren Award Lecture in the Humanities from Yale University Medical School.

Straus left his full-time medical practice in 2006 and began focusing on his poetry. By 2009, he had published more than 100 poems and three books. His poems have been published in more than 100 journals including The Kenyon Review, Ploughshares, and TriQuarterly. His work often deals with doctor-patient communication, and many poems are in the voices of patients or doctors.

Straus' work was the basis of a 2004 exhibition at Lehigh University called "THE BRIDGE: A Journey Through Illness" with a catalog and essay by poet John Yau.

== Contemporary art ==
Straus made his first art acquisition of four Milton Resnick paintings while still a teenager.

Straus and his wife, Livia, began collecting contemporary art by 1966. Their collection has been featured in The NY Times, Forbes, Harper's Bazaar, Contemporanea, Art & Antiques, and ARTnews. The couples' personal art collection includes four pop art prints and one oil painting by Roy Lichtenstein, two works by Claes Oldenburgs (plaster loaves of bread from 1961 and a molded rubber screw from 1975), and three works by Jasper Johns. Their collection has been listed in Art & Antiques as one of the Top 100 collections in the US.

Straus has written some 35 articles in leading publications on art collecting and art criticism and was president of the Aldrich Museum of Contemporary Art in Ridgefield, Connecticut.

In 2002, the couple founded the Hudson Valley Center for Contemporary Art, turning a 12,000 square feet (1,100 square metres) former paneling factory in Peekskill, New York, into a space for cutting-edge contemporary art by artists like Folkert de Jong and Thomas Hirschhorn. The facility was later renamed the Hudson Valley MOCA. Its focus is on emerging artists from around the world and supporting an economically challenged area with education programs.

Straus opened MARC STRAUS, a contemporary art gallery on Grand Street, Manhattan, in 2011, across the street from where his father's store had been. The gallery represents 24 artists from 16 different counties. In 2014, Flash Art listed MARC STRAUS as among the top 100 galleries in the world.

== Philanthropic work ==
In 2001, Straus and his wife established the Marc and Livia Straus Foundation to support their artistic endeavors.

Straus was a Trustee of Franklin and Marshall College from 1994 – 2004. He also funded the establishment of the school’s first Jewish Studies program.

In 2017, the Strauses donated the former Devitt’s Medical Arts Building in New Windsor, New York to Abilities First, a regional provider of education, vocational development, and residential for individuals with developmental disabilities. The gift, valued at $3.2M, was the largest in the organization’s history. The building became the first Orange County location for the Abilities First School and was named in honor of Straus and his family.

== Personal life ==
Straus and his wife met while the two were teenagers. They live in Chappaqua, NY.

== Allegations of research misconduct ==
In June 1978, two nurses and two trainees who worked with him at the Boston University School of Medicine (BUSM) alleged that Straus had ordered them to falsify patients' records, had failed to get proper consent from patients, and had improperly administered drugs. Straus denied personal involvement in wrongdoing asserting his innocence and maintaining that he had been framed by disgruntled subordinates.

Straus resigned from his posts at Boston University Medical Center Hospital (which has, since 1996, been part of Boston Medical Center) and BUSM later that month. Following his resignation, Straus made multiple requests for external peer review of the charges against him. BU refused, leading Straus to conclude that the internal evaluation of his work was tainted because of investigator bias and lack of protection for the records.

In 1980, while the investigation was ongoing, the National Cancer Institute awarded Straus a three-year grant of about $910,000 to conduct research. In 1981, Vincent T. DeVita Jr., Director of the NCI, testified before Congress, saying that his agency's award of the research grant was "on the ground that the charges against the scientist had not yet been proven."

One year later, Straus filed a $33 million lawsuit against five of his former co-workers, charging that they had conspired to discredit his work. Straus strongly denied that he had engaged in any wrongdoing, alleging that his signature had been forged.

Ruth Moran, MD, PhD, Straus’ lab chief from 1972 testified:

"Having worked side by side with Dr. Straus for 8 years ...the allegations to be totally inconsistent with what I know his scientific standards to be... The (BUMC) committee refused to see me. Dr. Straus’ chief data manager (Mary Jane Rimmer, R.N.) reported to me ... that she had always been instructed by Dr. Straus to record data accurately."

In 1981, 78 cancer doctors and researchers convened "Scientists Supporting the Rights of Marc J. Straus, M.D.", chaired by Mendel Krim, M.D. and Ruth Moran, MD Ph.D. They petitioned DeVita and Arthur Hayes, Commissioner of the FDA, for a unitary blue ribbon review with full disclosure of relevant documents.

Straus settled with the U.S. Department of Health and Human Services in 1982, acknowledging "that false reports were submitted, that some ineligible patients were used in the studies, and that some patients received drug dosages that deviated from the plan of the study." Straus maintained that these false reports were submitted without his knowledge.

In October 1982, Straus published a paper in Cancer Treatment Reports, a journal funded by the National Cancer Institute. The propriety of that publication was questioned in the journal Science. Straus continued to publish scientific clinical studies through 1998.

== Books ==
LUNG CANCER Clinical Diagnosis and Treatment (1977) Edited by Marc J. Straus, M.D. Grune & Stratton

LUNG CANCER Clinical Diagnosis and Treatment (1983) Edited by Marc J. Straus, M.D. Grune & Stratton

SCARLET CROWN (1994), Aureole Press, Craftsman Printers

ONE WORD (1994), TriQuarterly Books, Northwestern University Press

SYMMETRY (2000), TriQuarterly Books, Northwestern University Press

NOT GOD: A Play in Verse (2006), TriQuarterly Books, Northwestern University Press.

== Select medical research ==
- Straus, Marc J. "Combination chemotherapy in advanced lung cancer with increased survival." Cancer 38.6 (1976): 2232-2241.
- Straus, Marc J., et al. "Estrogen receptor heterogeneity and the relationship between estrogen receptor and the tritiated thymidine labeling index in human breast cancer." Oncology 39.4 (1982): 197–200. Straus, Marc J., and Ruth E. Moran. "Cell cycle parameters in human solid tumors." Cancer 40.4 (1977): 1453–1461.
- Straus, Marc J., and Ruth E. Moran. "The cell cycle kinetics of human breast cancer." Cancer 46.12 (1980): 2634–2639.
- Moran, Ruth E., and Marc J. Straus. "Synchronization of L1210 leukemia with hydroxyurea infusion and the effect of subsequent pulse dose chemotherapy." Cancer Treat Rep 64 (1980): 81–6.
- Moran, Ruth E., and Marc J. Straus. "Cytokinetic analysis of L1210 leukemia after continuous infusion of hydroxyurea in vivo." Cancer research 39.5 (1979): 1616–1622.
- Moran, Ruth E., and Marc J. Straus. "Effects of pulse and continuous intravenous infusion of cis-diamminedichloroplatinum on L1210 leukemia in vivo." Cancer research 41.12 Part 1 (1981): 4993–4996.
- Straus, Marc J. "Cytokinetic Chemotherapy Design for the Treatment of Advanced Lung Cancer 1, 2." Cancer treatment reports 63.5–8 (1979): 767. Cytokinetic analysis of L1210 leukemia after continuous infusion of hydroxyurea in vivo
- Straus, Marc J., Vivian Sege, and Sung C. Choi. "The effect of surgery and pretreatment or posttreatment adjuvant chemotherapy on primary tumor growth in an animal model." Journal of surgical oncology 7.6 (1975): 497–512.
- Straus, Marc J., et al. "The uptake, excretion, and radiation hazards of tritiated thymidine in humans." Cancer research 37.2 (1977): 610–618.
- Straus, Marc J., Nathan Mantel, and Abraham Goldin. "The Effect of the Sequence of Administration of Cytoxan and Methotrexate on the Life-span of L1210 Leukemic Mice." Cancer research 32.2 (1972): 200–207
