= Oyster Bay (inlet) =

Coordinates: 40°54′04″N 73°32′09″W

Oyster Bay, also known as Oyster Bay Harbor, is an inlet of Long Island Sound on the north shore of Long Island in New York in the United States.

The bay lies in Nassau County. The hamlet of Oyster Bay within the Town of Oyster Bay is on its shore.

The United States Navy motor torpedo boat tender USS Oyster Bay, in commission from 1943 to 1946, was named for Oyster Bay.
