= Guy (given name) =

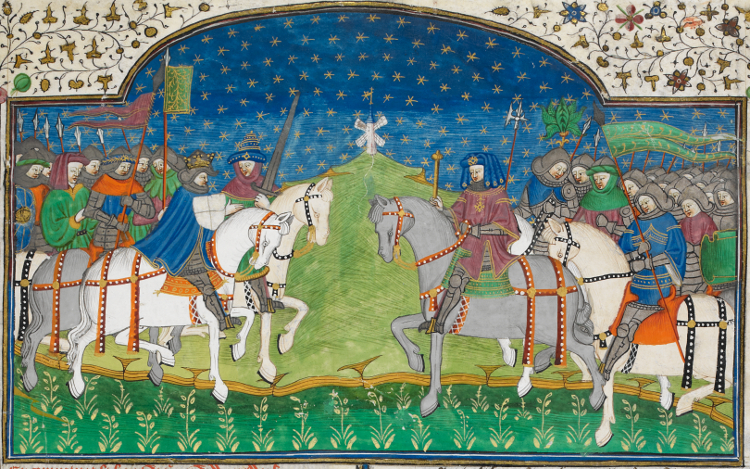
- Guy of Warwick as a courtier and pilgrim; detail of a miniature from BL Royal MS 15 E vi, f. 227r (the "Talbot Shrewsbury Book"). Held and digitised by the British Library.
- Gender: Masculine
- Language: French version of an old German name

Origin
- Meaning: Either wood or wide

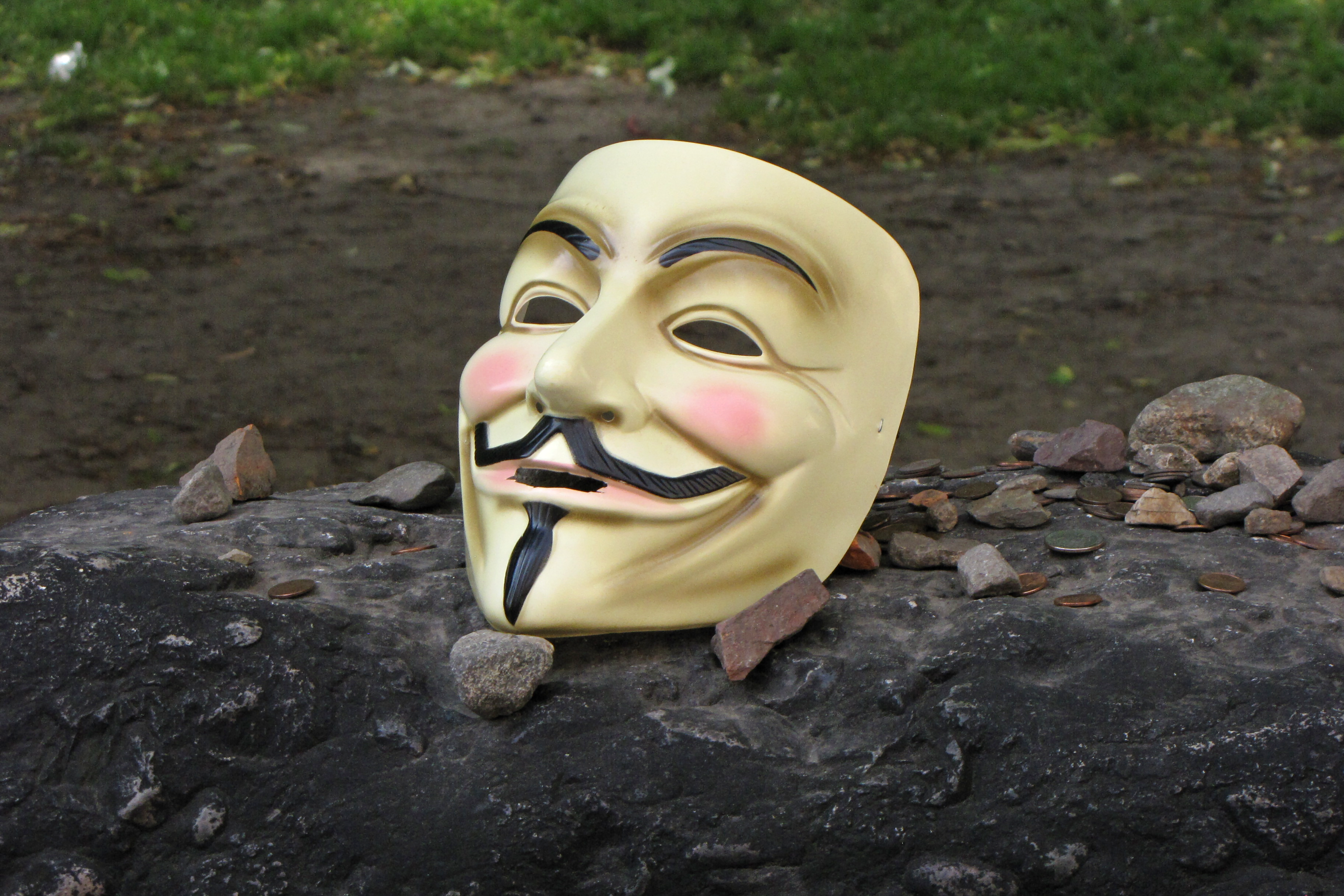
Guy Fawkes mask.

Guy (/ɡaɪ/ ghy, French: [ɡi]) is a masculine given name derived from an abbreviated version of a Germanic name that began either with witu, meaning wood, or wit, meaning wide. In French, the letter w became gu and the name became Guy, Gui or Guido. In Latin, the name was written as Wido. It was a popular name in Normandy and was used in England as well after the Norman Conquest. The name was popularized by romantic ballads about the dragon-slaying, giant-fighting folk hero Guy of Warwick. Guy Fawkes and the failed 1605 Gunpowder Plot later made the name synonymous with treachery in England. Effigies of Guy Fawkes are burned every year on Guy Fawkes Night in the United Kingdom. By the early 19th century, the tradition led to Guy being a term in England for a poorly dressed man. In the United States, guy became slang for an everyman. Its use for characters by Sir Walter Scott in the 1815 novel Guy Mannering and by Charlotte Yonge in her 1853 novel The Heir of Redclyffe popularized the name in the United States. In recent years, Guy Fawkes masks have symbolized resistance to tyranny. Unrelated to this, Guy is also an Anglicization of the Hebrew name Hebrew: גיא, romanized: Gai, which means "ravine".

== Usage ==
Guy was among the top 1,000 names for boys in the United States between 1880 and 2006 and was among the top 100 names for American boys between 1880 and 1901. It was among the 1,000 most popular names for boys in France between 1900 and 1990 and was a top 100 name for French boys between 1906 and 1970. It has been among the top 1,000 names for boys in the United Kingdom since 1996.

== People ==
=== Religious figures ===
- Saint Vitus (290–303), also known as Saint Guy, early Christian martyr
- Guy (bishop of Amiens) (died 1075), eleventh-century churchman
- Guy of Anderlecht (950–1012), Belgian Christian saint
- Guy of Avesnes (1253–1317), Bishop of Utrecht

=== Nobility ===
- Guy I (disambiguation)
- Guy II (disambiguation)
- Guy III (disambiguation)
- Guy, Count of Flanders (c. 1226–1305), Guy of Dampierre
- Guy, Count of Nevers (died 1176), count of Nevers and Auxerre
- Guy of Hauteville (died 1108), Duke of Amalfi
- Guy of Ibelin (disambiguation)
- Guy of Ivrea (940–965), Margrave of Ivrea
- Guy of Lusignan (1150–1194), King of Jerusalem and later King of Cyprus
- Guy of Lusignan, Count of Angoulême (c. 1260/1265–1308), ending of the senior male line of the House of Lusignan
- Guy de Montfort, Count of Bigorre (died 1220), son of Simon de Montfort, 5th Earl of Leicester
- Guy de Montfort, Count of Nola (1244–1288), son of Simon de Montfort, 6th Earl of Leicester and Eleanor of England
- Guy de Montfort, Lord of Sidon (died 1228), younger son of Simon III de Montfort and Amicia, sister of Robert FitzPernel, Earl of Leicester
- Guy of Nantes (died before 819), warden of the Breton March
- Guy, Margrave of Tuscany (died 929), also Count and Duke of Lucca
- Guy, Duke of Sorrento (c. 1012–?), the duke of Sorrento from 1035
- Guy IV of Spoleto (died 897), Duke of Spoleto and Camerino and Prince of Benevento; son of Guy II of Spoleto
- Guy of Thouars (died 1213), third husband of Constance, Duchess of Brittany, and regent of Brittany

=== Sports ===
- Guy Abrahams (born 1953), Panamanian runner
- Guy Accoceberry (born 1967), French rugby union footballer
- Guy Akpagba (born 1990), Beninese footballer
- Guy Allen (born 1958), ProRodeo Hall of Fame cowboy
- Guy Amouretti (1925–2011), French international table tennis player
- Guy Azouri (born 1963), Israeli football manager
- Guy Barnea (born 1987), Israeli Olympic swimmer
- Guy Barrabino (1934–2017), French fencer
- Guy Basquet (1921–2006), French rugby union player
- Guy Benjamin (born 1955), American football quarterback
- Guy Callaghan (born 1970), New Zealand butterfly swimmer
- Guy Carbonneau (born 1960), French-Canadian hockey player and former NHL head coach
- Guy Charron (born 1949), French Canadian hockey player and former NHL head coach
- Guy Chouinard (born 1956), French Canadian hockey player
- Guy Forget (born 1965), French tennis player
- Guy Goodes (born 1971), Israeli basketball player and coach
- Guy Hebert (born 1967), American hockey goalie
- Guy Husson (1931–2025), French hammer thrower
- Guy Orly Iradukunda (born 1996), Burundian tennis player
- Guy Lafleur (1951–2022), French Canadian Hall of Fame hockey player
- Guy Lapébie (1916–2010), French cyclist
- Guy Lapointe (born 1948), French Canadian Hall of Fame hockey player
- Guy Million (1932–2004), French cyclist
- Guy Murray, American track/cross country coach and former marathon runner
- Guy Nosbaum (1930–1996), French Olympic medalist rower
- Guy Palatin (born 2000), Israeli basketball player
- Guy Pnini (born 1983), Israeli basketball player
- Guy Rodgers (born 1935), American basketball player
- Guy Roux (born 1938), French football player and manager of AJ Auxerre (1961–2008)
- Guy Ruff (born 1960), American football player
- Guy Sasson (born 1980), Israeli Paralympic wheelchair tennis player
- Guy Starik (born 1965), Israeli Olympic sport shooter
- Guy Toindouba (born 1988), Cameroonian football midfielder
- Guy Turnbow (1908–1975), American football player
- Guy Whittall (born 1972), Zimbabwean cricket player
- Guy Whittingham (born 1964), British footballer

=== Other ===
- Guy Adami (born 1963), American television TV personality
- Guy Adams (born 1976), English author, comedian, and actor
- Guy Aitchison (born 1968), tattoo artist and a painter born in Michigan
- Guy Allison (born 1959), American composer, pianist, and producer
- Guy Amsler (1895–1986), associate justice of the Arkansas Supreme Court
- Guy Anderson (1906–1998), American painter
- Guy André (born 1959), member of the Canadian House of Commons
- Guy André Boy (born 1952), French and American scientist and engineer
- Guy Andrews, American television writer
- Guy Arkins (1888–1980), Australian politician
- Guy Arnold (1932–2020), British author
- Guy Aroch, Israeli-American fashion and celebrity photographer
- Guy Arvely Dolsin (born 1957), Malagasy politician
- Guy Babylon (1956–2009), keyboardist/composer
- Guy Bacon (1936–2018), politician in Quebec, Canada
- Guy Bailey (born 1950), president of Texas Tech University
- Guy Bainbridge (1867–1943), British Army officer during the First World War
- Guy Banister (1901–1964), a career employee of the Federal Bureau of Investigation and a private investigator
- Guy Bartkus (1999–2025), American terrorist perpetrator of the 2025 Palm Springs fertility clinic bombing
- Guy Bavli (born 1971), Israeli mentalist, illusionist, and lecturer
- Guy Beahm (born 1982), pro gamer, mainly known by his gamer tag Dr DisRespect
- Guy Beatty (1870–1954), officer in the British Indian Army
- Guy Bedarida (born 1963), Italian-born French jewelry designer
- Guy Bedos (1934–2020), actor and stand-up comedian
- Guy Beiner (born 1968), historian of the late-modern period
- Guy Bellamy (1935–2015), English author known for humorous novels
- Guy Ben-Ari (born 1984), Israeli painter
- Guy Ben-Ner (born 1969), Israeli video artist
- Guy Bennett (born 1960), poet/translator and author
- Guy Benson (born 1985), American political commentator and pundit
- Guy Berryman (born 1978), Scottish musician of Coldplay
- Guy Bertrand (broadcaster) (born 1954), French Canadian linguist and radio/TV personality
- Guy Bolton (1884–1979), Anglo-American playwright
- Guy Bomford (1899–1996), British soldier and geodesist
- Guy Boyd (1923–1988), Australian sculptor
- Guy Boyd (born 1943), American actor
- Guy Branum (born 1975), American comedian
- Guy Burgess (1911–1963), Soviet double agent, one of the Cambridge Five spy ring
- Guy Burnet (born 1983), English actor who played Craig Dean on the soap opera Hollyoaks
- Guy Busick, American film and television screenwriter
- Guy Carawan (1927–2015), American folk musician and musicologist
- Guy Chambers (born 1963), British songwriter of Robbie Williams fame
- Guy Clark (1941–2016), American singer-songwriter
- Guy Comtois (1961–2025), American politician from New Hampshire
- Guy Consolmagno (born 1952), American Jesuit brother and astronomer
- Guy Debord (1931–1994), French author and filmmaker, Situationist
- Guy Distad, American television director
- Guy Drake (1904–1984), American singer and comedian
- Guy Waldo Dunnington (1906–1974), American biographer, professor, and translator
- Guy Fawkes (1570–1606), English Catholic famed for his involvement in the Gunpowder Plot
- Guy Fieri (born 1968), American chef, restaurateur, and television personality
- Guy Fournier (born 1931), author, playwright, and screenwriter
- Guy Fletcher (born 1960), English musician of Dire Straits and Mark Knopfler's solo band
- Guy Garvey (born 1974), English musician. Singer and principal songwriter of the alternative rock band Elbow
- Guy Gavriel Kay (born 1954), Canadian fantasy writer
- Guy Gibson (1918–1944), British Second World War pilot awarded the Victoria Cross
- Guy Guzzone (born 1960), Majority Leader of the Maryland Senate
- Guy Gillette (1879–1973), former U.S. Senator from Iowa
- Guy Goma (born 1969), who gained fame when he was accidentally interviewed on BBC
- Guy Gunaratne (born 1984), British journalist, filmmaker, and novelist
- Guy Hamilton (1922–2016), British film director
- Guy Harvey (born 1955), Jamaican marine wildlife artist and conservationist
- Guy Hever (1977–possibly 1997 or after), Israeli soldier who disappeared
- Guy-Manuel de Homem-Christo (born 1974), French musician, record producer, singer, songwriter, DJ and film director
- Guy J (born 1986), DJ
- Guy Antony Jameson (born 1934), British aerospace engineer
- Guy Kawasaki (born 1954), American former Apple employee and venture capitalist
- Guy Kent (born 1989), American actor and producer
- Guy Kewney (1946–2010), British journalist
- Guy Kibbee (1882–1956), American actor
- Guy Laliberté (born 1959), Canadian businessman, founder and CEO of Cirque du Soleil
- Guy Le Borgne (1920–2007), French paratroop general
- Guy Le Jaouen (1933–2014), French politician
- Guy Lee (1918–2005), British scholar and poet
- Guy Alexis Lobineau (1666–1727), Breton historian and Benedictine monk
- Guy Lombardo (1902–1977), Canadian-American bandleader and musician
- Guy Madison (1922–1996), American actor
- Guy Marchand (1937–2023), French actor, musician and singer
- Guy Martin (born 1981), British motorcycle racer, truck mechanic and TV personality
- Guy de Maupassant (1850–1893), French writer and journalist
- Guy McAfee (1888–1960), owner of gambling saloons and brothels in Los Angeles, California and casinos in Las Vegas, Nevada
- Guy Mitchell (1927–1999), American singer and actor
- Guy Molinari (1928–2018), former US Representative from New York
- Guy Mollet (1905–1975), former prime minister of France
- Guy Moon (1962–2026), American film and television composer
- Guy Mowbray (born 1972), English football commentator
- Guy Oseary (born 1972), Israeli American businessman
- Guy Pearce (born 1967), English-born Australian actor
- Guy Perry, American actor
- Guy Picciotto (born 1965), of the band Fugazi
- Guy Pratt (born 1962), British session musician
- Guy Randrianarisoa (born 1962), Malagasy politician
- Guy Remmers (born 1995), English actor
- Guy Richer (born 1954), Canadian actor
- Guy Ritchie (born 1968), British film director, formerly married to Madonna
- Guy Rivard (born 1936), Canadian politician
- Guy B. Roberts, American government official, lawyer, and retired United States Marine Corps colonel'
- Guy M. Robinson (born 1951), human geographer
- Guy de Rothschild (1909–2007), French banker
- Guy Sebastian (born 1981), singer and winner of the first Australian Idol
- Guy Severin (1926–2008), former director of NPP Zvezda
- Guy Simonds (1903–1974), Canadian major general
- Guy Siner (born 1947), American-born English actor known for portraying Hubert Gruber in the sitcom 'Allo 'Allo!
- Guy Standing (1873–1937), English actor
- Guy Standing (economist) (born 1948), British economist
- Guy L. Steele Jr. (born 1954), American computer scientist and designer of the Scheme programming language
- Guy Talarico (born 1955), American state politician
- Guy Thomas-Everard (born 1969), English farmer
- Guy Trosper (1911–1963), American screenwriter
- Guy Velella, New York State Senator and felon
- Guy Verhofstadt (born 1953), Prime Minister of Belgium (1999–2008)
- Guy Waggoner (1883–1950), American rancher and business executive
- Guy Warren (1923–2008), also known as Kofi Ghanaba, Ghanaian musician
- Guy Weill (1914–2006), Swiss-born American art collector
- Guy Wetmore Carryl (1873–1904), American author and poet
- Guy Whatley (born 1975), American organist

== Fictional characters ==
- Guy, a character from the Final Fight and Street Fighter series
- Guy, the protagonist of the 2021 film Free Guy
- Guy of Gisbourne, a villain in the Robin Hood legend
- Guy of Warwick, a legendary English hero
- Guy Caballero, a character in the Canadian sketch comedy TV series SCTV
- Guy Gardner, a DC Comics character
- Guy Montag, a character in the Ray Bradbury novel Fahrenheit 451
- Guy Noir, a character in A Prairie Home Companion
- Guy Smiley, a Muppet character from Sesame Street
- Guy Thierrault, the second Marvel Comics supervillain known as Flag-Smasher
- Guy Patterson (Shades), drummer from the fictional band The Wonders in 1996 film That Thing You Do!

== See also ==
- Guido
- Gaetano
- Guy (disambiguation)
- Guy (surname)
