= Guido =

- Pronunciation: Italian: [ˈɡwiːdo] German: [ˈɡiːdo]
- Gender: male

Origin
- Origin: Italian, Ancient Germanic
- Meaning: Forest, Guide

Other names
- Related names: Guy, Gvidas

Guido is a given name. It has been a male first name in Italy, Austria, Germany, Switzerland, Argentina, the Low Countries, Scandinavia, Spain, Portugal and Latin America, as well as other places with migration from those. Regarding origins, there are most likely homonymous forms of it, that is, from several etymological predecessors but now seeming to be the same name. One of the likely homonyms is Germanic Guido representing the Latinisation from the Old High German name Wido, which meant "wood" (that is, "forest"). Another likely homonym is the Italian Guido from a latinate root for "guide". The third likely homonym is the Italian Guido with phonetic correspondence to Latin Vitus, whereas the Latin v (/w/), the Latin i (/iː/), and the terminal syllable -tus have predictable homology with the Italian /u/, /iː/, and -do. Thus, for example, Saint Vitus has also been known in Italian as Guido.

The slang term Guido is used in American culture to refer derogatorily to an urban working-class Italian or Italian-American male who is overly aggressive or macho with a tendency for certain conspicuous behaviour. It may also be used as a more general ethnic slur for working-class urban Italian Americans.

== People ==
=== Given name ===
==== Medieval times ====
- Guido (composer) (c. 1372–1374), French composer and cantor
- Guido of Acqui (c. 1004–1070), bishop of Acqui, Italy
- Guido of Anderlecht (c. 950–1012), Belgian saint
- Guido of Arezzo (c. 991/992–after 1033), Italian music theorist
- Guido da Velate, (died 1071) bishop of Milan
- Guido Bonatti (died c. 1298), Italian mathematician, astronomer and astrologer
- Guido Cavalcanti (c. 1250s–1300), Italian (Florentine) poet and friend of Dante
- Guido delle Colonne (fl. 1287), Italian writer and contemporary of Dante
- Guido I da Montefeltro (1223–1298), advisor to Pope Boniface VIII
- Guido di Pietro (c. 1395–1455), Italian Renaissance painter better known as Fra Angelico
- Guido of Pisa (d. 1169), Italian geographer
- Guido of Siena, 13th-century Italian painter
- Guido II of Spoleto (died 882), Duke of Spoleto and Margrave of Camerino
- Guy III of Spoleto (died 895), King of Italy and Holy Roman Emperor

==== Later use ====
- Guido Alvarenga (born 1970), Paraguayan footballer
- Guido Andreozzi (born 1991), Argentine tennis player
- Guido Barbujani (born 1955), Italian population geneticist, evolutionist and literary author
- Guido Barreyro (born 1988), Argentine footballer
- Guido Beck (1903–1988), Argentine physicist
- Guido de Bres (1522–1567), Belgian pastor, theologian, author of Belgic Confession
- Guido Buchwald (born 1961) German footballer
- Guido Buscaglia (born 1996), Argentine swimmer
- Guido Cagnacci (1601–1663), Italian painter
- Guido Calabresi (born 1932), American judge and former Dean of Yale Law School
- Guido Calza (1888–1946) Italian archaeologist
- Guido Cannetti (born 1979), Argentine mixed martial artist
- Guido Cantelli (1920–1956), Italian orchestral conductor
- Guido Cantz (born 1971), German television presenter
- Guido Carrillo (born 1991), Argentine footballer
- Guido Castelnuovo (1865–1952), Italian mathematician
- Guido Corteggiano (born 1987), Argentine footballer
- Guido Cortese (1908–1964), Italian lawyer and politician
- Guido Dal Casón (born 1993), Argentine footballer
- Guido Deiro (1886–1950), Italian-born vaudeville piano-accordionist
- Guido Di Fonzo (born 1996), Argentine footballer
- Guido di Tella (1931–2001), Argentine businessman, academic and diplomat
- Guido Di Vanni (born 1988), Argentine footballer
- Guido Falaschi (1989–2011), Argentine racecar driver
- Guido Fanconi (1892–1979), Swiss pediatrician
- Guy Fawkes (later Guido Fawkes) (1570–1606), English Catholic who attempted to blow up the Houses of Parliament in the Gunpowder Plot
- Guido Fubini (1879–1943), Italian mathematician
- Guido Gezelle (1830–1899), Flemish writer, poet and priest
- Guido Gómez (born 1994), Italian footballer of Argentine descent
- Guido Gorgatti (1919–2023), Argentine film actor
- Guido Görtzen (born 1970), Dutch volleyball player
- Guido Grandi (1671–1742), Italian priest and professor of mathematics
- Guido Guerrini, (born 1976), Italian rally driver
- Guido Herrera (born 1992), Argentine footballer
- Guido Imbens (born 1963), Dutch-American economist
- Guido Kaczka (born 1978), Argentine TV presenter
- Guido Knopp (born 1946), German historian, journalist and producer of history documentaries
- Guido Kratschmer (born 1953), German decathlete and former world record holder
- Guido de Lavezaris (c. 1512 – c. 1581), Spanish Governor General of the Philippines
- Guido von List (1848–1919), Austrian occultist, journalist, playwright, and novelist
- Guido Mainero (born 1995), Argentine footballer
- Guido Mantega (born 1949), Italian-born Finance Minister of Brazil
- Guido de Marco (1931–2010), Maltese politician, who served as the sixth President of Malta from 1999 to 2004
- Guido Marini (born 1965), Italian Roman Catholic priest
- Guido Migliozzi (born 1997), Italian golfer
- Guido Milán (born 1987), Argentine footballer
- Guido Mina di Sospiro, Argentine-born writer
- Guido Morselli (1912–1973), Italian writer
- Guido De Padt (born 1954), Belgian politician
- Guido Palau, British hair stylist
- Guido Pella (born 1990), Argentine tennis player
- Guido Petti (born 1994), Argentine rugby union player
- Guido Pizarro (born 1990), Argentine footballer
- Guido Rancez (born 1990), Argentine footballer
- Guido Randisi (born 1989), Argentine rugby union footballer
- Guido Ratto (born 1999), Argentine footballer
- Guido Reni (1575–1642), Italian painter
- Guido Reybrouck (born 1941), Belgian cyclist
- Guido Rodríguez (born 1994), Argentine footballer
- Guido Sandleris (born 1971), Argentine economist
- Guido Stampacchia (1922–1978), Italian mathematician
- Guido Vadalá (born 1997), Argentine footballer
- Guido van Rossum (born 1956), Dutch programmer, creator of the Python programming language
- Guido Vildoso (born 1937), Bolivian military officer and de facto president in 1982
- Guido Volpi (born 1995), Argentine rugby union footballer
- Guido Westerwelle (1961–2016), German politician
- Guido Wieland (1906–1993), Austrian actor

=== Family name ===
- Al Guido (1979-), Chief Executive Officer of the San Francisco 49ers and the Chairman and CEO of Elevate Sports Ventures
- Beatriz Guido (1922–1988), Argentine novelist and screenwriter
- José María Guido (1910–1975), president of Argentina between 1962 and 1963
- Peggy Guido (1912–1994), also known as Peggy Piggott, English archaeologist and prehistorian
- Tomás Guido (1788–1866), Argentine general, diplomat and politician
- Sandor Guido (born 1978), Nicaraguan baseball player and coach

=== Fictional characters ===
- Guido Mista, the gunman of Bucciarati's gang in part 5 of the manga, JoJo's Bizarre Adventure
- Guido Anselmi, film director played by Marcello Mastroianni in Federico Fellini's film 8 1/2
- Commissario Guido Brunetti, the protagonist of Donna Leon's crime fiction series set in Venice, Italy
- Father Guido Sarducci, character portrayed by American comedian Don Novello
- Guido Hatzis, a comic character created by Australian comedians Moclair and Schiller
- Guido Carosella a.k.a. Strong Guy, a mutant from the Marvel Comics universe
- Guido, a character in the Cars franchise
- Guido, a Microraptor gui character who appears in The Land Before Time XII: The Great Day of the Flyers and the TV episode "The Hermit of Black Rock"
- Guido, a character in the Myth Adventures series created by Robert Asprin
- Prince Guido (Russian: Gvidon), character from The Tale of Tsar Saltan by Alexander Pushkin
- Guido il Cortese, the protagonist in Mary Shelley's short story "Transformation"
- Guido, the killer pimp in Risky Business portrayed by Joe Pantoliano
- Guido Anchovy, a main character from the animated cartoon series Samurai Pizza Cats
- Guido Orefice, the main protagonist in the Italian comedy film Life Is Beautiful
- Guido, right-hand man of primary antagonist Kromer in Canto III of video game Limbus Company

== Other ==
- Guido Fawkes, a British political website run by blogger Paul Staines

== See also ==
- Guideschi
- List of Latinised names
