= Tax exile =

Leaving a country to avoid paying taxes

A tax exile is a person who leaves a country to avoid the payment of income tax or other taxes. The term refers to an individual who already owes money to the tax authorities or wishes to avoid being liable in the future for taxation at what they consider high tax rates, instead choosing to reside in a foreign country or jurisdiction which has no taxes or lower tax rates.

In general, there is no extradition agreement between countries which covers extradition for outstanding tax liabilities. Going into tax exile is a form of tax mitigation or avoidance. A tax exile normally cannot return to their home country without being subject to outstanding tax liabilities. This may prevent the individual from leaving the country until these taxes owing have been paid.

Most countries tax individuals who are resident in their jurisdiction. Though residency rules vary, most commonly individuals are resident in a country for taxation purposes if they spend at least six months (or some other period) in any one tax year in the country, and/or have an abiding attachment to the country, such as owning a fixed property.

== National rules ==
=== United Kingdom ===
Under UK law a person is "tax resident" if that person meets any of the residency tests set out under the Statutory Residency Test introduced on 6 April 2014.

The Statutory Residence Test states that a person will be non-resident if they meet one of the three Automatic Overseas Tests. The Automatic Overseas Tests focus on how much time a person spends visiting the UK. For example, the first Automatic Overseas Test states that if a person spends less than 16 days in the UK in a tax year, then that person will be non-resident.

If a person is not able to meet any of the Automatic Overseas Tests, then they can still be non-resident under the Statutory Residence Test, but to do so they must ensure (a) they do not meet the Automatic Residence Tests, and (b) they are categorised as non-resident under the Sufficient Ties Test. The Sufficient Ties Test determines whether a person is resident or non-resident by reference to their UK ties and their UK visits. The fewer ties a person has to the UK, and the less time the person spends in the UK, the more likely they are to be UK non-resident.

=== United States ===
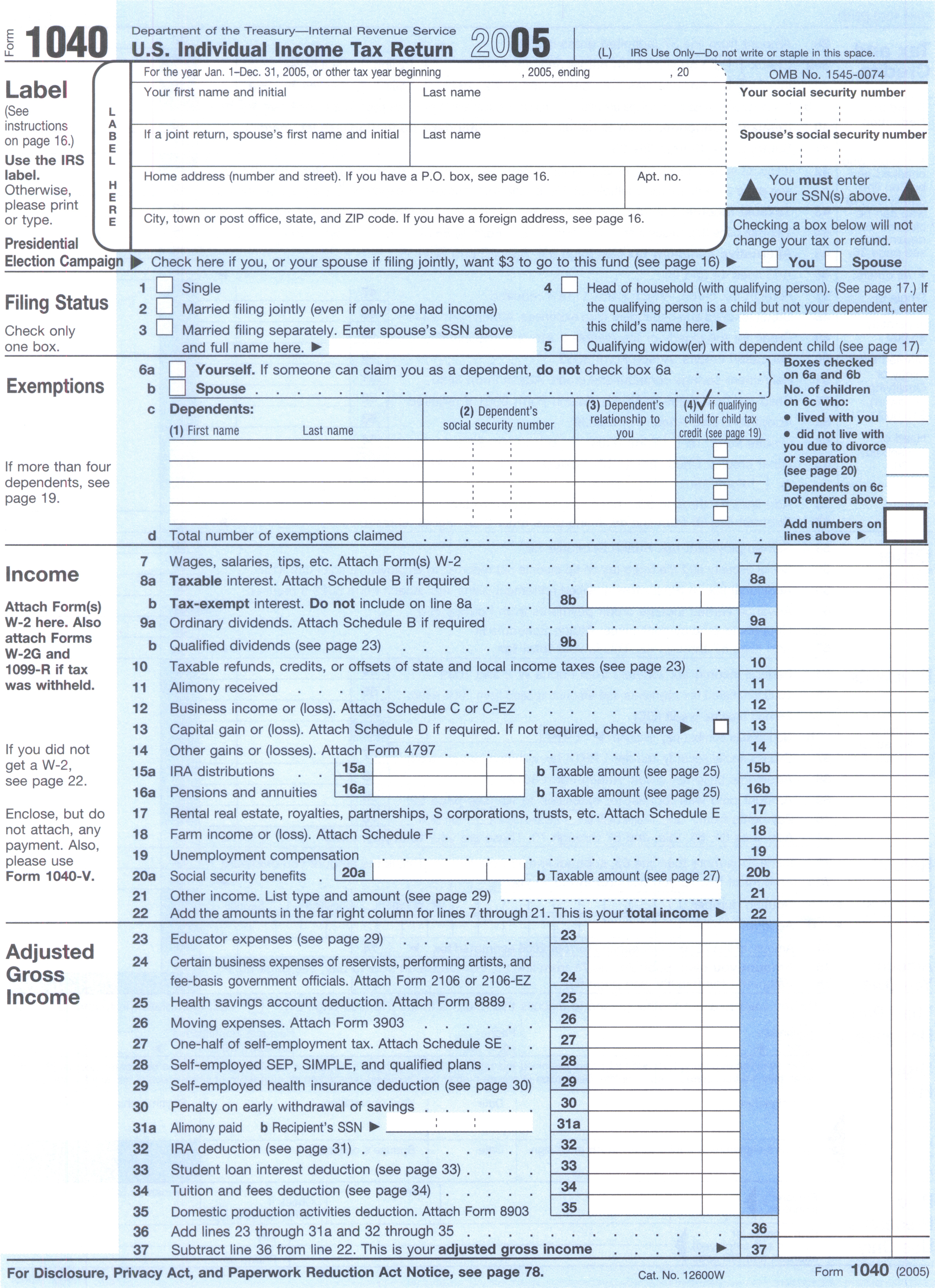
The worldwide income thresholds that determine whether an individual must file a U.S. tax return are exactly the same no matter where in the world a "U.S. person" lives.

Under the Internal Revenue Code, a "U.S. person" (including United States citizens and U.S. permanent residents) is taxed on his or her worldwide income regardless of place of residence. U.S. persons can avoid U.S. tax liability on non-U.S. source income only by moving abroad, renouncing citizenship (or terminating or losing permanent residence), documenting that renunciation/termination/loss, and (as often required) formally exiting the U.S. tax system via IRS Form 8854. Exiting high net worth and high income individuals may owe an expatriation tax. However, if they continue to receive income from any U.S. sources, they will still be liable for U.S. taxes, often on a tax withholding basis and sometimes with less favorable tax rates (such as dividend tax rates). U.S. states and municipalities with their own tax systems sometimes have different exit rules.

U.S. persons living abroad are often entitled to substantial U.S. tax relief principally through the foreign earned income exclusion, foreign housing exclusion, and/or foreign tax credit (claimed via IRS Forms 2555 and 1116). Moreover, effective U.S. income tax rates can occasionally be negative: in principle, some U.S. persons can qualify for refundable tax credits (net cash payments from the IRS) on non-excluded income even while living outside the U.S., such as the past Making Work Pay tax credit. All other U.S. tax advantages remain available in principle, such as U.S. tax-advantaged retirement and education savings accounts. No matter where they live, U.S. persons must file all required financial reports such as U.S. FinCEN Form 114.

As mentioned above, a permanent resident in the United States is generally treated as a citizen for tax purposes unless his or her residency lapses or otherwise ends. Former "long-term" permanent residents remain liable for U.S. taxes unless and until they formally exit the U.S. tax system via IRS Form 8854. An immigrant not legally admitted for permanent residence (such as a guest worker) generally becomes liable for U.S. taxes on worldwide income after spending a certain number of days in the U.S. within a certain time period, as described in IRS Publication 519.

== Notable tax exiles ==
- Bad Company moved to Malibu, California, in 1975 to avoid what Mick Ralphs described as "ridiculously high tax in England".
- David and Frederick Barclay purchased Brecqhou, one of the Channel Islands, located just west of Sark, in 1993 and gave their address as Avenue de Grande-Bretagne, Monte-Carlo. David passed away in 2021, but Frederick still lives on the island.
- John Barry, the composer of 11 James Bond films, moved to the United States in 1975 where he resided until his death in 2011.
- Shirley Bassey started living as a tax exile from the United Kingdom in 1968, and was unable to work in Britain for almost two years. She currently lives in Monte Carlo.
- Marc Bolan relocated to Los Angeles in 1973 due to the UK's income tax, staying there until relocating to London in mid-1976.
- David Bowie moved from the UK to Switzerland in 1976, first settling in Blonay and then Lausanne in 1982.
- Michael Caine moved to the US in the late 1970s to avoid the tax under James Callaghan's Labour government in Britain at the time. He returned to the UK several years later under Margaret Thatcher's Conservative government.
- Sean Connery left the UK in the 1980s and made his home in France, Spain and later The Bahamas for tax reasons.
- David Coverdale moved to West Germany in 1977 and recorded the majority of his studio album, White Snake, in a studio there (where some parts are recorded in the UK for a brief period of time). He eventually moved back to Britain to start Whitesnake. In the mid-1980s, he later permanently migrated to the United States during the height of Whitesnake's career peak for tax reasons.
- Ronnie Corbett and Ronnie Barker spent 1979 in Australia to avoid taxation on their previous year's income.
- Noël Coward left the UK for tax reasons in the 1950s, receiving harsh criticism in the press. He first settled in Bermuda but later bought houses in Jamaica and Switzerland (in the village of Les Avants, near Montreux), which remained his homes for the rest of his life.
- Brian Cox became a tax exile in the 1980s, settling in New York City.
- Gérard Depardieu, formerly a French national, became a tax exile, becoming an official resident of Néchin, Belgium, on 7 December 2012. Then on 15 December 2012, Depardieu handed back his French passport, and on 3 January 2013, was granted Russian citizenship.
- Marvin Gaye first relocated to Hawaii from Los Angeles to avoid problems with the IRS in 1980. Later that year, he relocated to London following the end of a European tour, then moved to Ostend, Belgium, in February 1981. He recorded his final album, Midnight Love (released in October 1982), while living in Belgium.
- Guy Hamilton, the director of four James Bond films, became a tax exile in the mid-1970s. He was originally hired to direct Superman (1978) but because of the UK tax laws, he could only remain there for 30 days a year.
- Stelios Haji-Ioannou was quoted as saying: "I have no UK income to be taxed in the UK."
- Tom Jones moved to Los Angeles for tax purposes following the election of Harold Wilson as British prime minister in 1974, who put income tax up to 83% for top earners.
- Joe Lewis, British billionaire and owner of Tottenham Hotspur FC, moved to the offshore tax haven Bahamas Islands in the 1970s to avoid UK tax..
- Roger Moore became a tax exile from the UK in 1978, originally to Switzerland, and divided his year between his three homes: an apartment in Monte Carlo, Monaco; a chalet in Crans-Montana, Switzerland; and a home in the south of France.
- In 1978, the members of the band Pink Floyd spent exactly one year outside of the UK, also for tax reasons.
- The Rolling Stones became tax exiles from the UK when they moved to the south of France in 1971. Some members used trusts and offshore companies to avoid payment of British taxes.
- Cat Stevens became a tax exile from the UK in 1973 for one year, living in Rio de Janeiro, Brazil.
- Rod Stewart left the UK and made his home in Los Angeles in 1975 to avoid the 83% tax on top earners that existed in Britain at the time.
- Toto Wolff was accused of being a tax exile by Red Bull Racing team principal Christian Horner. Wolff, who is originally from Austria, now resides in Monaco.

== In popular culture ==
- The V.I.P.s (1963) is a motion picture that has characters (e.g., Orson Welles as Max Buda) stranded at London Airport due to weather who are in fear of taxation if unable to depart within the day.
- The Tax Exile (1989) is the title of a novel by Guy Bellamy.
- In various versions of The Hitchhiker's Guide to the Galaxy by Douglas Adams, the rock star Hotblack Desiato is reported as "spending a year dead for tax reasons." Also, the character Veet Voojagig "was finally sent into tax exile, which is the usual fate reserved for those who are determined to make a fool of themselves in public."
- Characters in Michael Frayn's play Noises Off (1982) have to sneak into their home in England because they are tax exiles and will lose their status if it becomes known they are in the country.
- In Mad Men Season 2, Episode 11: "The Jet Set" (airdate October 12, 2008), Don Draper meets and spends time in Palm Springs with a group of tax exiles.

== See also ==
- Perpetual traveler
- Tax exporting
- Tax haven
- Ugland House
