= Reactions to Jersey Shore =

Reactions to Jersey Shore TV show

Jersey Shore is a reality television series that aired on MTV. It follows eight housemates while they live, work and party at the Jersey Shore. The show made its debut amid large amounts of controversy regarding the use of the words "guido/guidette", portrayals of Italian-American stereotypes as well as perpetuating stereotypes of New Jerseyans, especially because the cast members are not residents from the area. It premiered in December 2009 and ran through 2012.

The controversies in the series were due in large part to the manner in which MTV marketed the show, as it liberally used the word guido to describe the cast members. The word guido is generally regarded as an ethnic slur when referring to Italians and Italian Americans. One promotion stated that the show was to follow, "eight of the hottest, tannest, craziest Guidos", while yet another advertisement stated, "[the show] exposes one of the tri-state area's most misunderstood species ... the GUIDO. Yes, they really do exist! Our Guidos and Guidettes will move into the ultimate big beach house rental and indulge in everything the Seaside Heights, New Jersey scene has to offer".

== Background ==
Prior to the series debut, UNICO National, the National Italian American Foundation (NIAF), the Order Sons of Italy in America, the Italian watchdog website ItalianAware.com, and other Italian American organizations requested that MTV cancel the show. In a letter to the network, UNICO called the show a "... direct, deliberate and disgraceful attack on Italian Americans ..." UNICO National President Andre DiMino said in a statement "MTV has festooned the 'bordello-like' house set with Italian flags and red, white and green maps of New Jersey while every other cutaway shot is of Italian signs and symbols. They are blatantly as well as subliminally bashing Italian-Americans with every technique possible ..."

MTV responded to the controversy by issuing a press release which stated in part, "the Italian-American cast takes pride in their ethnicity. We understand that this show is not intended for every audience and depicts just one aspect of youth culture." Since the calls for the show's removal, several sponsors have requested that their ads not be aired during the show. These sponsors include Dell, Domino's, and American Family Insurance.

Subsequent seasons have encountered the continuous denouncement of the program by Italian American and other community-based organizations. The announcement of season 4 of the program being filmed on location in Italy was once again met with a swift reaction from the National Italian American Foundation, the National Organization of Italian American Women, UNICO National and other community-based groups.

== Beachcomber Bar & Grill incident ==
In August 2009, female cast member Nicole "Snooki" Polizzi was punched in the face after a confrontation with a man who had allegedly stolen her drink at the Beachcomber Bar & Grill in Seaside Heights. The assailant, Brad Ferro, a physical education teacher from Deer Park, New York, was arrested on simple assault and disorderly conduct charges. A promo of the clip aired after the show's December 3, 2009, premiere and circulated on the Internet. The incident would have aired on the December 17 episode, along with a public service announcement against violence towards women. Polizzi suffered bruises and swelling as a result of the punch.

As soon as the footage was aired on the season sneak-peek on MTV, Ferro was suspended from both of his positions at North Queens Community High School and the Middle Village School in Queens. After a short time, he was placed in one of the Department of Education's teacher reassignment centers. The Department of Education eventually fired Ferro. Subsequently, he had such a hard time getting a job that he ended up enlisting in the army.

Ferro has since apologized to Polizzi stating, "I deeply regret what happened. Nobody deserves that. That was not the real Brad Ferro." Ferro later pleaded guilty to a nonindictable offense in municipal court. He was found guilty of simple assault, fined $500 and given a 6-month suspended jail sentence. Ferro's father feels that his son was provoked into "doing something stupid", saying, "When you get a bunch of people in a situation with alcohol and instigate, someone's going to do something stupid, and that's obviously what MTV wants."

After the clip of Polizzi's incident was aired after the first and second episodes, MTV decided to omit the footage from the December 17 episode calling it "extremely disturbing". The clip shown in the preview for the episode in which Snooki gets punched can be seen on news sites that reported the incident prior to the episode being shown.

== Arrest of Ronnie Ortiz-Magro ==
Cast member Ronald "Ronnie" Ortiz-Magro was arrested after a fight occurred on September 4, 2009, on the boardwalk in Seaside Heights, for aggravated assault for striking Stephen Izzo with a closed fist. Izzo lost consciousness as a result. Ortiz-Magro says the other party provoked him while he was walking home with Nicole "Snooki" Polizzi and Sammi "Sweetheart" Giancola and that the other person involved in the fight was being disrespectful and shouted "racist" remarks at their African-American security guards and might have spat on him. Izzo claims that he was punched because MTV security held him back and Ortiz-Magro punched him in the back of the head.

Ortiz-Magro was charged under the name "Ronnie Ortiz". He spent a few hours in jail, had a mug shot taken, and paid $600 bail. Ortiz-Magro stated that he was not a person who likes to fight and that was acting in self-defense: "You'll see throughout the show, we do go out and if we do get into an altercation ... It's us just defending ourselves or reacting to somebody else."

On December 17, 2010, Ortiz-Magro was indicted for one count of third-degree assault, which carries a maximum sentence of five years in prison. On July 11, 2011, Ortiz-Magro was admitted to pre-trial intervention. The charge against him was dismissed, provided he stays out of trouble for eighteen months and completes community service.

== Criticism of tanning ==
Dr. Seth Forman, a dermatologist from Tampa, Florida, has criticized the show for "glamorizing" tanning: "The young adults on Jersey Shore think tanned skin is important. Some even own their own tanning bed ... It's ridiculous. I think young adults don't realize how much damage they are doing to their skin." Dr. Forman also has stated that people need to wear sunscreen every day and avoid tanning beds.

Marybeth Hicks, author of the parenting book Bringing Up Geeks, criticized Nicole "Snooki" Polizzi for stating she would change the world by installing tanning beds in every person's house during her appearance on The Jay Leno Show. Hicks has believed Polizzi could influence tweens into using tanning beds. "It's disconcerting that [she] could have any sort of influence or be a role model ... or advocate something like tanning beds that could cause cancer," she said. Hicks also criticized MTV for glorifying behaviors that she claims are dangerous, such as drinking and casual sex, for the purpose of garnering higher ratings, and believed that parents are to possess knowledge of that the show has been promoting unsafe behavior.

== Stereotyping ==
Prior to the show's debut, controversy arose over portrayals of Italian stereotypes and the cast's use of the words "guido/guidette", a slang term for a working-class urban Italian-American which is widely perceived by Italian-Americans as a pejorative word, similar to "spic" or "wop". The show also received scrutiny from locals because the cast members are not residents from the area and portray a negative stereotype of New Jersey in general.

=== Italian-American response ===
The show plays upon the stereotype of the guido, prompting criticism from groups such as the National Italian American Foundation, UNICO National, and the Order Sons of Italy in America for using "ethnic slurs, violence and poor behavior to marginalize and stereotype Italian-Americans". Prior to the premiere of the show UNICO asked MTV to cancel the show because of the apparent play on stereotypes from the promos. UNICO National President Andre DiMino said that the behavior in the promos is offensive and stereotype-promoting and that "MTV is using very pejorative terms, 'guido' and 'guidette', to promote a program and as a corporation that is not correct." After the show premiered, UNICO National claims they "can't keep up with the volume of calls" from "outraged" Italian Americans.

UNICO National President Andre DiMino said in a statement "MTV has festooned the 'bordello-like' house set with Italian flags and red, white and green maps of New Jersey while every other cutaway shot is of Italian signs and symbols. They are blatantly as well as subliminally bashing Italian-Americans with every technique possible. ... (The cast members) are an embarrassment to themselves, their heritage and their families. "

Linda Stasi, an Italian-American New York Post columnist, criticized MTV, saying that Jersey Shore is a show "... in which Italian-Americans are stereotyped (clearly at the urging of its producer) into degrading and debasing themselves—and, by extension, all Italian-Americans—and furthering the popular TV notion that Italian-Americans are gel-haired, thuggish, ignoramuses with fake tans, no manners, no diction, no taste, no education, no sexual discretion, no hairdressers (for sure), no real knowledge of Italian culture and no ambition beyond expanding steroid-and silicone-enhanced bodies into sizes best suited for floating over Macy's on Thanksgiving."

On January 10, 2010, Andre DiMino called for Jersey Shore to be canceled saying "enough is enough" and that the series isn't just an insult to Italian-Americans or Jersey Shore residents, but to everyone. Dimino claims that it has been clear from the beginning that it is MTV's intent to "ridicule, stereotype and defame Italian-Americans" and "to say to the world that this is what Italian-Americans are really like". DiMino further expresses his disgust saying that Italian-Americans continue to be the only ethnic group that it is acceptable to negatively stereotype and demean. Dimino also called MTV's removal of the terms guido and guidette from their promos and Web site a "partial victory".

On February 17, 2010, DiMino released a statement to RadarOnline.com, stating:

We have consulted attorneys and are prepared to take legal action because we are so angry about the situation. I cannot say too much right now about the actual legal steps we are going to take but we feel what MTV are doing with Jersey Shore is outrageous. The use of words like 'Guidos' and 'Guidettes' is racial stereotyping in the worst possible sense and they are portraying young Italian Americans in the worst possible light. They would not try and get away with the same tactics if it was show full of young African American or Jewish kids so why is it acceptable to portray Italian Americans in this way? There are a lot of young American Italians who serve in the community and the armed services who are ashamed of Jersey Shore and we need to stand-up for them.

Italian-American actress Alyssa Milano said she was "upset" after viewing the trailer on YouTube and would not watch the show. She subsequently appeared in a parody video from the comedy website Funny or Die undergoing a "Guidette" makeover, complete with fake tan, big-haired wig, low cut minidress, and photographically enhanced cleavage as a way of protesting how the show portrays Italian-American women.

Contrary to popular response, Italian-American New York Daily News conservative columnist S. E. Cupp believes Italian-Americans should not be mad at MTV but thankful for the company shining a spotlight on a small but real subset of the culture serving as a useful negative example for their children, stating, "Somebody needs to explain to me how it's MTV's fault that the subjects of its reality show behave like stereotypical idiots. In fact, Jersey Shore is proof that some stereotypes, while not representative, are in some cases real." Cupp also goes on to say that since the cast of the show are real people that the show's detractors are actually insulting Italian-Americans by suggesting that the cast is having fun pretending to be stereotypes.

=== Legal response ===
Senator Joseph F. Vitale, the chairman of the New Jersey Italian American Legislative Caucus, and Richard Bilotti, the chairman of the New Jersey Italian and Italian American Heritage Commission, have sent a letter to Viacom, MTV's parent company, asking them to cancel the show for its "offensive, inaccurate" portrayal of Italian-Americans. Vitale and Bilotti say the show violates, at least in spirit, New Jersey's hate and bias crime laws writing, "these acts are contrary to the spirit of New Jersey law and jeopardize the active and open pursuit of freedom and opportunity."

Senator Vitale further requested that the New Jersey Department of Labor and Workforce Development opened an investigation into employment and wage practices, as well as the tax status of the "Shore Store" where cast members worked. Officials refused to confirm whether or not a probe was taking place.

=== MTV response ===
In light of UNICO National President Andre DiMino's concerns about the show, MTV released a statement, which reads:

Jersey Shore is a reality series that follows eight young adults spending their summer at the beach. The show continues MTV's history of documenting various subcultures, rites of passage of young people, and the ways they self-identify. The Italian-American cast takes pride in their ethnicity. We understand that this show is not intended for every audience and depicts just one aspect of youth culture.

MTV's Italian-American president of programming, Tony DiSanto, stated that "The cast takes pride in their ethnicity ... In fact, it is a key driver of how they bond with each other and self-identify. They refer to themselves as 'guidos' in a positive manner." DiSanto also said, "We want to make breakout shows that will get people talking about us ... It's pure entertainment, dramatic, engaging and comedic" MTV has since refrained from using the terms "guido" and "guidette" in promo clips and on their web site after being confronted by UNICO National President Andre DiMino prior to the series debut.

FoxNews.com reported that the MTV building in Times Square received threatening emails, abusive phone calls, and hurtful Facebook messages, mainly directed at staff members involved with the press for the show, and were hiring more security as a result. A spokesperson for MTV responded to the rumors saying that everything was fine at their headquarters and MTV "has not received any death threats."

=== Cast response ===
Various members of the cast defended the show prior to airing saying to give the show a chance, with Mike Sorrentino saying, "it's not necessarily a stereotype; it's just how it is ... in New York and New Jersey, that just happens to be the style."

Sammi "Sweetheart" Giancola said prior to the shows debut:

It's just people living life on the show ... that's it ... We shouldn't judge, because everybody's their own person. I feel, as an Italian-American, I understand their ways. People are what they are ... and that's the way it is.

When Nicole "Snooki" Polizzi was on The Wendy Williams Show she responded to the criticism saying:

The Italian, whatever, national, whatever their organization is, they don't understand that 'guidos' and 'guidettes' are good-looking people that, you know, like to make a scene and be center of attention and just take care of themselves ... They are old-fashioned. They don't know that; they think it's offensive, because maybe in their time it was offensive, but now it's kind of a compliment. So they don't understand that and that is what we are trying to say. They are way overreacting to the show. We're 22 to 29 just having fun at the shore. They are just taking it way out of proportion.

During the reunion special, the cast members rejected the notion that there was anything shameful about being a guido, with Paul "DJ Pauly D" DelVecchio saying, "I don't represent all Italians.. I only represent myself."

== Sponsor boycotts ==
Domino's Pizza and American Family Insurance pulled their commercial advertisements after the debut episode of the show. In response, MTV said in a statement, "Jersey Shore may not be for every sponsor or advertiser and we understand that." Domino's stated that they didn't have a problem with MTV but that the content of the show wasn't right for them. Tim McIntyre, Domino's vice president of communications, stated, "One of the ads happened to show up and once we saw what the program was, we decided that the content wasn't in keeping with what we're all about."

In response to Polizzi's comments about the advertisers, a rep for Domino's reiterated the company's previous statement saying,

We have no issue with MTV or the programming it airs ... Just like viewers have a choice of what they want to watch, advertisers have a choice on what shows they want to advertise. We didn't pull a penny from MTV ... We love what they do. We never made any critical commentary. It was a 30-second call, and MTV said, 'OK,' and that was it.

Dell also pulled its ads during the airing of the show, becoming the third company to do so, saying they will "block" their commercials and that they don't "condone or support ethnic bashing in any form."

UNICO National, who had previously criticized the show, later criticized several sponsors, including Papa John's Pizza, Nivea, LG Electronics, and Burger King, for supporting "such a discriminatory, insulting and Italian-bashing program." UNICO president Andre DiMino added, "I am urging our supporters to call these sponsors and demand they pull their advertising from Jersey Shore." UNICO has no plans to stop pressuring sponsors to boycott the show.

BeenVerified.com, a company that does criminal background checks, rushed over to MTV to take the vacant advertising slots beginning December 10, after Domino's and American Family Insurance pulled their ads. A representative for the company stated, "We may not be hair gel product, but we feel the program's content reinforces our brand's message perfectly."

The popularity of the show leading up to season two has caused the advertisers response to change. While speaking to analysts about its second quarter financial results, Viacom Chief Executive Philippe Dauman stated that "there were some issues when 'Jersey Shore's' first season launched," but "now we have advertisers scrambling to get on it."

When Polizzi was asked about the advertisers pulling their ads she responded, "I just have one thing to say to Domino's, Dell, UNICO and all the other haters out there, Fuck you! If you don't want to watch, don't watch. Just shut the hell up! I'm serious ... Fuck you!" In response, UNICO said in a statement "She is not an embarrassment to Italian Americans – she is actually an embarrassment to the entire human race!!!!" A rep for Domino's said in response, "Our first response was, 'What a classy young lady—her parents must be so proud ... There's no need to get into a war with this young girl, because tick-tock, her fifteen minutes are almost up."

== Local protests ==
The show has been protested against by residents and businesses in the Jersey Shore area for casting what they believe is a negative light on the region. The Jersey Shore Convention and Visitors Bureau said that "MTV is providing a one-dimensional, dramatized version of a very small group of visitors' summer experiences in one Jersey shore town."

Seaside Heights Borough officials have issued a statement distancing themselves from the show stating, "the governing body wants it to be known that they did not solicit, promote or participate in the filming of this show," and that "... the borough does not condone any discriminatory remarks against Italian Americans, domestic violence or the promiscuous and otherwise bad behavior portrayed on the show, the people on the show are certainly not indicative of the majority of those who visit, and enjoy the Jersey shore and Seaside Heights every summer."

Some local residents have a different take on the show. Mike Carbone, manager of The Beachcomber Bar where female cast member Nicole "Snooki" Polizzi was punched in the face, said that critics should quiet down, stating, "some people are like, 'Oh, my God, look how dumb this makes New Jersey look,' but it's not even a show about New Jersey. It's about people who come down to the Jersey shore."

However, most casual viewers of the show are unaware that the majority of the cast comes from New York. As a result, many out-of-staters are associating New Jerseyans with the "Jersey Shore" stereotype even more-so than they used to. This has resulted in a backlash amongst New Jersey natives against the show. Several prominent figures have spoken out against the series for this reason, including New Jersey governor Chris Christie.

In August 2011, clothing retailer Abercrombie & Fitch offered Mike "The Situation" Sorrentino and other cast members of Jersey Shore a "substantial payment" if they stopped wearing Abercrombie-branded clothes, stating "We are deeply concerned that Mr. Sorrentino's association with our brand could cause significant damage to our image." In November 2011, Sorrentino filed a lawsuit against A&F after the company made shirts that read "The Fitchuation" and "GTL ... You Know The Deal."

== Public opinion ==
Polling indicated strongly negative reactions to the show among some New Jersey residents. According to a national study in the spring 2010 conducted by Fairleigh Dickinson University's PublicMind, the show promotes the image of the state. Respondents who have watched the show tend to have a more positive view of the state than those who have not. Three in every five respondents who have watched the show have a favorable view of the state, compared to one in every five respondents who have seen the show and have an unfavorable view of the state. Dr. Daniel Cassino, professor of political science at Fairleigh Dickinson University commented on the poll results: "While we can't be sure that 'Jersey Shore' is making people like New Jersey more, it certainly does not seem to be hurting it."

In order to corroborate the results of the study, Fairleigh Dickinson University's PublicMind replicated the design in a second national poll in 2011. The results remained constant: 43% of adults who had watched the show had a favorable view of the state, while 41% of adults who had not watched the show had a favorable view. Dr. Peter J. Woolley, executive director of PublicMind added; "These measures alone suggest the show isn't hurting the nations view of the state. In fact, it may be promoting one of the states best features – not Snooki, but the shore itself." Researchers also noted that those who had seen the show, and who were asked whether they had seen the show before being asked their opinion of New Jersey, were more likely than any other group to have a favorable view of the state. The FDU researchers constructed the poll so that half were asked their opinion of New Jersey first and half were asked if they had seen the show first.

== Transgender portrayal during reunion show ==
The show elicited controversy when during the Jersey Shore reunion show, cast member Mike "The Situation" Sorrentino was shown in outtakes flirting and "making out" with a woman in a nightclub who was alleged to be transgender. Multiple cast members on the panel, as well as host Julissa Bermudez, repeatedly referred to the woman as a "tranny", which is a slur for transgender women, while making fun of the woman and "The Situation" for being in that situation with her. LGBT rights organization GLAAD called out MTV and Jersey Shore for using "a dehumanizing and derogatory slur" and said that the incident "requires a swift and genuine public apology." MTV later apologized for airing the offensive segment.
