= Italian American One Voice Coalition =

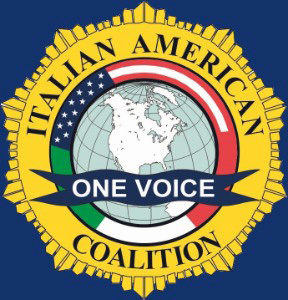
- 'Italian American One Voice Coalition'

The Italian American One Voice Coalition is a nationwide anti-bias organization that defends Italian American heritage and combats all forms of bigotry through information, education, legislation, and advocacy. Its goal is to project a united front in dealing with defamation, discrimination and negative stereotyping of Italian American culture and heritage. It is the only national Italian American organization of its type.

== History ==
The 'Italian American One Voice Coalition' was founded by Dr. Manny Alfano, and consists of thousands of activists across the country.

== Mission ==
The mission of the Italian American One Voice Coalition is to protect the rightful representation of Italian Americans in American society and all other peoples whose heritage is damaged by unacceptable and worn out ethnic stereotyping in media, politics, the arts and elsewhere.

== Leadership ==
Founding Italian American One Voice Coalition President Manny Alfano dedicated himself to defending, promoting and preserving Italian American heritage and culture. He has spoken out against movies like "Don Jon," shows such as "Jersey Shore," various commercials and productions, instances and articles in which Italian Americans are negatively portrayed. He died on June 21, 2022.

After the passing of Dr. Emanuele Alfano, Andre' DiMino became President and continues to represent the organization on TV and radio interviews in furtherance of the mission to defend Italian American heritage, culture and civil rights.

== Activities ==
The Italian American One Voice Coalition stands ready to combat negative Italian American stereotyping through informational meetings, functions and protests against media outlets that continue to portray Italian culture in a bad light. It also actively recruits members who are ready and willing to raise awareness of instances of Italian American bias and discrimination. The Italian American One Voice Coalition has also created the first-ever nationwide "rapid response" network of defenders who respond quickly to instances of Italian American bias and stereotyping through emails, letters, phone calls and through social media.

In recent years, the group has made a focus of its activities opposing efforts to eliminate Columbus Day as a federal holiday, and criticizing what it views as Italian-American slurs in popular culture.

== Associations ==
The Italian American One Voice Coalition works closely with other major Italian American organizations including UNICO National, NIAF and OSIA and The NJ Italian Heritage Commission . ONE VOICE also issues a regular email newsletter. '"The Alfano Digest”' is delivered to more than five thousand people and Italian American organizations nationwide. It is published by ONE VOICE founder and Chair, Manny Alfano. The Digest issues alerts on instances of bias, stereotyping, discrimination and defamation and activates a network of Italian American ONE VOICE "defenders" who respond with calls, emails, faxes, letters and demonstrations when necessary. The Digest also contains interesting and informative Italian American cultural and heritage news and information.

== Recent successes ==
Some of ONE VOICE's successes have included having companies such as Ally Financial, Muller Insurance and various car dealerships across the country remove commercials defaming Italian Americans. ONE VOICE obtained an apology from Chrysler CEO Sergio Marchionne for making an insulting remark about Italians. ONE VOICE has worked to have small businesses remove offensive items to Italian Americans. ONE VOICE also fought to re-instate Columbus Day as a holiday in the Paterson, NJ School District; successfully lobbied the New Jersey Governor to revoke state tax credits given to the producers of MTV's Jersey Shore; joined with the Ancient Order of Hibernians to stop cartoonist Thomas Nast from being inducted into the New Jersey Hall of Fame because of his overly ethnic cartoons; and helped to prevent Jersey Shore from filming in Hoboken, NJ.

== See also ==
- Controversies of Jersey Shore
- Unico National
