= Gvidas =

- Gender: Male
- Language: Lithuanian
- Name day: 12 September

Origin
- Origin: Proto-Germanic or Latin
- Meaning: "forest borderline" (Proto-Germanic) or "life" (Latin)
- Region of origin: Lithuania

Other names
- Related names: Vitus, Guido, Vito, Guy, Veit

Gvidas is a Lithuanian masculine given name. The name possibly derives from the ancient Germanic root "widu" or "wido", meaning "forest borderline", or the Latin "vīta", which means "life". Individuals bearing the name Gvidas include:

- Gvidas Gineitis (born 2004), Lithuanian footballer
- Gvidas Juška (born 1982), Lithuanian footballer
- Gvidas Sabeckis (born 1984), Lithuanian tennis player
