= Guido (slang) =

Derogatory term for working-class Italian Americans

Guido (/ˈɡwiːdoʊ/, Italian: [ˈɡwiːdo]) is a North American subculture, slang term, and ethnic slur referring to working-class urban Italian-Americans. The guido stereotype is multi-faceted. More recently, it has come to refer to working-class urban Italian-Americans who conduct themselves in an overtly macho manner or belong to a particular working-class urban Italian-American subculture. The time period in which it obtained the latter meaning is not clear, but some sources date it to the 1970s or 1980s. The term is not used in Italy.

== Etymology ==
The word "guido" is derived from the Italian given name "Guido", originally the Italian version of the French given name Guy. Fishermen of Italian descent were often called "Guidos" in medieval times.

== Contentious use ==
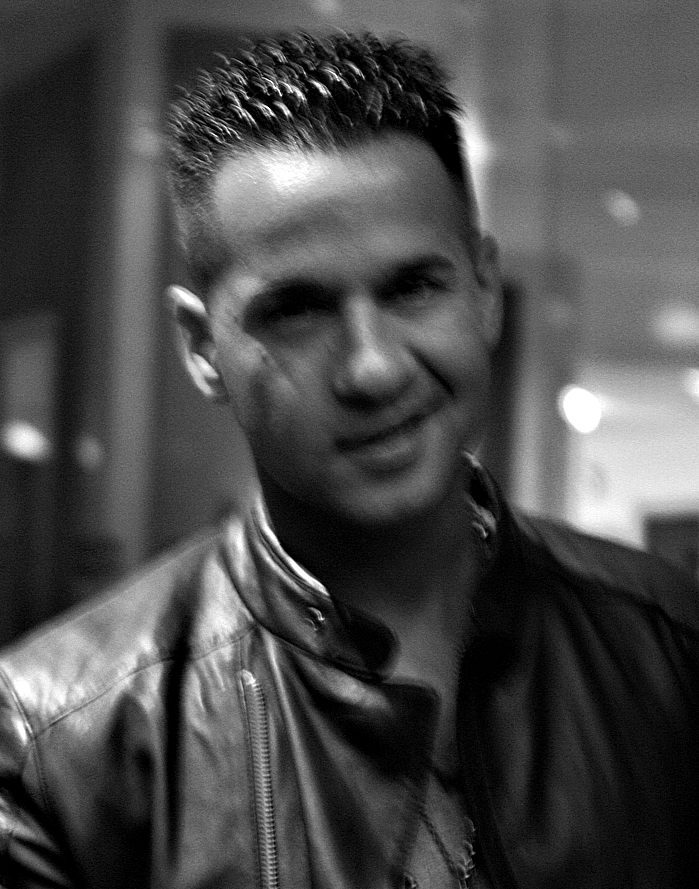
Self-proclaimed guido Michael "The Situation" Sorrentino from Jersey Shore, wearing typical clothing associated with the subculture: gold chain, black leather jacket, and quiff.

The term is used in states and metropolitan areas associated with large Italian-American populations, such as New York City, New Jersey, Connecticut, Buffalo, Chicago, Detroit, Ohio, Pittsburgh, Philadelphia, Boston, and Providence. In other areas, terms such as "Cugine" (Brooklyn, especially in Bensonhurst), "Mario" (Chicago) and "Gino" (Toronto) have a meaning similar to guido. Although some Italians self-identify as "guidos", the term is often considered derogatory or an ethnic slur. It is similar to the term Wog, used in Britain and Australia.

MTV caused controversy in 2009 when they used the term in promotions for the reality television show Jersey Shore. This spurred objections from Italian-American organizations such as Unico National, NIAF, the Order Sons of Italy in America, and the Internet watchdog organization ItalianAware. Although MTV removed the term from some promotions, it remains closely associated with the show, and some of the cast members use it regularly to describe themselves while the females sometimes refer to themselves as a "guidette",.

According to author and professor Pellegrino D'Acierno, "guido" is a derogatory term for stereotypical working class or lower class Italian-American males and "a pejorative term applied to lower-class, [Italian-American], macho, gold-amulet-wearing, self-displaying neighborhood boys [...] [with a] penchant for cruising in hot cars [...] Guidette is their gum-chewing, big-haired, air-headed female counterpart". In regards to the "guido" stereotype and the depiction of working class Italian-American communities in American film, Peter Bondanella contends that: "Although some films view the working class as a potentially noble and dignified group, others see the working-class Italian American as a Guido or Guidette - part of a tasteless, uneducated […] group of characters with vulgar gold chains, big hair, and abrasive manners."

== Style ==
Clothing often associated with the "Guido" stereotype includes gold chains and bracelets (often herringbone chains, figaro chains, rope chains, cornicellos, or saints' medallions), pinky rings, oversized gold or silver crucifixes; rosaries worn as necklaces, working class clothing such as plain white T-shirts, muscle shirts, sleeveless undershirts or "guinea Ts"; leather jackets; sweat or tracksuits; coppola caps or scally caps; unbuttoned or open dress shirts, especially paired with sleeveless undershirts; Italian knit shirts or Camp shirts; designer brand T-shirts such as Armani, and often typical Southern Italian "tamarro" or "truzzo" club dress. Slicked-back hair and pompadours, blowouts, tapers, quiffs, fades and heavily pomaded hair are also common stereotypes.

== See also ==
- Ars (slang)
- Greaser (subculture)
- Guappo
- Jersey Shore (TV series)
- Kiss Me, Guido
- List of ethnic slurs
- List of ethnic slurs by ethnicity
- Related slurs:
  - Dago
  - Goombah
  - Guinea
  - Wop
