= Anti-Italian sentiment =

Discrimination against the Italian people

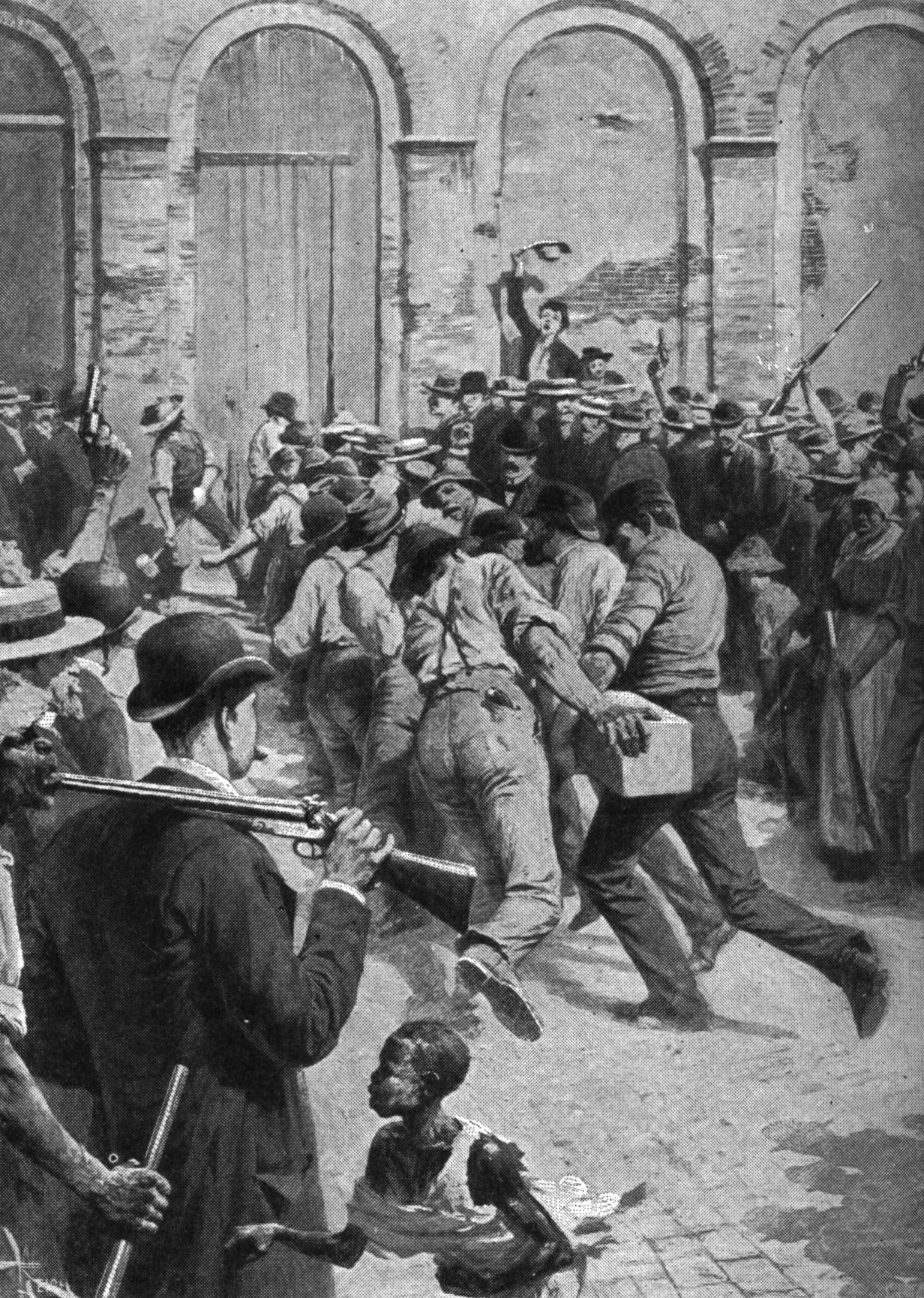
Illustration of rioters breaking into parish prison, during the 1891 lynchings in New Orleans

Anti-Italianism or Italophobia is a negative attitude regarding Italians or people with Italian ancestry, often expressed through the use of prejudice, discrimination or stereotypes. Often stemming from xenophobia, anti-Catholic sentiment and job security issues, it manifested itself in varying degrees in a number of countries to which Italians had immigrated in large numbers in the late 19th and early 20th centuries, and after WWII. Its opposite is Italophilia, which is admiration of Italy, its people, and its culture.

== In the United States ==
Anti-Italianism arose among some Americans as an effect of the large-scale immigration of Italians to the United States during the late 19th and early 20th centuries. The majority of Italian immigrants to the United States arrived in waves in the early 20th century, many of them from agrarian backgrounds. Nearly all the Italian immigrants were Catholic, as opposed to the nation's Protestant majority. Because the immigrants often lacked formal education and competed with earlier immigrants for lower-paying jobs and housing, significant hostility developed toward them.

In reaction to the large-scale immigration from Southern Europe and Eastern Europe, the United States Congress passed legislation (Emergency Quota Act of 1921 and Immigration Act of 1924) severely restricting immigration from those regions, but putting comparatively fewer restrictions on immigration from Northern European countries.

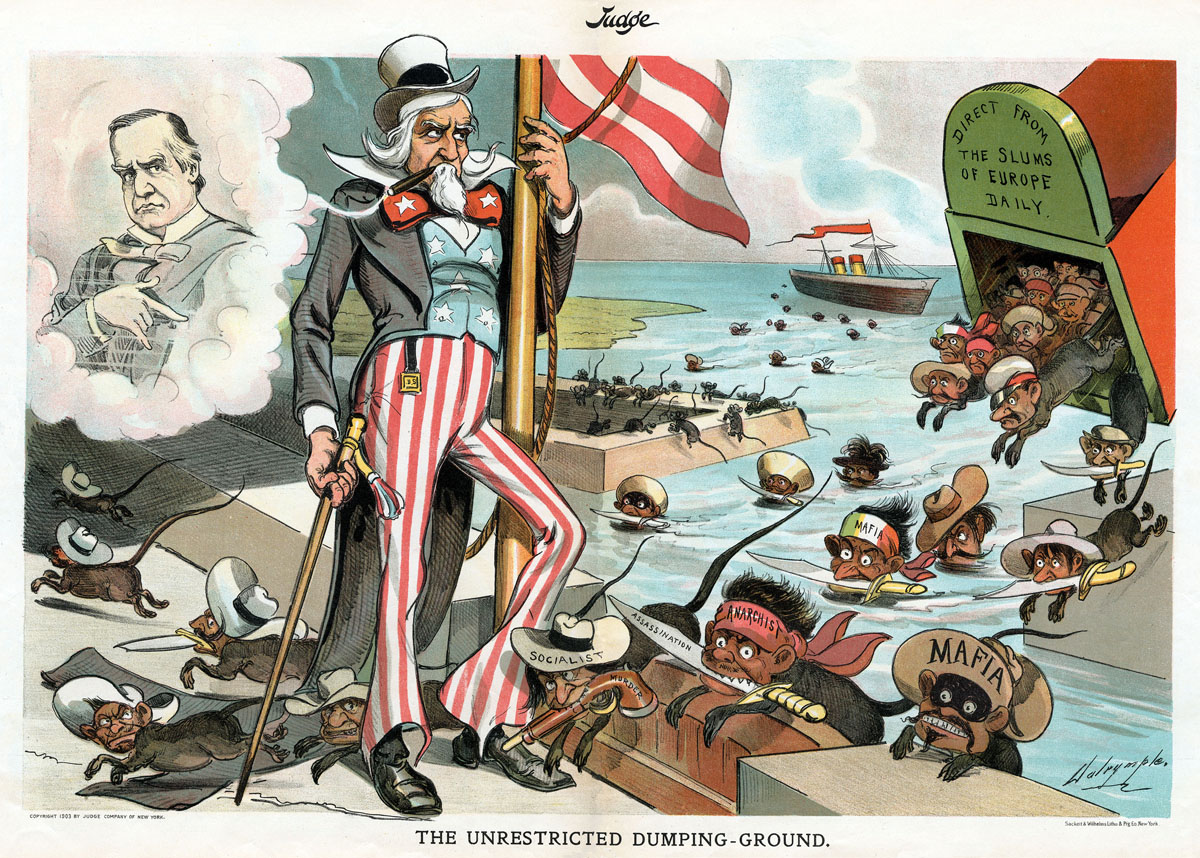
Anti-Italian cartoon by Louis Dalrymple depicting Italian immigrants as rats carrying mafia, socialism and anarchy. Published on Judge magazine, 1903

Anti-Italian prejudice was sometimes associated with the anti-Catholic tradition that existed in the United States, which was inherited as a result of Protestant/Catholic European competition and wars, which had been fought between Protestants and Catholics over the preceding three centuries. When the United States was founded, it inherited the anti-Catholic, anti-papal animosity of its original Protestant settlers. Anti-Catholic sentiments in the U.S. reached a peak in the 19th century, when the Protestant population became alarmed by the large number of Catholics who were immigrating to the United States from Ireland and Germany. The resulting anti-Catholic nativist movement, achieved prominence in the 1840s and 1850s. It had largely faded away before the Italians arrived in large numbers after 1880. The Italian immigrants, unlike some of the other Catholic immigrant groups, generally did not bring with them priests and other religious figures who could help ease their transition into American life. To remedy this situation, Pope Leo XIII dispatched a contingent of priests, nuns and brothers of the Missionaries of Saint Charles Borromeo and other orders (among which was Sister Francesca Cabrini), who helped establish hundreds of parishes to serve the needs of the Italian communities, such as Our Lady of Pompeii in New York City.

Some of the early 20th-century immigrants from Italy brought with them a political disposition toward anarchism. This was a reaction to the economic and political conditions which they had experienced in Italy. Such men as Arturo Giovannitti, Carlo Tresca, and Joe Ettor were at the forefront of organising Italians and other immigrant laborers in demanding better working conditions and shorter working hours in the mining, textile, garment, construction and other industries. These efforts often resulted in strikes, which sometimes erupted into violence between the strikers and strike-breakers. Italians were often strikebreakers. The anarchy movement in the United States at that time was responsible for bombings in major cities, and attacks on officials and law enforcement. As a result of the association of some with the labour and anarchy movements, Italian Americans were branded as "labor agitators" and radicals by many of the business owners and the upper class of the time, which resulted in further anti-Italian sentiment.

The vast majority of Italian immigrants worked hard and lived honest lives, as documented by police statistics of the early 20th century in Boston and New York City. Italian immigrants had an arrest rate that was no greater than those of other major immigrant groups. As late as 1963, James W. Vander Zander noted that the rate of criminal convictions among Italian immigrants was less than that among American-born whites.

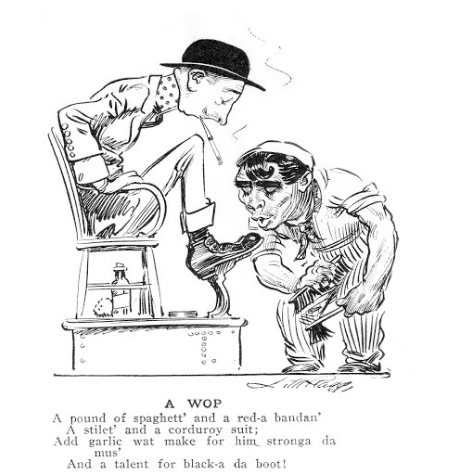
A satirical cartoon published in 1911 on Life Magazine which negatively portrays an Italian immigrant addressed with the derogatory term "wop"

A criminal element that was active in some of the Italian immigrant communities in the large eastern cities used extortion, intimidation and threats in order to extract protection money from the wealthier immigrants and shop owners (known as the Black Hand racket), and it was also involved in other illegal activities as well. When the Fascists came to power in Italy, they made the destruction of the Mafia in Sicily a high priority. Hundreds fled to the United States in the 1920s and 1930s in order to avoid prosecution.

When the United States enacted prohibition in 1920, the restrictions proved to be an economic windfall for those in the Italian-American community who were already involved in illegal activities, as well as those who had fled from Sicily. They smuggled liquor into the country, wholesaled and sold it through a network of outlets and speakeasies. While members of other ethnic groups were also deeply involved in these illegal bootlegging activities, and the associated violence between groups, Italian Americans were among the most notorious. Because of this, Italians became associated with the prototypical gangster in the minds of many, which had a long-lasting effect on the Italian-American image.

The experiences of Italian immigrants in North American countries were notably different from those in South American countries, where many of them immigrated in large numbers. Italians were key in developing countries such as: Argentina, Brazil, Chile, Uruguay and Venezuela. They quickly joined the middle and upper classes in those countries. In the U.S., Italian Americans initially encountered an established Protestant-majority Northern European culture. For a time, they were viewed mainly as construction and industrial workers, chefs, plumbers, or other blue collar workers. Like the Irish before them, many entered police and fire departments of major cities.

=== Violence against Italians ===
After the American Civil War, during the labour shortage that occurred as the South converted to free labour, planters in southern states recruited Italians to come to the United States and work, mainly as agricultural workers and labourers. Many soon found themselves the victims of prejudice and economic exploitation, and they were sometimes victims of violence. Anti-Italian stereotypes abounded during this period as a means of justifying the maltreatment of immigrants. The plight of the Italian immigrant agricultural workers in Mississippi was so serious that the Italian embassy became involved in investigating their mistreatment in cases that were studied for peonage. Later waves of Italian immigrants inherited these same virulent forms of discrimination and stereotyping which, by then, had become ingrained in the American consciousness. In the 1890s, more than 20 Italians were lynched in the United States.

One of the largest mass-lynching in American history was the mass-lynching of eleven Italians in New Orleans, Louisiana, in 1891. The city had been the destination for numerous Italian immigrants. Nineteen Italians who were thought to have assassinated police chief David Hennessy were arrested and held in the Parish Prison. Nine were tried, resulting in six acquittals and three mistrials. The next day, a mob stormed the prison and killed eleven men, none of whom had been convicted, and some of whom had not been tried. Afterward, the police arrested hundreds of Italian immigrants, on the false pretext that they were all criminals. Teddy Roosevelt, not yet president, famously said the lynching was indeed "a rather good thing". John M. Parker helped organize the lynch mob, and in 1911 was elected as governor of Louisiana. He described Italians as "just a little worse than the Negro, being if anything filthier in their habits, lawless, and treacherous".

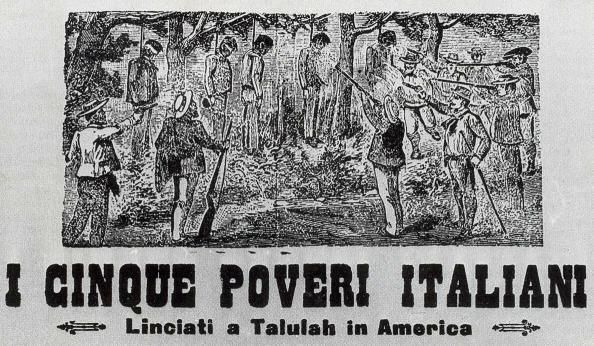
Songsheet about the 1899 lynching of Italians in Tallulah. Published on the Huffington Post

In 1899, in Tallulah, Louisiana, three Italian-American shopkeepers were lynched because they had treated blacks in their shops the same as whites. A vigilante mob hanged five Italian Americans: the three shopkeepers and two bystanders.

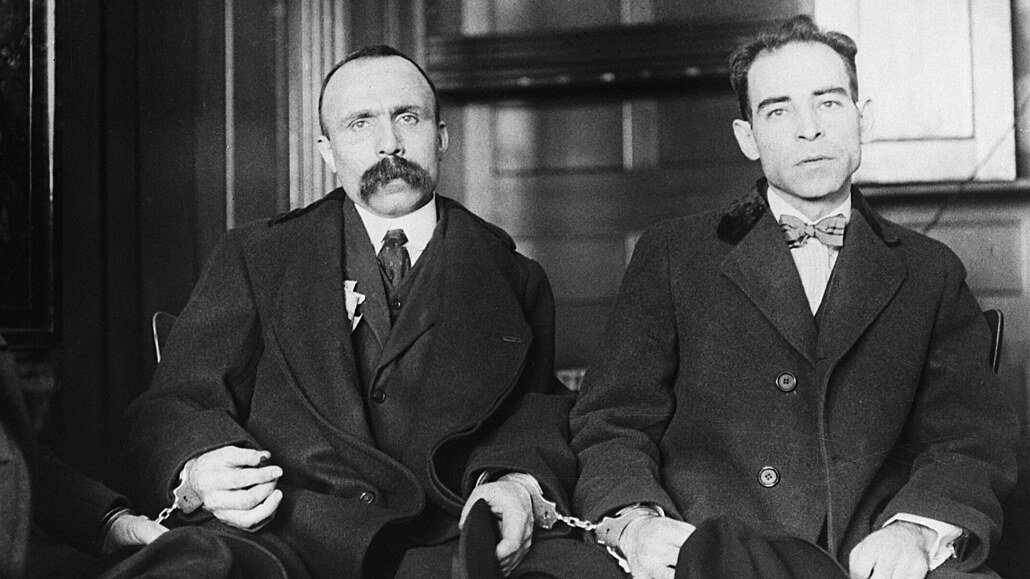
Anarchist trial defendants Sacco and Vanzetti in handcuffs

In 1920 two Italian immigrants, Sacco and Vanzetti, were tried for robbery and murder in Braintree, Massachusetts. Many historians agree that Sacco and Vanzetti were subjected to a mishandled trial, and the judge, jury, and prosecution were biased against them because of their anarchist political views and Italian immigrant status. Judge Webster Thayer called Sacco and Vanzetti "Bolsheviki!" and said he would "get them good and proper". In 1924 Thayer confronted a Massachusetts lawyer: "Did you see what I did with those anarchistic bastards the other day?", the judge said. Despite worldwide protests, Sacco and Vanzetti were eventually executed. Massachusetts Governor Michael Dukakis declared August 23, 1977, the 50th anniversary of their execution, as Nicola Sacco and Bartolomeo Vanzetti Memorial Day. His proclamation, issued in English and Italian, stated that Sacco and Vanzetti had been unfairly tried and convicted and that "any disgrace should be forever removed from their names". He did not pardon them, because that would imply they were guilty.

In the 1930s, Italian and Jewish stores were among those affected by Sufi Abdul Hamid's general boycott against white-owned businesses in Harlem, which was motivated largely by the perception that they discriminated against Black workers and customers.

Anti-Italianism was part of the anti-immigrant, anti-Catholic ideology of the revived Ku Klux Klan (KKK) after 1915; the white supremacist and nativist group targeted Italians and other Southern Europeans, seeking to preserve the supposed dominance of White Anglo-Saxon Protestants. During the early 20th century, the KKK became active in northern and midwestern cities, where social change had been rapid due to immigration and industrialization. It was not limited to the South. It reached a peak of membership and influence in 1925. A hotbed of anti-Italian KKK activity developed in South Jersey in the mid-1920s. In 1933, there was a mass protest against Italian immigrants in Vineland, New Jersey, where Italians made up 20% of the city population. The KKK eventually lost all of its power in Vineland and left the city.

=== Anti-Italian-American stereotyping ===
Since the early 20th century, Italian-Americans have been portrayed with stereotypes. Hostility was often directed toward the large numbers of southern Italians and Sicilians who began arriving in the U.S. after 1880. Italian-Americans in contemporary American society have actively objected to pervasive negative stereotyping in the mass media. Stereotyping of Italian-Americans being associated with the Mafia has been a consistent feature of movies such as The Godfather series, Goodfellas, and Casino, and television series such as prohibition-era's The Untouchables, and The Sopranos, which itself explored the concept by featuring non-Mafia Italian-Americans expressing concern at the Mafia's effect on their community's public image.

Such stereotypes of Italian-Americans are reinforced by the frequent replay of these movies and series on cable and network TV. Video and board games, and TV and radio commercials with Mafia themes also reinforce this stereotype. The entertainment media has stereotyped the Italian-American community as tolerant of violent, sociopathic gangsters. Other notable stereotypes portray Italian-Americans as overly aggressive and prone to violence. MTV's series Jersey Shore was considered offensive by the Italian-American group UNICO.

A comprehensive study of Italian-American culture on film, conducted from 1996 to 2001, by the Italic Institute of America, revealed the extent of stereotyping in media. More than two-thirds of the 2,000 films assessed in the study portray Italian-Americans in a negative light. Nearly 300 films featuring Italian-Americans as mobsters have been produced since The Godfather (1972), an average of nine per year.

According to the Italic Institute of America, "The mass media has consistently ignored five centuries of Italian American history and has elevated what was never more than a minute subculture to the dominant Italian American culture."

According to 2015 FBI statistics, Italian-American organized crime members and associates number approximately 3,000. Given an Italian-American population estimated to be approximately 18 million, the study concludes that only one in 6,000 is active in organized crime.

=== Italian-American organizations ===
National organizations which have been active in combatting media stereotyping and defamation of Italian Americans are: Order Sons of Italy in America, Unico National, Columbus Citizens Foundation, National Italian American Foundation and the Italic Institute of America. Four Internet-based organizations are: Annotico Report, the Italian-American Discussion Network, ItalianAware and the Italian American One Voice Coalition.

=== Columbus Day ===
Decisions by states and municipalities across the United States to change Columbus Day to Indigenous People's Day have been claimed by some commentators to be an attack on Italian Americans and their history, including anti-Italian discrimination. In California, the Italian Cultural Society of Sacramento proclaimed that, "Indigenous Peoples Day is viewed by Italian Americans and other Americans as anti-Columbus Day." Other Italian-American groups, such as Italian Americans for Indigenous People's Day, have welcomed the change and asserted that it is not anti-Italian.

== In the United Kingdom ==
An early manifestation of anti-Italianism in Britain was in 1820, at the time when King George IV sought to dissolve his marriage to Caroline of Brunswick. A sensational proceeding, the Pains and Penalties Bill 1820, was held at the House of Lords in an effort to prove Caroline's adultery; since she had been living in Italy, many prosecution witnesses were from among her servants. The prosecution's reliance on Italian witnesses of low repute led to anti-Italian sentiment in Britain. The witnesses had to be protected from angry mobs, and were depicted in popular prints and pamphlets as venal, corrupt and criminal. Street-sellers sold prints alleging that the Italians had accepted bribes to commit perjury.

Anti-Italianism broke out again, in a more sustained way, a century later. After Benito Mussolini's alliance with Nazi Germany in the late 1930s, there was a growing hostility towards Italy in the United Kingdom. The British media ridiculed the Italian capacity to fight in a war, pointing to the poor state of the Italian military during its imperialistic phase. A comic strip, which began running in 1938 in the British comic The Beano, was entitled "Musso the Wop". The strip featured Mussolini as an arrogant buffoon.

Wigs on the Green was a novel by Nancy Mitford first published in 1935. It was a merciless satire of British fascism and the Italians living in the United Kingdom who supported it. The book is notable for lampooning the political enthusiasms of Mitford's sister Diana Mosley, and her links with some Italians in Great Britain who promoted the British Union of Fascists of Oswald Mosley. Furthermore, the announcement of Benito Mussolini's decision to side with Adolf Hitler's Germany in the spring of 1940 caused an immediate response. By order of Parliament, all enemy aliens were to be interned, although there were few active Italian fascists. This anti-Italian feeling led to a night of nationwide riots against the Italian communities in June 1940. The Italians were now seen as a national security threat linked to the feared British Fascism movement, and Winston Churchill gave instructions to "collar the lot!". Thousands of Italian men between the ages of 17 and 60 were arrested after his speech.

== World War II ==
Adolf Hitler acknowledged the ancient history of the Roman civilization. He regarded the Italians as more artistic but less industrious than the Germanic population. In the interbellum period, Germans believed the Kingdom of Italy had "stabbed them in the back" by joining the "Big Four" in the Treaty of London. Hitler never made any speech denouncing Italy for this, instead worked on forging an alliance with a fellow Fascist regime.

Because many writers have uncritically repeated stereotypes shared by their sources, biases and prejudices have taken on the status of objective observations, including the idea that the Germans and British were the only belligerents in the Mediterranean after Italian setbacks in early 1941. Sadkovich questioned this point of view in Of Myths and Men and The Italian Navy, but persistent stereotypes, including that of the incompetent Italian, are well entrenched in the literature, from Puleston's early The Influence of Sea Power, to Gooch's Italian Military Incompetence, to more recent publications by Mack Smith, Knox and Sullivan. Wartime bias in early British and American histories, which focused on German operations, dismissed Italian forces as inept and or unimportant and viewed Germany as the pivotal power in Europe during the interwar period.

— Loyd E. Lee and Robin D. S. Higham, World War II in Europe, Africa, and the Americas, with General Sources: A Handbook of Literature and Research. Greenwood Publishing Group, 1997. ISBN 0-313-29325-2 (pp. 141–142).

During the Second World War, the United States and the United Kingdom designated Italian citizens living in their countries as alien, irrespective of how long they had lived there. Hundreds of Italian citizens, suspected by ethnicity of potential loyalty to Fascist Italy, were put in internment camps in the United States and Canada. Thousands more Italian citizens in the U.S., suspected of loyalty to Italy, were placed under surveillance. Joe DiMaggio's father, who lived in San Francisco, had his boat and house confiscated. Unlike Japanese Americans, Italian Americans and Italian Canadians never received reparations from their respective governments, but President Bill Clinton made a public declaration admitting the U.S. government's misjudgement in the internment.

Because of the Italian conquest of Ethiopia and Italy's alliance with Nazi Germany, in the United Kingdom popular feeling developed against all the Italians in the country. Many Italian nationals were deported as enemy aliens, with some being killed by German submarines torpedoing the transportation ships.

During the Second World War, much Allied propaganda was directed against Italian military performance, usually expressing a stereotype of the "incompetent Italian soldier". Historians have documented that the Italian Army suffered major defeats due to its being poorly prepared for major combat as a result of Mussolini's refusal to heed warnings by Italian Army commanders. Objective World War II accounts show that, despite having to rely in many cases on outdated weapons, Italian troops frequently fought with great valor and distinction, especially well trained and equipped units such as the Bersaglieri, Paratroopers and Alpini.

Bias includes both implicit assumptions, evident in Knox's title The Sources of Italy's Defeat in 1940: Bluff or Institutionalized Incompetence?, and the selective use of sources. Also see Sullivan's The Italian Armed Forces. Sims, in The Fighter Pilot, ignored the Italians, while D'Este in World War II in the Mediterranean shaped his reader's image of Italians by citing a German comment that Italy's surrender was "the basest treachery". Further, he discussed Allied and German commanders but ignored Messe, who commanded the Italian First Army, which held off both the U.S. Second Corps and the British Eighth Army in Tunisia.

In his article, Anglo-American Bias and the Italo-Greek War (1994), Sadkovich writes:

Knox and other Anglo-American historians have not only selectively used Italian sources, but they have also gleaned negative observations and racist slurs and comments from British, American, and German sources and then presented them as objective depictions of Italian political and military leaders, a game that if played in reverse would yield some interesting results regarding German, American, and British competence.

Sadkovich also states that

such a fixation on Germany and such denigrations of Italians not only distort analysis, but they also reinforce the misunderstandings and myths that have grown up around the Greek theater and allow historians to lament and debate the impact of the Italo-Greek conflict on the British and German war efforts, yet dismiss as unimportant its impact on the Italian war effort. Because Anglo-American authors start from the assumption that Italy's war effort was secondary in importance to that of Germany, they implicitly, if unconsciously, deny even the possibility of a 'parallel war' long before Italian setbacks in late 1940, because they define Italian policy as subordinate to German from the very beginning of the war. Alan Levine even goes most authors one better by dismissing the whole Mediterranean theater as irrelevant, but only after duly scolding Mussolini for 'his imbecilic attack on Greece'.

== After World War II ==
Former Italian communities once thrived in Italy's African colonies of Eritrea, Somalia and Libya, and in the areas at the borders of the Kingdom of Italy. In the aftermath of the end of imperial colonies and other political changes, many ethnic Italians were violently expelled from these areas, or left under threat of violence.

=== Libya ===
In Libya, during its years as an Italian colony, some 150,000 Italians settled there, constituting about 18% of the total population. During the rise of independence movements, hostility increased against colonists. All of Libya's remaining ethnic Italians were expelled from Libya in 1970, a year after Muammar Gaddafi seized power: Day of Revenge on 7 October 1970. Later, it was renamed the Day of Friendship because of improvement in Italy–Libya relations.

=== Yugoslavia ===
At the end of World War II, former Italian territories in Istria and Dalmatia became part of Yugoslavia by the Treaty of Peace with Italy, 1947. Economic insecurity, ethnic hatred and the international political context that eventually led to the Iron Curtain resulted in up to 350,000 people, nearly all ethnic Italians, choosing to or being forced to leave the region during Josip Broz Tito's rule. Scholars such as Rudolph Rummel note that the number of Dalmatian Italians has dropped from 45,000 in 1848, when they comprised nearly 10% of the total Dalmatian population under Austria-Hungary, to 300 in modern times, related to democide and ethnic cleansing, although much criticism has been raised regarding these numbers.

=== Ethiopia and Somalia ===
Other forms of anti-Italianism showed up in Ethiopia and Somalia in the late 1940s, as happened with the Somali nationalist rebellion against the Italian colonial administration that culminated in a violent confrontation in January 1948 (Eccidio di Mogadiscio). 54 Italians, mostly women and children, died in the ensuing political riots in Mogadishu and several coastal towns.

== In France ==
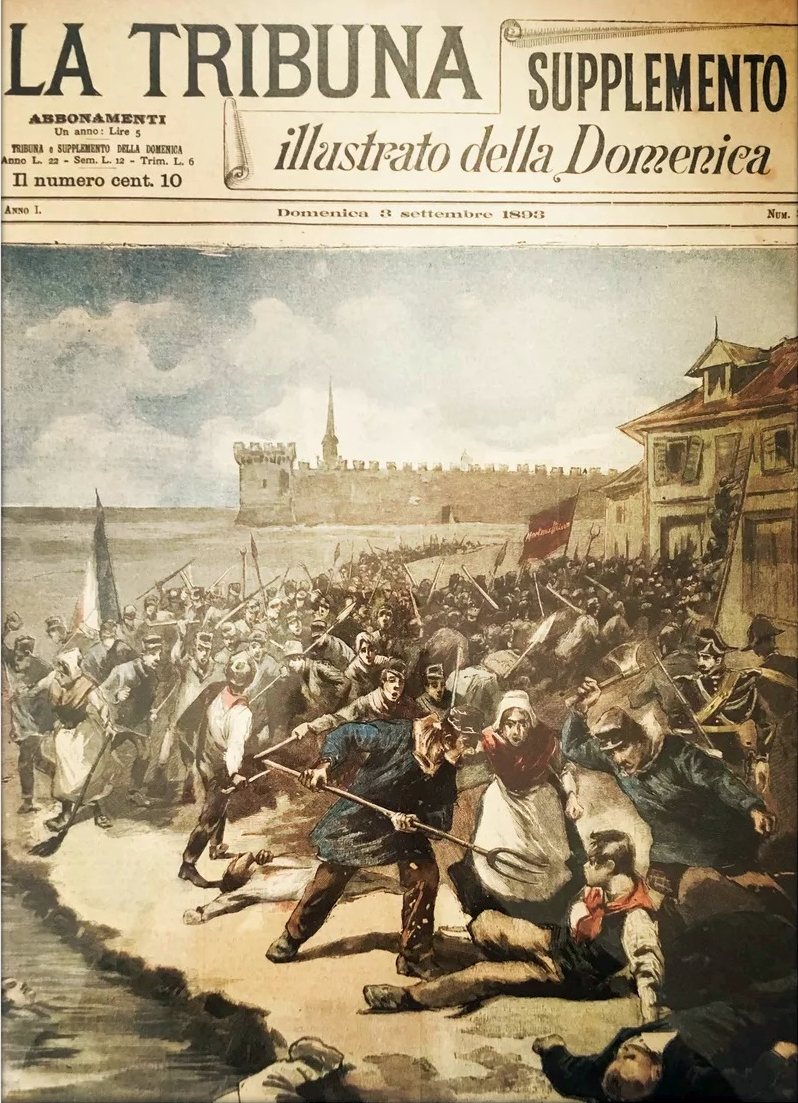
Massacre in France, 1893

The massacre of the Italians at Aigues-Mortes took place on 16 and 17 August 1893, in Aigues-Mortes, France, which resulted in the deaths of immigrant Italian workers of the Compagnie des Salins du Midi, at the hands of French villagers and labourers. Estimates range from the official number of eight deaths up to 150, according to the Italian press of the time. Those killed were victims of lynchings, beatings with clubs, drowning and rifle shot. There were also many non-fatal injuries.

The massacre was not the first attack by French workers on poor Italian immigrant labourers that were prepared to work at cut-rate wages. When the news reached Italy anti-French riots erupted in the country. The case was also one of the greatest legal scandals of the time, since no convictions were ever made.

== See also ==
Media related to Anti-Italianism at Wikimedia Commons

- Racism
- Compagnie Francaise de Navigation a Vapeur v. Louisiana Board of Health, a 1902 U.S. Supreme Court case that upheld state laws that prevented Italian immigrants from disembarking into quarantine zones
- Internment of Italian Americans in U.S. World War II
