= Guy of Ibelin =

Guy of Ibelin may refer to:

- Guy of Ibelin, constable of Cyprus (c. 1215–1255), marshal and constable of Cyprus, son of John of Ibelin, old Lord of Beirut
- Guy of Ibelin (died 1304), count of Jaffa, son of John of Jaffa, the jurist
- Guy of Ibelin (1286–1308)
- Guy of Ibelin, seneschal of Cyprus, (b. before 1306 d. 1350/1360), burgher of Venice
- Guy of Ibelin, bishop of Limassol, (died 1367)
