= Guy Weill =

American art collector (1914–2006)

- Born: May 13, 1914; Zürich, Switzerland
- Died: August 17, 2006 (aged 92); New York City, U.S.
- Occupation: Art collector
- Spouse: Marie-Hélène Bigar
- Relatives: Kurt Weill (cousin)

Guy Weill (May 13, 1914 – August 17, 2006) was a Swiss-born American art collector. Born in Switzerland, he served in military intelligence for the United States Army during World War II and ran a luxury clothing store on Madison Avenue after the war. He was a large collector of Abstract Expressionism, Neo-Expressionism, and Asian Art.

== Early life ==
Guy Weill was born on May 13, 1914 in Zürich, Switzerland. His mother was Alsatian. He had a sister, Marianne Lester. His cousin, Kurt Weill, was a renowned composer.

Weill emigrated to the United States in 1938. During World War II, he worked in military intelligence for the United States Army.

== Career ==
Weill ran a clothing store on Madison Avenue in New York City called British American House. He imported luxury clothes from England, like Aquascutum and Burberry, and sold them in his store.

== Art collection ==
Weill began collecting paintings by Pablo Picasso and Ernst Ludwig Kirchner as a teenager in Switzerland. Once in New York after World War II, he and his wife focused on collecting works of Abstract Expressionism and Neo-Expressionism. For example, they acquired paintings by Sam Francis, Philip Guston, Robert Motherwell, Larry Rivers, Karel Appel, Helen Frankenthaler and Louise Nevelson.

From the late 1970s onward, Weill and his wife began collecting Asian art. In 1979, they began an annual trip on the Silk Road of China to find more art to purchase.

In 2002, the Weills's art collection was the subject of an exhibition at the Metropolitan Museum of Art called Cultivated Landscapes: Reflections of Nature in Chinese Painting with Selections from the Collection of Marie-Hélène and Guy Weill. A catalogue was subsequently published.

== Personal life and death ==
Weill had a wife, Marie-Hélène Bigar, and three daughters, Photographer Kathryn, Film and TV Director Claudia and Patricia. They resided in New York City and summered in Cape Cod. He died on August 17, 2006, at the age of 92.
