= Guy III =

Guy III may refer to:

- Guy III of Châtillon (1254–1317)
- Guy III of Spoleto (died 894)
- Guy III, Count of Saint-Pol (died 1289)

== Other ==
- Guy III (album), from American R&B group Guy
