= Guy II =

Guy II may refer to:

- Guy II de Balliol (died early 1160s)
- Guy II, Count of Blois (died 1397)
- Guy II of Gibelet, of the Embriaco family
- Guy II, Marquis of Namur (1312–1336)
- Guy II, Count of Ponthieu (c. 1120–1147)
- Guy II de la Roche (1280–1308)
- Guy II de Nesle (died 1352), Lord of Mello
- Guy II de Pontailler (died 1392)
- Guy II of Spoleto (died 882 or 883)
