= Guy Ben-Ari =

American arts operations leader

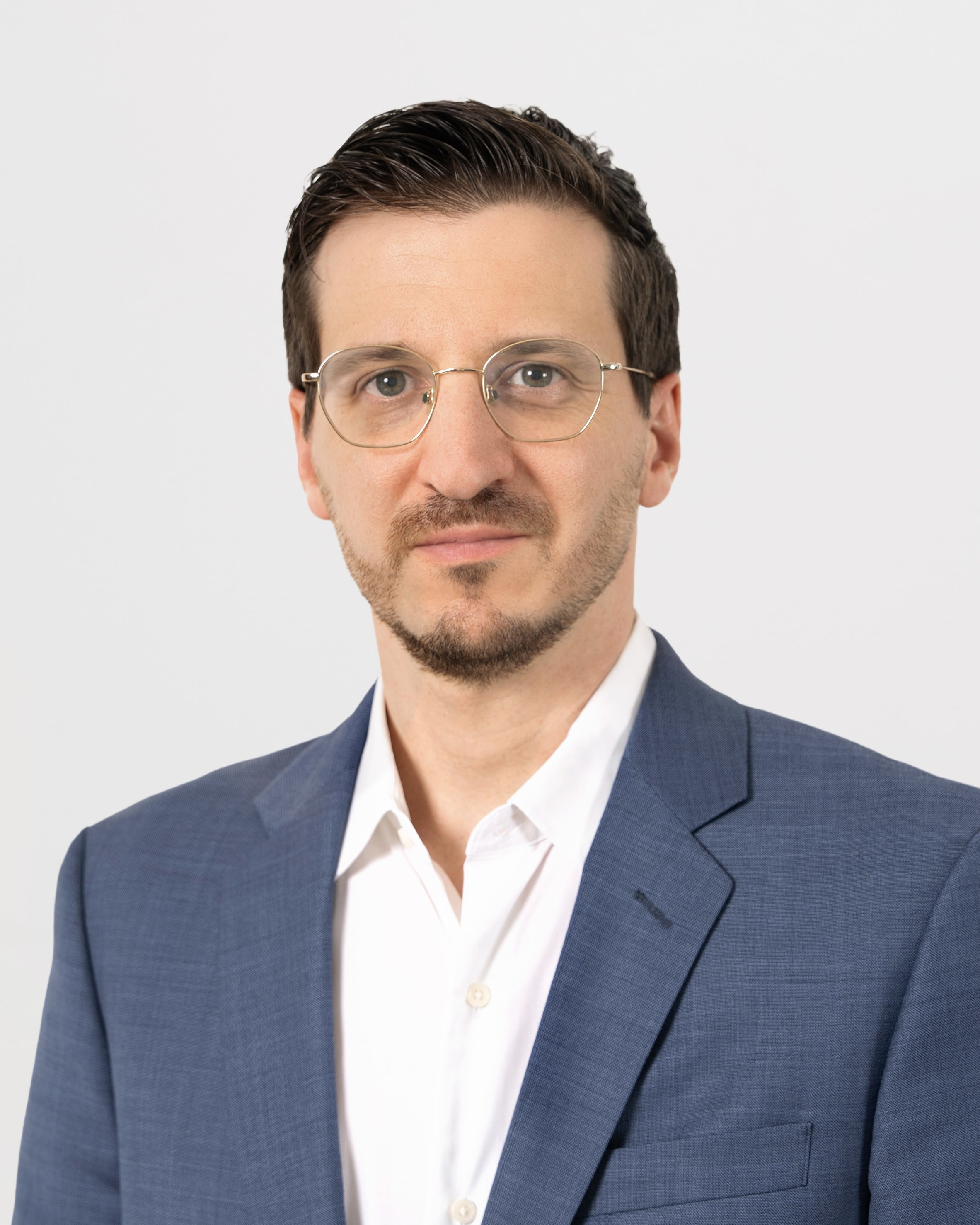
- Photograph of Guy Ben-Ari, an American arts operations executive, taken in 2023.
- Born: Tel Aviv, Israel
- Education: Columbia University, Bezalel Academy of Art and Design

Guy Ben-Ari (born in Tel Aviv, Israel) is an American arts operations executive based in New York City. He is known for his leadership in business operations, strategic planning, and capital project management at major cultural institutions. He currently serves as Senior Director of Operations at Pace Gallery.

== Biography ==
=== Career ===
Guy Ben-Ari is an American cultural institution executive based in New York City. He currently serves as Senior Director of Operations at Pace Gallery, where he helps lead core business functions and operational strategy across the gallery’s global locations.

Ben-Ari is the co-founder and executive director of Meta Meta Meta LLC, a Brooklyn-based cultural space operated on a not-for-profit basis, supporting multidisciplinary artists and inclusive community programming.

=== Artistic Practice ===
He earned his MFA from Columbia University’s School of the Arts in 2011 and a BFA with honors from the Bezalel Academy of Art and Design in Jerusalem in 2009, where he received the Presser Award for Excellence in Painting. In 2008, he participated in a merit-based exchange at the Slade School of Fine Art, University College London.

Ben-Ari was an artist-in-residence at the Lower Manhattan Cultural Council Workspace Residency, the NARS Foundation, Triangle Arts Association, and the Lower East Side Printshop. He was a recipient of the SIP Award from the Robert Blackburn Printmaking Workshop at The Elizabeth Foundation for the Arts. His work has been supported by institutions such as the America-Israel Cultural Foundation and the Lower Manhattan Cultural Council, and is included in the collection of the Metropolitan Museum of Art.
