= Guido Di Fonzo =

Argentine professional footballer

Personal information
- Full name: Guido Sebastián Di Fonzo
- Date of birth: 13 June 1996 (age 30)
- Place of birth: Argentina
- Position: Defender

Team information
- Current team: Deportivo Español

Senior career*
Years	Team	Apps	(Gls)
2018–	Deportivo Español	3	(0)
- * Club domestic league appearances and goals as of 20:37, 22 May 2019 (UTC)

Guido Sebastián Di Fonzo (born 13 June 1996) is an Argentine professional footballer who plays as a defender for Deportivo Español.

== Career ==
Di Fonzo started his career in Primera B Metropolitana with Deportivo Español. He made his professional debut on 2 May 2018 during a goalless draw with Comunicaciones, which was his only appearance of the 2017–18 season. Di Fonzo returned to their first-team set-up in the succeeding October, appearing for the full duration of fixtures with All Boys and Fénix. Three months later, he was demoted back into the reserves.

== Career statistics ==
As of 22 May 2019.

Appearances and goals by club, season and competition
Club	Season	League			Cup		League Cup		Continental		Other		Total	
Club	Season	Division	Apps	Goals	Apps	Goals	Apps	Goals	Apps	Goals	Apps	Goals	Apps	Goals
Deportivo Español	2017–18	Primera B Metropolitana	1	0	0	0	—		—		0	0	1	0
Deportivo Español	2018–19	Primera B Metropolitana	2	0	0	0	—		—		0	0	2	0
Career total			3	0	0	0	—		—		0	0	3	0
