= Disappearance of Guy Hever =

Israeli military person missing in action

Guy Hever
- גיא חבר
- Born: 30 May 1977 (age 49); Nahariya, Israel
- Military career
- Allegiance: Israel
- Branch: Israeli Army
- Disappeared: 17 August 1997 (aged 20); Golan Heights
- Status: Missing for 29 years, 2 months and 13 days

Guy Hever (Hebrew: גיא חבר; born 30 May 1977) is an Israeli MIA. Hever, a soldier in the Israeli Army, has been missing since 17 August 1997. He was last seen on his army base at 9:30 AM on the Golan Heights, dressed in his army fatigues, carrying his weapon, a Galil AR, his dog tag and his international military identification papers (Geneva Convention Card). The area was searched thoroughly, but to this day his whereabouts are unknown.

== Biography ==
Guy Hever was born in Nahariya, Israel to Rina and Eitan Hever.

== Disappearance ==
Hever had previously been sentenced to 21 days confinement for falling asleep during guard duty. On Saturday night, Hever was tasked with placing stickers on crates of supplies, an order he refused to carry out, and accordingly received a court martial summoning for insubordination. On Sunday morning, he finished his guard duty at 9:15 AM and was last seen at 9:30 AM buying a can of Coca-Cola, still in his uniform and with rifle in hand, then leaving the base without permission. He was never seen again after this.

The original IDF investigation surmised that he had gone AWOL and had subsequently committed suicide, citing his upcoming courtmartial and a history of previous clashes with commanding officers. Both the military and the police searched for him, including with divers, dogs, robots and aircraft, but no trace of his body or weapon was ever found. They refused to classify Hever as a missing soldier for three years. His mother however was convinced from the beginning that her son was kidnapped by Syrian forces, although the Syrian government consistently ignored overtures from former US president Jimmy Carter, former Israeli and Syrian US ambassador Edward Djerejian and agents from the German Federal Intelligence Service.

On the day of his disappearance, a birdwatcher reported seeing a figure in military fatigues on the border, although this report is considered unreliable. Several months later, a woman living near the army base said that she saw someone matching his description walking towards the Syrian border, and a German woman wrote to Hever's mother in 2005 claiming to have seen Hever being interrogated in Damascus. She had previously alerted the IDF of this, but had been ignored.

On 13 February 2007, a Syrian organization calling itself "The Resistance Committees for the Release of the Golan Heights" claimed to be holding Hever. The credibility of the statement is in doubt, since it came ten years after Hever's disappearance. Army officials said at the time that the IDF was investigating the claim, although it stated that this was not the first time that an organization claimed to have Hever in captivity.

In July 2009, Rina Hever said that she met with Israel's Prime Minister Benjamin Netanyahu. The premier pledged that a special point-man would be named to oversee the activity undertaken by the various defense agencies in the state in finding her missing son.

In August 2009, Rina Hever also met with Israel's Foreign Ministry director general Yossi Gal. The mother, who in the past sought the ministry's aid in finding her son yet was only accorded limited cooperation, requested that the government seriously broach the matter with the Syrians via an intermediary.

In the end of July 2009, Israel launched a quiet diplomatic campaign in an attempt to ascertain the whereabouts of Hever. Israel passed a message along to Syria via Russian Foreign Minister Sergei Lavrov in which Jerusalem communicated its desire to obtain any information that Syria may possess on Hever. While it is not clear if the soldier is in Syria, the move represents a significant change in Israel's official policy in the case. The goal of the campaign is to determine whether Syria can provide information on Hever's fate.

In 2011, the IDF appointed a high-ranking officer to liaise between Hever's family and the security services.

In 2014, the IDF resumed the search for Hever, torching two minefields near the base in order to see if any of the explosions were unusual, although no discovery was made.

In 2015, the IDF searched reservoirs in case Hever had drowned, but again to no avail.

In 2016, the IDF made another search, this time on land, but found no trace of Hever. The army also followed up on a lead from a psychic medium, and found human remains and clothes of a different individual in the Golan.

In 2017, the IDF raided a home for the mentally ill in the southern city of Rahat following a report than Hever was being kept there, but subsequently determined he was not there.

== Interest in the case ==
The Hever case has received significantly more attention that other missing person cases, including missing soldiers, and his name is often incorporated into the mission statements of NGOs focused on missing soldiers. According to anthropologist Dr. Danny Kaplan this is due to a number of factors: his role as a combat soldier, the social status of his family, and officials entertaining the possibility of Hever crossing over to Syria that has made it easier to add Hever to the more "valued" group of soldiers that are missing behind enemy lines.

== See also ==
- List of people who disappeared mysteriously: post-1970
