= Guy I =

Guy I may refer to:

- Guy I of Albon (c. 1000–1070)
- Guy I of Clermont (c. 1255 – 1302), Marshal of France, Seigneur (Lord) of Offemont
- Guy I, Count of Blois (died 1342)
- Guy I of Gibelet, of the Embriaco family
- Guy I of Luxembourg, Count of Ligny (1340–1371)
- Guy I of Montlhéry (died 1095)
- Guy I of Ponthieu (died 1100)
- Guy I de la Roche (1205–1263), Duke of Athens
- Guy I of Spoleto (died 860)

== Other ==
- Guy #1, a character in We Like Sportz by The Lonely Island
