= Guy Arvely Dolsin =

Malagasy politician

Guy Arvely Dolsin (born January 15, 1957, in Toamasina) is a Malagasy politician. He is a member of the Senate of Madagascar for Boeny, and is a member of the Tiako I Madagasikara party.
