= Guy Whatley =

American organist (born 1975)

Guy Richard Whatley (born 1975) is an American organist and harpsichordist. He is a specialist in medieval keyboards, sixteenth and seventieth century European music, and nineteenth century German organ music. He is widely known as a continuo player, and as an accompanist. He has performed on historic organs all over Europe and the Americas, and has performed at prestigious venues all across the world. He has performed at such venues as the Arizona Bach Festival, the Connecticut Early Music Festival, and the Costa Rica International Festival of Music. He has performed the complete keyboard works of William Byrd, John Bull, Johann Sebastian Bach, George Frederik Handel, and the complete organ works of Franz Liszt, Olivier Messiaen, and Herbert Howells.

Guy Whatley was born in Aberystwyth, Wales. Guy Whatley was educated at The University of Bristol, the Staatliche Hochschule für Musik und Darstellende Kunst, Stuttgart where his teacher was Ludger Lohmann, and at Arizona State University. He has also studied with numerous private teachers including Maria Boxall, Jean Boyer, Marie-Claire Alain, and Christopher Stembridge. He holds the Doctorate of Musical Arts degree from Arizona State University.

His primary interest is Tudor organ music and his doctoral dissertation is "Toward a Performance Practice for Tudor Organ Music." He has also published a number of editions of music for trumpet and organ. In March 2021, he resigned his post as an Associate Editor for the journal Vox Humana after he submitted an article titled “Performing the Early Organ Works of Herbert Howells,” which was found to be plagiarized.

He has released three commercially available CD recordings with trumpeter Jean-Christophe Dobrzelewski including: Triptyque, Trumpets and Organs and Triptyque Renewal and Eternal Source of Light Divine. They have played all across Europe and the United States.
