= Guido Barreyro =

Argentine footballer

Personal information
- Full name: Guido Maximiliano Barreyro
- Date of birth: 21 June 1988 (age 38)
- Place of birth: Posadas, Argentina
- Height: 1.98 m (6 ft 6 in)
- Position: Forward

Team information
- Current team: Guaraní Antonio Franco

Youth career
- Racing Club

Senior career*
Years	Team	Apps	(Gls)
2006	Guaraní Antonio Franco		
2006–2007	Sparta Prague	0	(0)
2007–2008	Real Arroyo Seco	19	(4)
2008	Newell's Old Boys	0	(0)
2008	→ San Martín (loan)	0	(0)
2009	Guaraní Antonio Franco	15	(1)
2009–2010	RFK Novi Sad	12	(3)
2010–2011	FK Inđija	2	(1)
2011	→ FC Rosengård (loan)	21	(6)
2012	Guaraní Antonio Franco		
2012–2013	Cruz del Sur	1	(0)
2013	Defensores de Belgrano		
2014	Jorge Gibson		
2014–2015	Sol de América	7	(2)
2015–2016	Jorge Gibson	20	(8)
2017–2019	Atlético San Jorge	32	(22)
2018	→ Kristianstad (loan)	10	(0)
2019–	Guaraní Antonio Franco		
- * Club domestic league appearances and goals as of 1 November 2020

Guido Barreyro (born 21 June 1988) is an Argentine football striker playing with Guaraní Antonio Franco.

== Career ==
Born in Posadas, Misiones Department, Argentina, he played with Guaraní Antonio Franco in 2006. That summer he moved to the Czech Republic and joined AC Sparta Prague but played only for the reserves team. In 2007, he returned to Argentina and played with Real Arroyo Seco. In 2008, he joined Newell's Old Boys but spent his time there on loan at San Martín de Tucumán where, however, due to bureaucratic problems with Sparta, he was unable to make an official appearance. In 2009, he returned to his former club Guaraní, before returning to Europe in summer 2009 and joining Serbian First League side RFK Novi Sad. In following summer, Barreyro along his Novi Sad teammate Ecuatorian Augusto Batioja moved to FK Inđija who had just been promoted to the Serbian SuperLiga. During the winter break of the 2010–11 season he was loaned to Swedish side FC Rosengård where he played during 2011. In 2012, he returned to Argentina and after playing one year with Cruz del Sur de Bariloche, he joined in summer 2013 Defensores de Belgrano.

In January 2017, coming from Jorge Gibson, he signed with Atlético San Jorge from Santa Fe. With San Jorge he won the Copa de Santa Fe in March 2017. A year later, in January 2018, after a good season with San Jorge in Argentine Primera B Nacional, he moved on loan to Sweden to Kristianstad FC, a club San Jorge has a signed protocol with, along two other compatriots, Fernado Moreyra and Maximiliano Cabañas.

In summer 2019 he returned to Guaraní Antonio Franco.

== Sources ==
- Interview at FUTBOL PERDIDO EN EL MUNDO. (in Spanish)
