= Unico National =

Italian American service organization

UNICO National is a service organization of Italian Americans established in Waterbury, Connecticut, in 1922 to "engage in charitable works, support higher education, and perform patriotic deeds". According to its website, it is the "largest Italian American service organization in the USA". At that time of its founding, the trial of anarchists Sacco and Vanzetti was in the news, and many stories fostered a belief that Italian Americans were loyal primarily to their homeland. UNICO was founded by Italians who were denied membership in the local Rotary Club because they were Italian and to show that Italian Americans were loyal to America first and held no allegiance to Italy except through cultural traditions.

Unico is the Italian word for "unique", chosen to represent the one-of-a-kind nature of the organization. The word has since become a backronym which stands for Unity, Neighborliness, Integrity, Charity, Opportunity.

== Membership and activities ==
Membership is open to American citizens of Italian heritage or persons married to American citizens of Italian heritage. The local chapters perform community service activities and fund local scholarships as well as other charitable, educational, cultural and civic programs.

== National charities and initiatives ==
In addition to local chapter initiatives, UNICO supports charitable, educational, cultural and civic programs on a national level through the UNICO Foundation. The UNICO Foundation awards scholarships, funds cancer research, supports mental health initiatives, has established Italian Studies chairs at a number of universities, contributes to Cooley's Anemia research, and supports a number of cultural and heritage efforts on a national basis.

== Organization ==
At an annual convention held each year during July or August in different cities across the country, the membership elects an executive board of officers to conduct the activities of the national organization. There is a national president, executive vice president, 1st and 2nd vice president, as well as a number of other national officers. The current national president, bringing UNICO into its 102nd year, is Anthony Bengivenga, from the Greater Westfield, NJ Chapter. The organization's national headquarters is in Fairfield Township, Essex County, New Jersey.

== Campaign against stereotyping ==
Former UNICO president Andre DiMino has taken a strong stand against negative stereotyping of Italian Americans in the media and entertainment industries. As of April 2010, he had made over 40 major media appearances in Unico's campaign against the MTV reality show Jersey Shore and other negative portrayals of Italian Americans. In January 2010, DiMino brought the Unico campaign against Jersey Shore to Seaside Heights, where the show was filmed, by conducting the "Summit on the Shore: Anti-Italianism — MTV's Jersey Shore and a Whole Lot More" with a panel of speakers who presented their views about bias towards Italian Americans.

After meeting with DiMino, officials of MTV's parent company Viacom said that Jersey Shore's second season would have fewer references to Italians, fewer shots of the Italian flag, and fewer uses of offensive terms, such as guido. A spokesperson for MTV said they had "made some adjustments", but added, "However, our role is to document the cast, and however they refer to themselves we don't interfere."

After viewing MTV video promos for the second season of Jersey Shore, DiMino stated that he was "... cautiously optimistic ..." about the reduced references to Italian Americans but warned that he would continue to be vigilant about any further negative stereotyping or denigration of Italian Americans.

DiMino also targeted the video game Mafia II for allegedly portraying Italians and Italian-Americans as gangsters, and accused Take-Two Interactive of "blatantly and unfairly discriminating and demeaning" the community. The company later responded in a statement that the game's subject matter was done in a responsible manner and with discretion. Take-Two CEO Strauss Zelnick also claimed that no one in the organization has actually seen or played the game.

== See also ==
- Anti-Italianism
- Controversies of Jersey Shore (TV series)
- Jersey Shore (TV series)
- Order Sons of Italy in America
