= Guy Bellamy =

English author (1935–2015)

Guy Bellamy (1935 – 2015) was an English author known for his humorous novels. He wrote 14 novels, starting with The Secret Lemonade Drinker in 1977. His last, The Secret Vodka Drinker, appeared in 2012.

Bellamy was born in Bristol in 1935, but grew up in Surrey. Upon leaving school, he joined the RAF for National Service. He worked as a journalist for local newspapers in the Surrey area before moving to Fleet Street, where he became one of the youngest sub-editors for the Daily Express at the age of 24. He then worked at The Sun, before leaving in 1977 to focus on writing novels. Bellamy died in 2015.
