= Jewellery chain =

Jewellery made links of, or imitating, precious metal and worn as an ornament

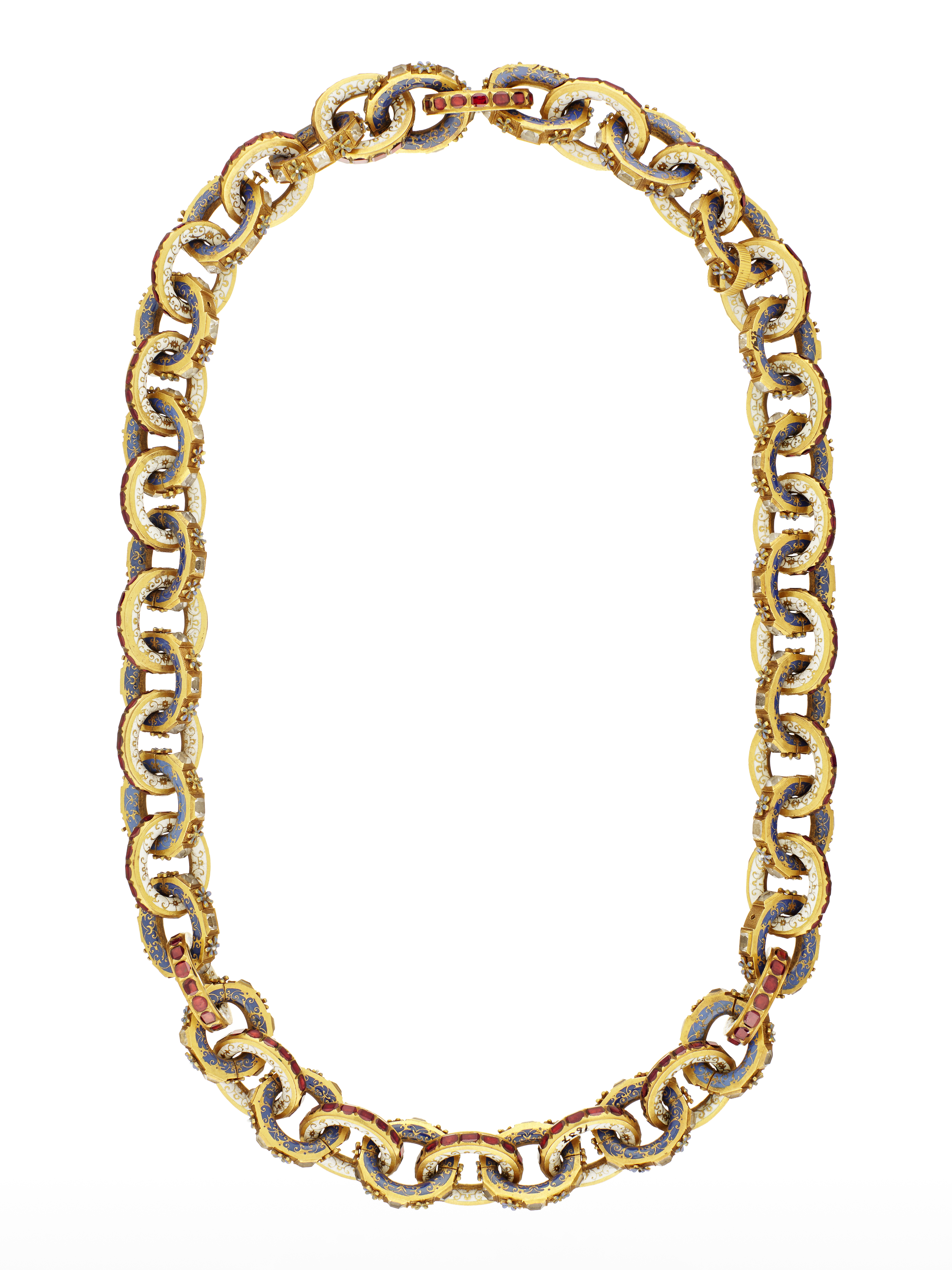
Solid 16th century gold chain with garnets, rock crystals and champlevé enamel, The Royal Armoury, Sweden. It may be a smaller version of Charles IX of Sweden's order chain for the Order of Jehovah, created in 1607, although another theory suggests that it was made by the goldsmith Ruprecht Miller and worn by Gustavus Adolphus at his declaration of authority in 1611.

Jewellery chains, jewelry chains or body chains are metal chains that are used in jewellery to encircle parts of the body, namely the neck, wrists and ankles, and they also serve as points to hang decorative charms and pendants.

== Material ==
Jewellery chains are typically made from precious metals, mainly gold and silver. Platinum, palladium and steel may also be used. These metals are used because they are not very reactive, keep both their intricate shape and their strength, and require only minimal maintenance to keep their shine. Small lever mechanisms called clasps serve as fastenings to enable the chain to be undone and redone.

== History ==
The earliest chain necklaces have been found in ancient Babylonia among jewellery dating back to 2500 BC. The tomb of Queen Puabi, who was buried in 2600 BC, included several gold chains that she wore in different ways. The old Greek, Roman and Egyptian civilisations followed later. An intricate 4th or 5th century Romano British gold body chain with an amethyst and four garnets, made for a slight woman or a girl, was found in the Hoxne Hoard in Suffolk. Around the Tudor period, heavy gold chains were both fashionable and statements of positions and power.

Wearing chains

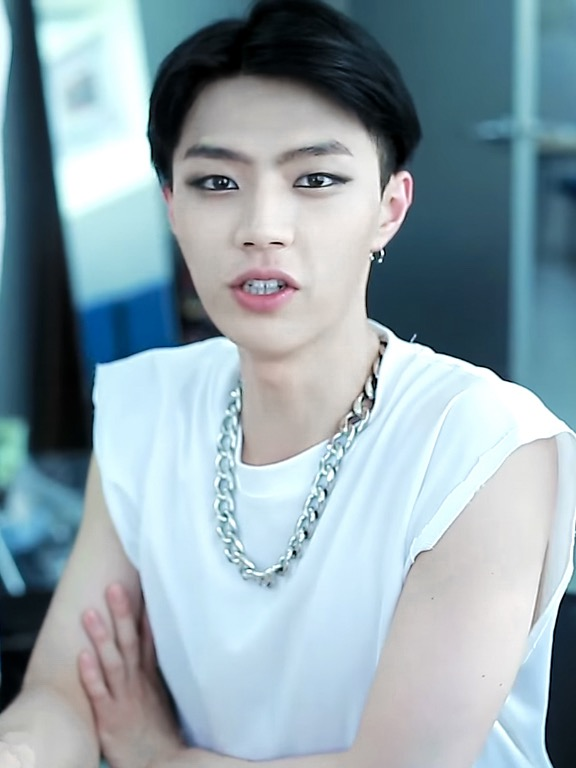
Necklaces

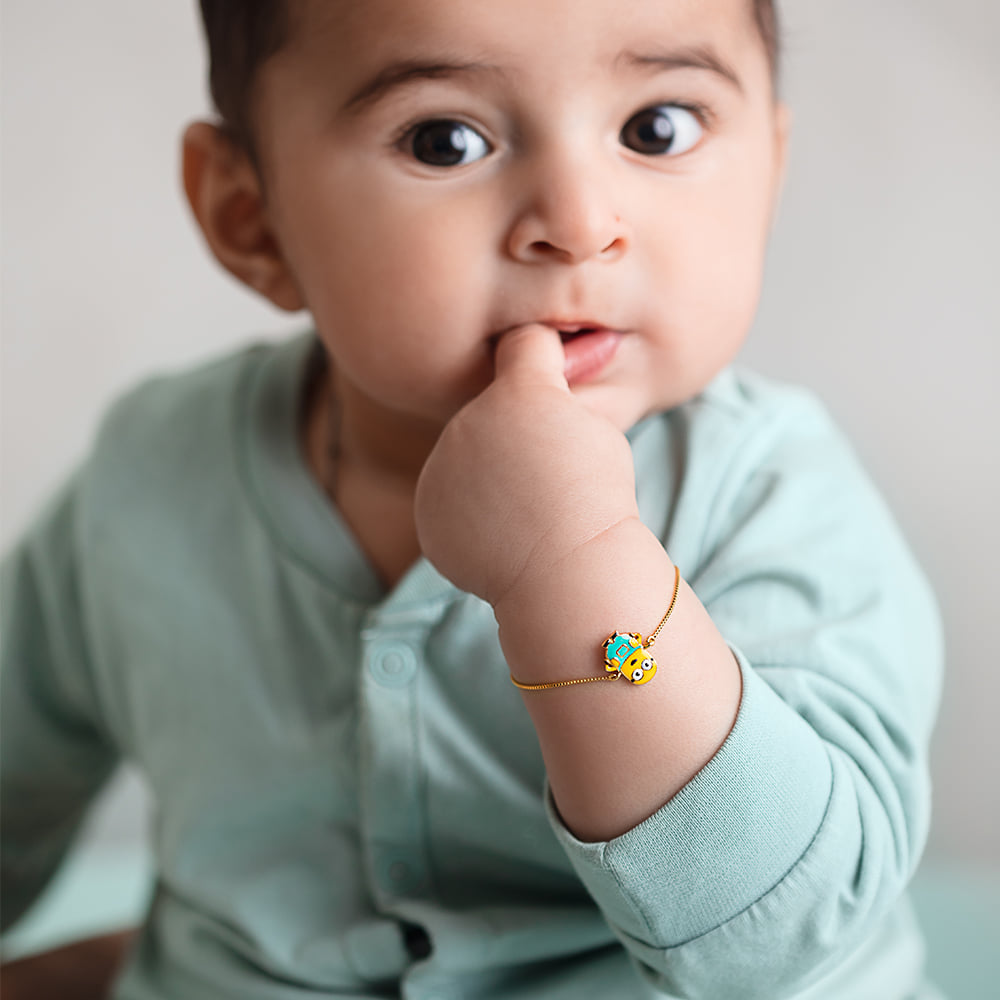
Bracelets

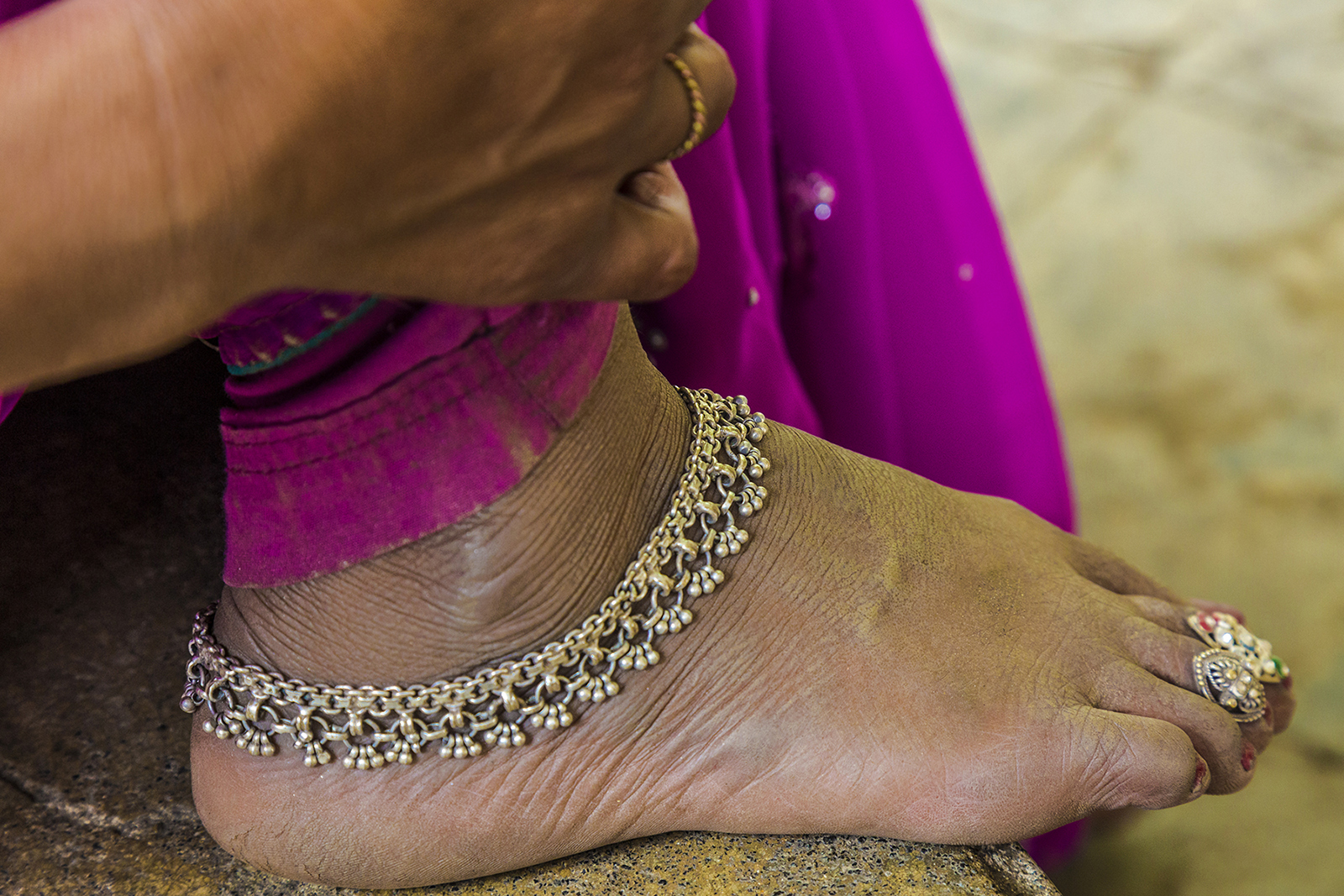
Anklets

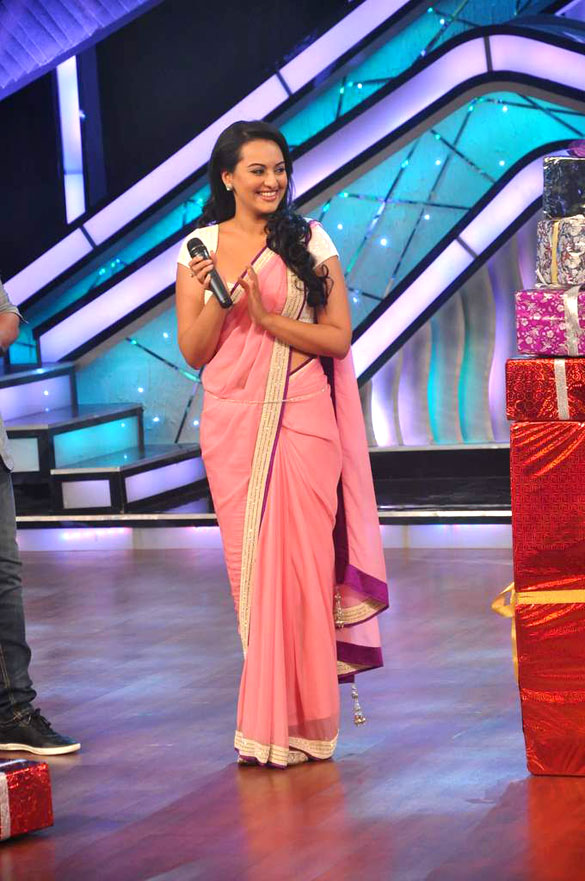
Belly chains

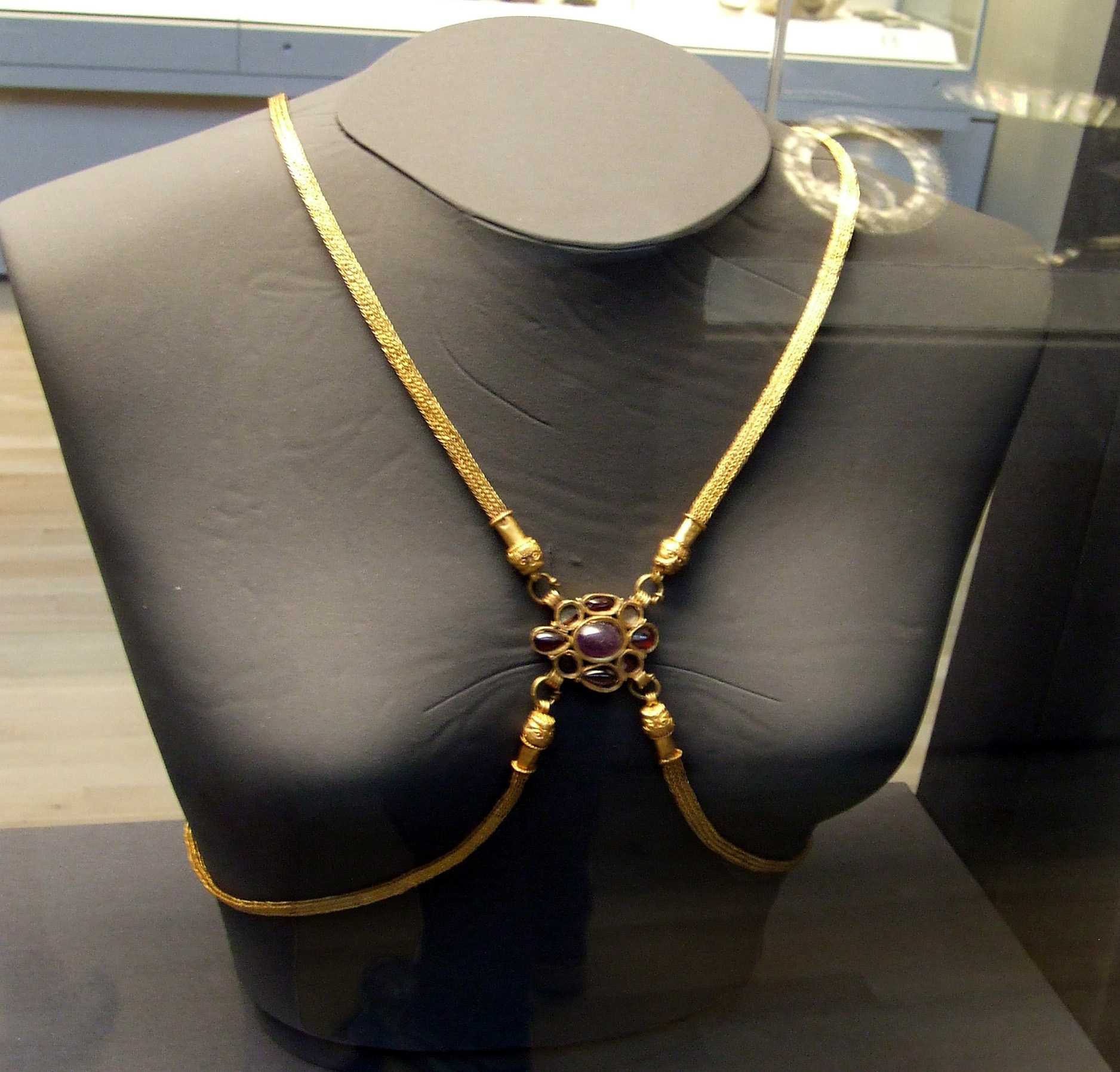
Body chains

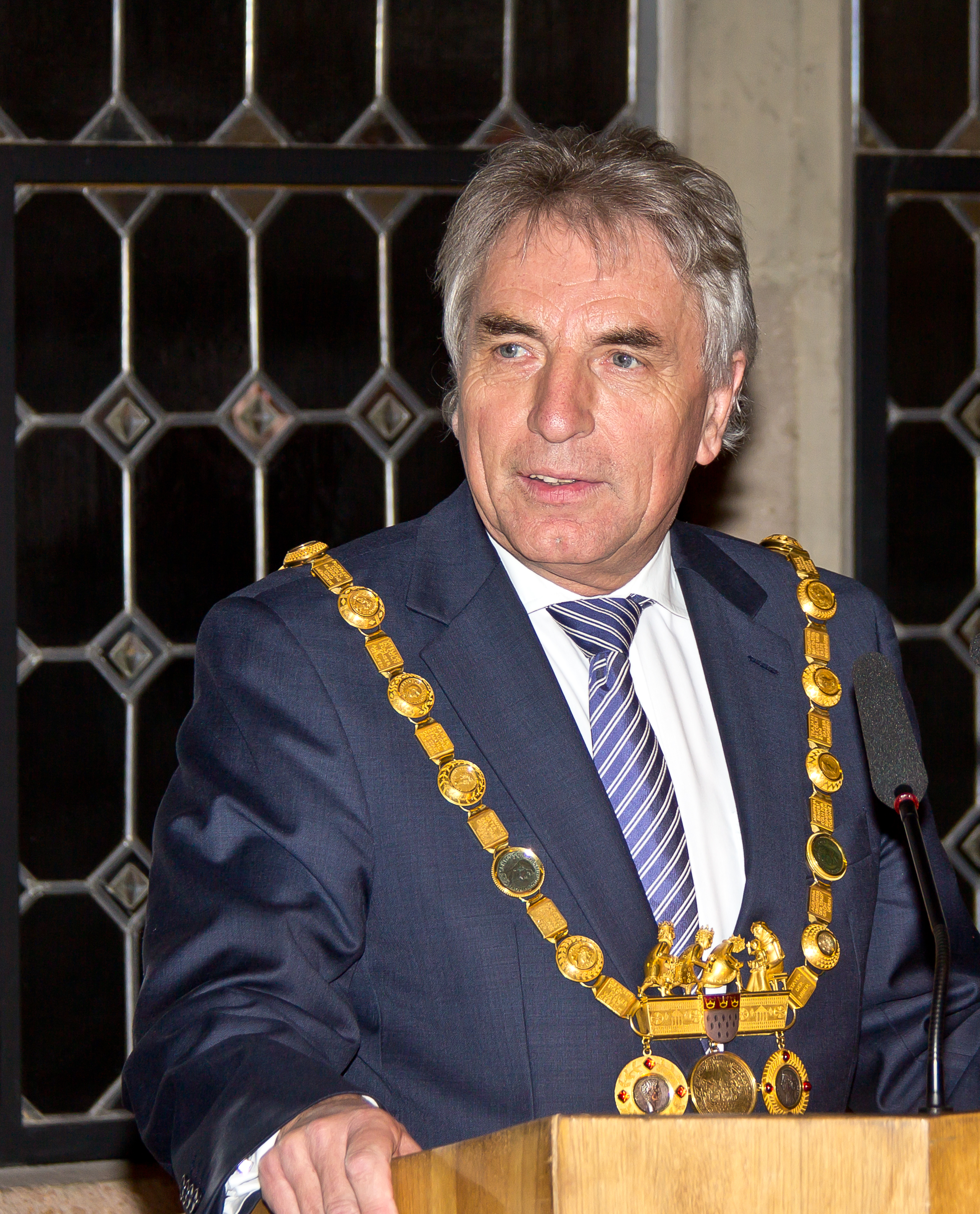
Chain of office

== Styles ==
There are a vast number of chain styles and techniques for making them. These are some of the more popular designs and their more common names. However, the names differ with countries depending on traditions.

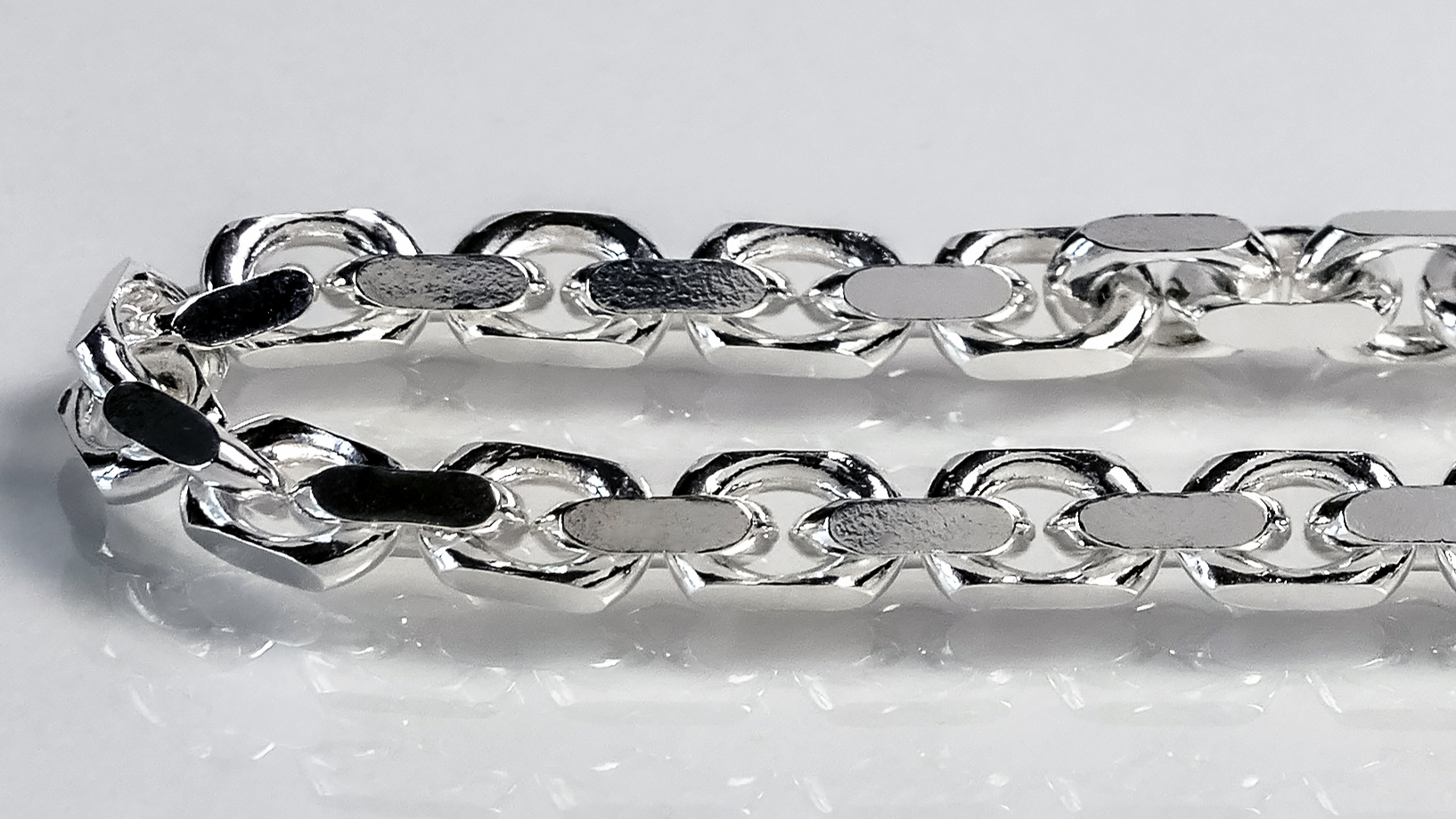
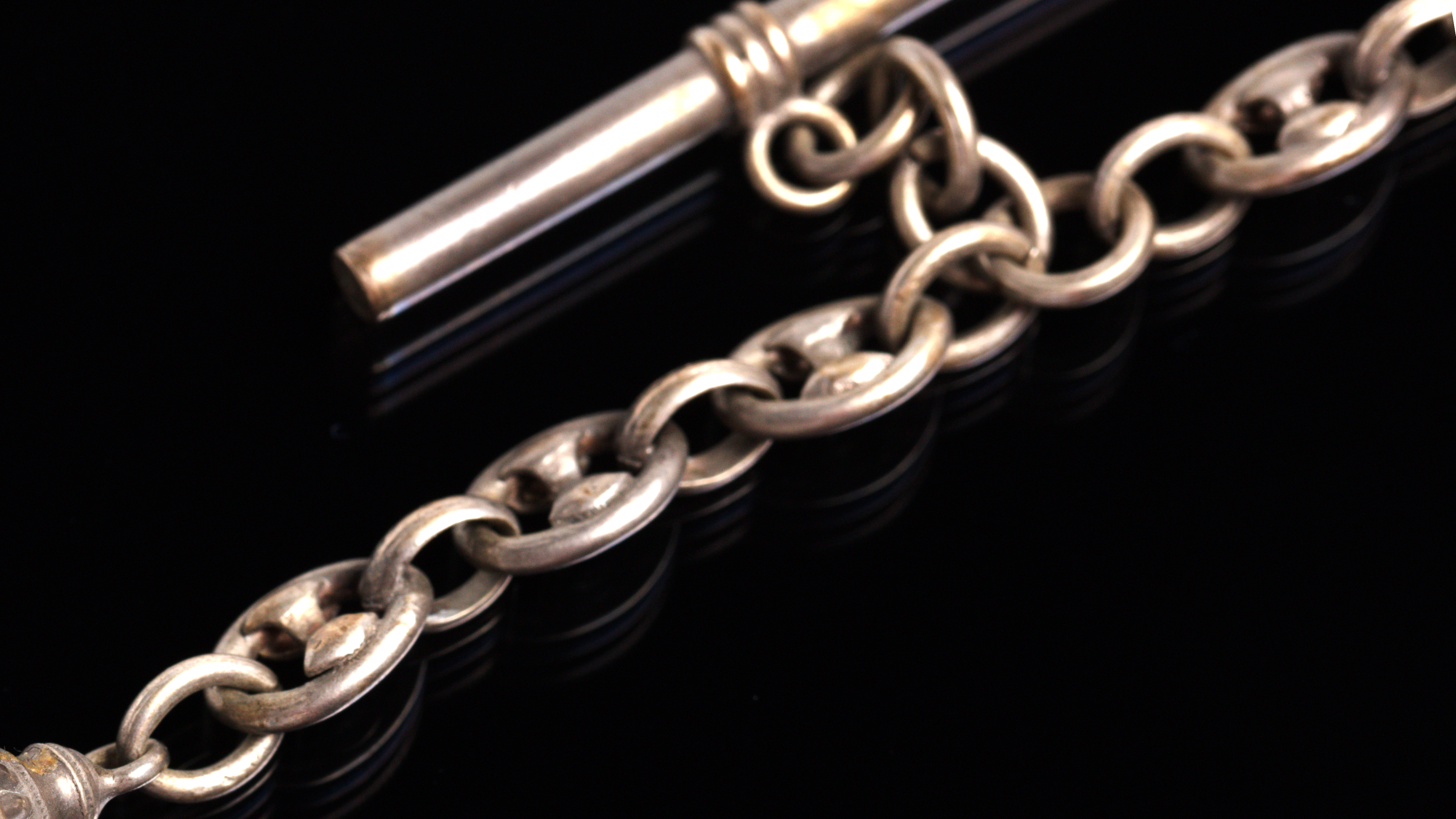
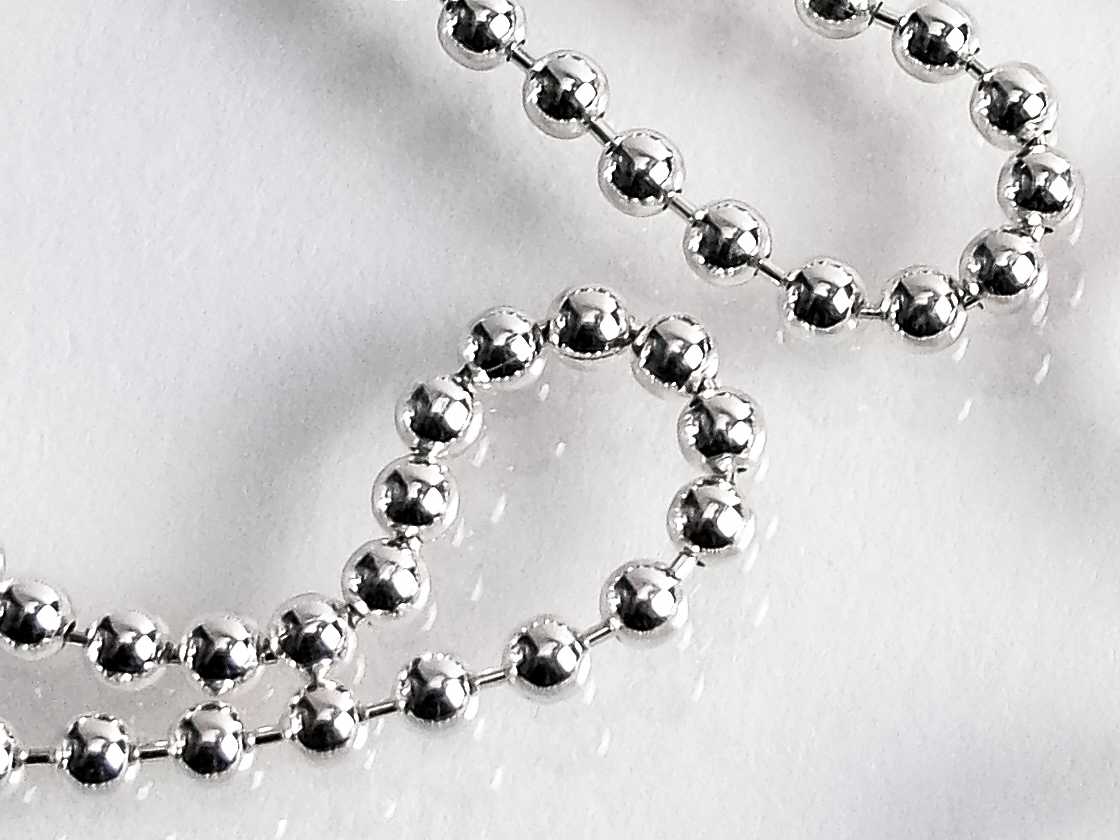
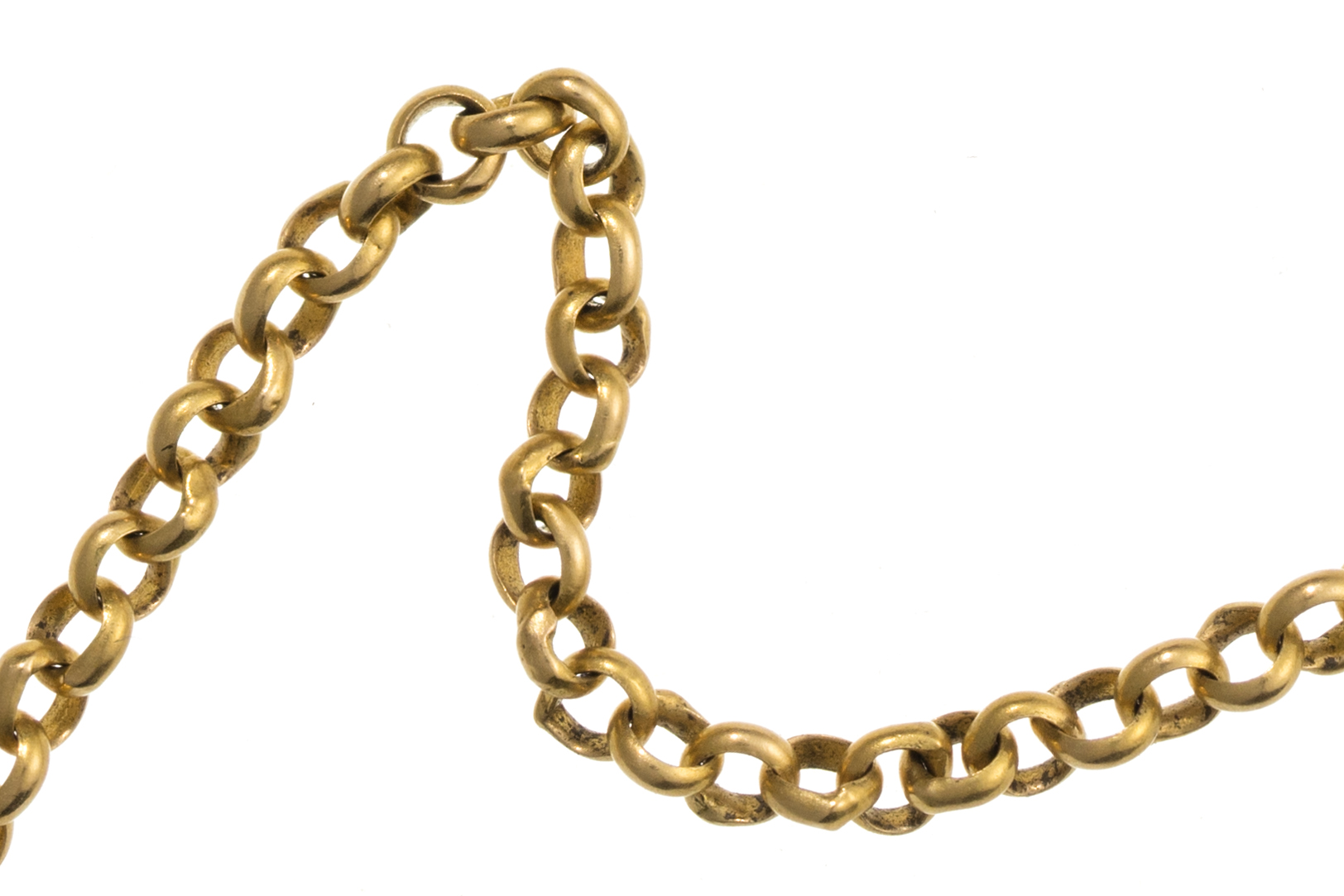
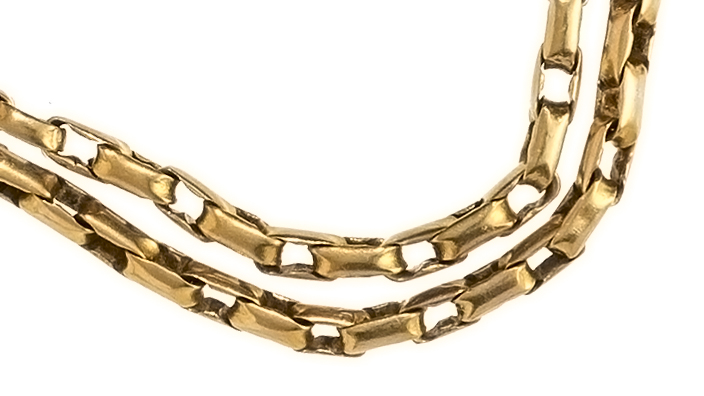
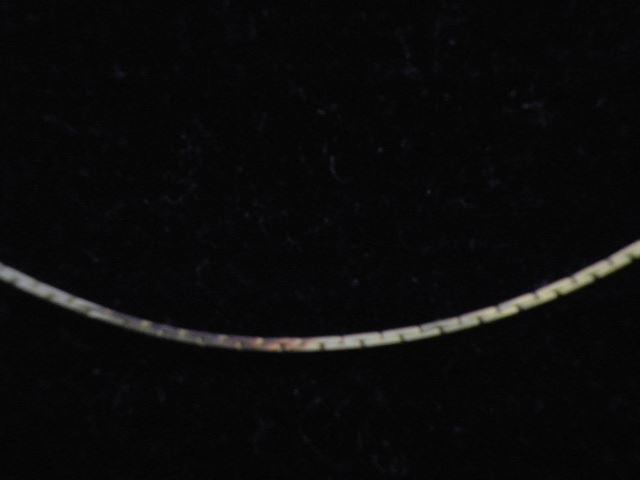
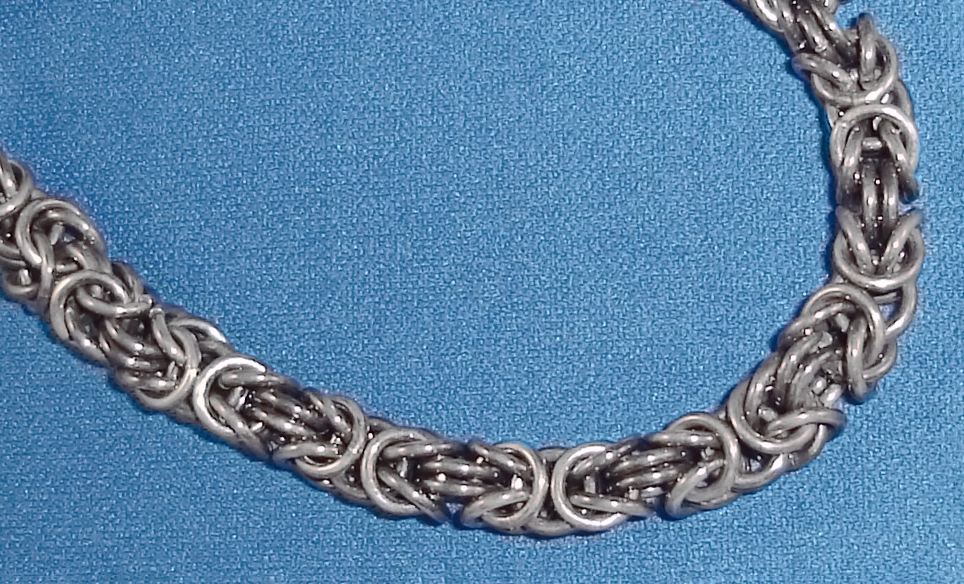
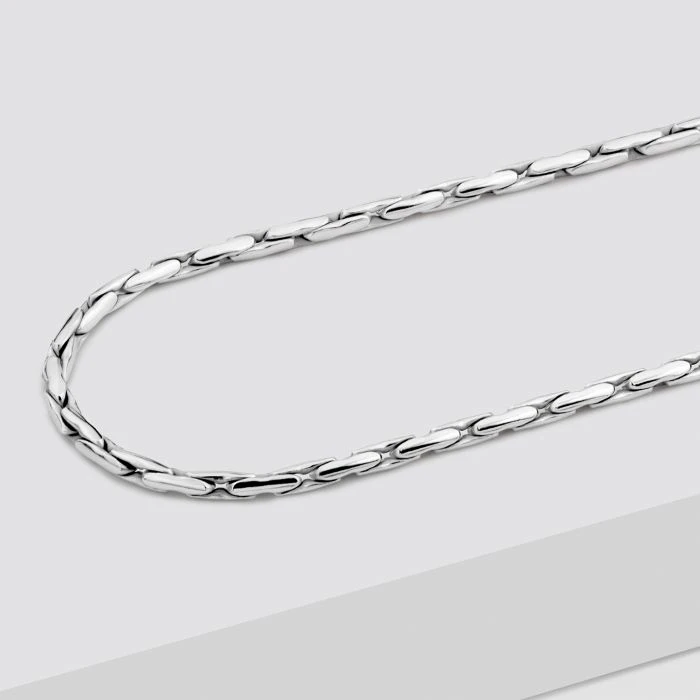
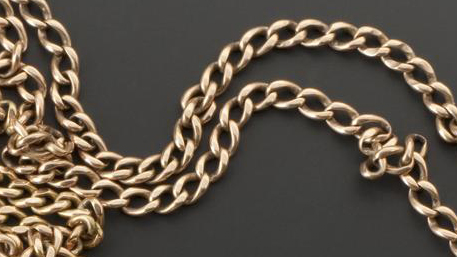
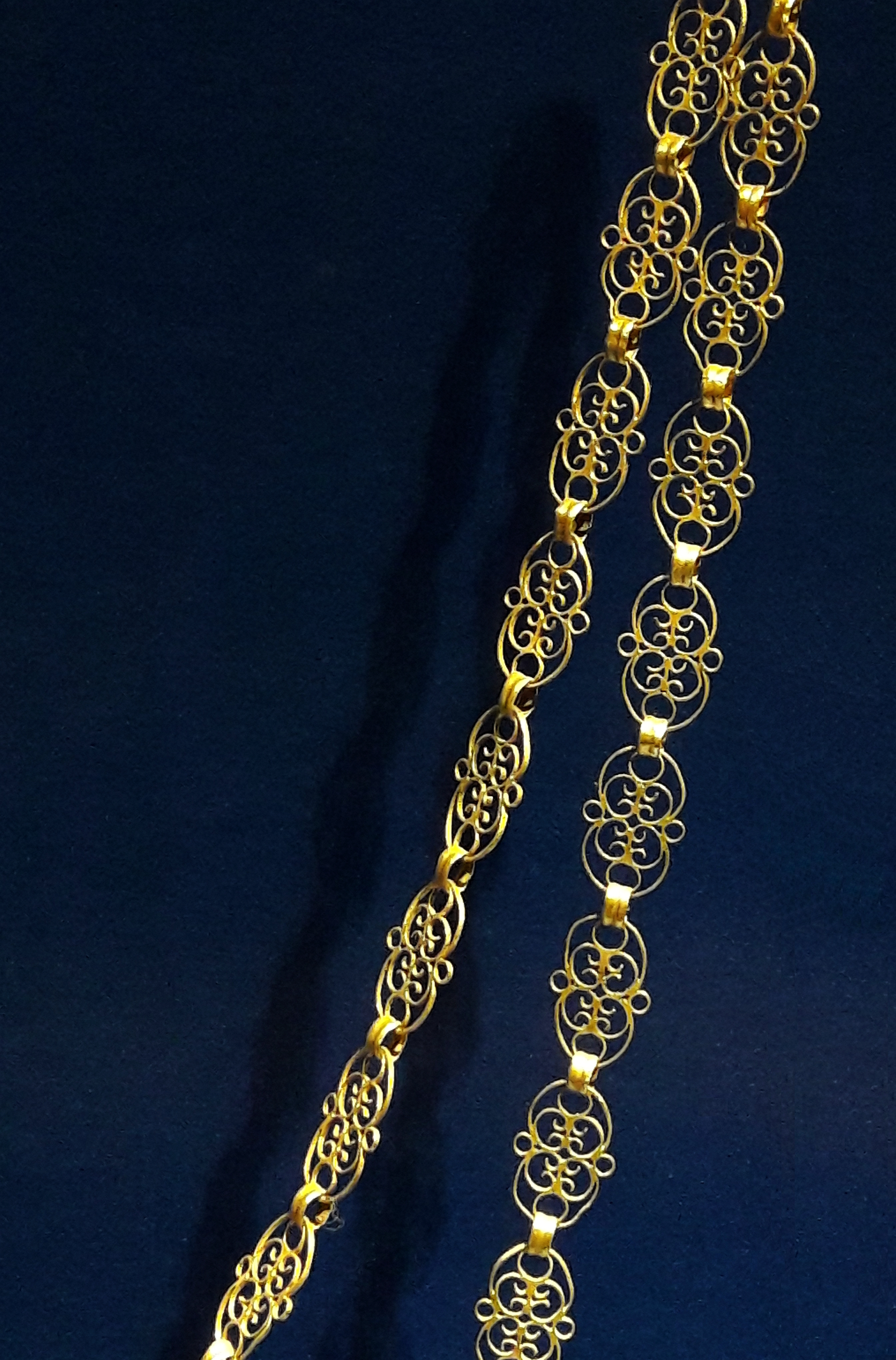
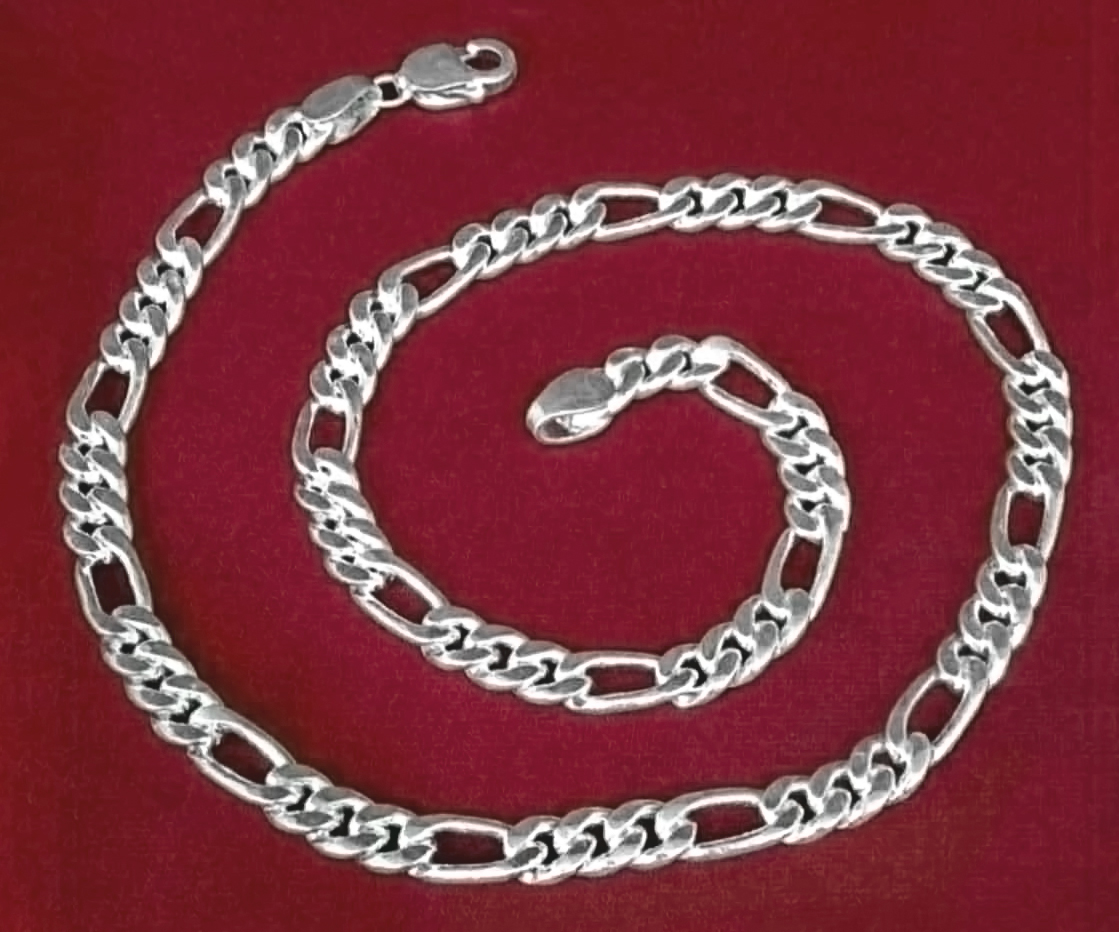
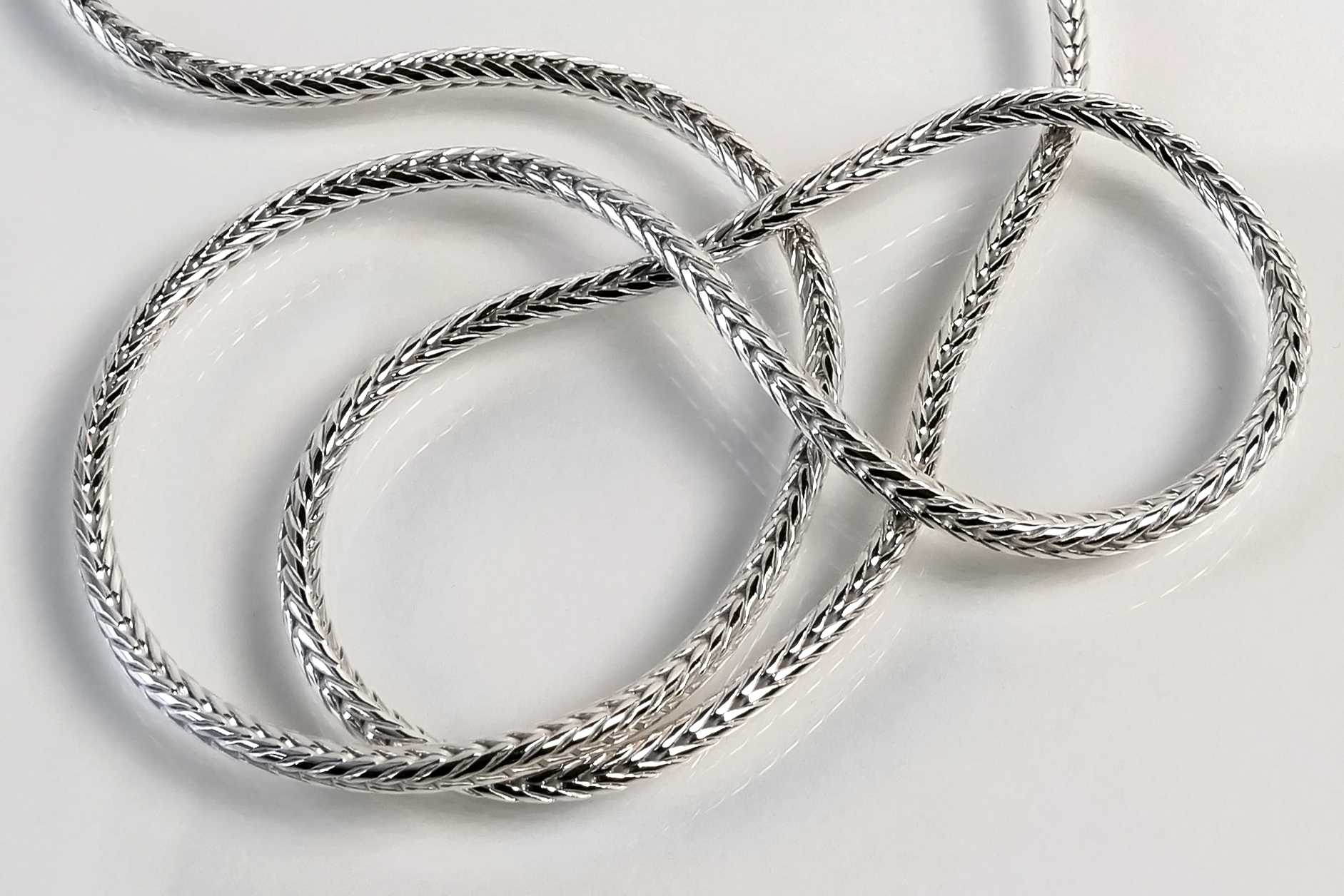
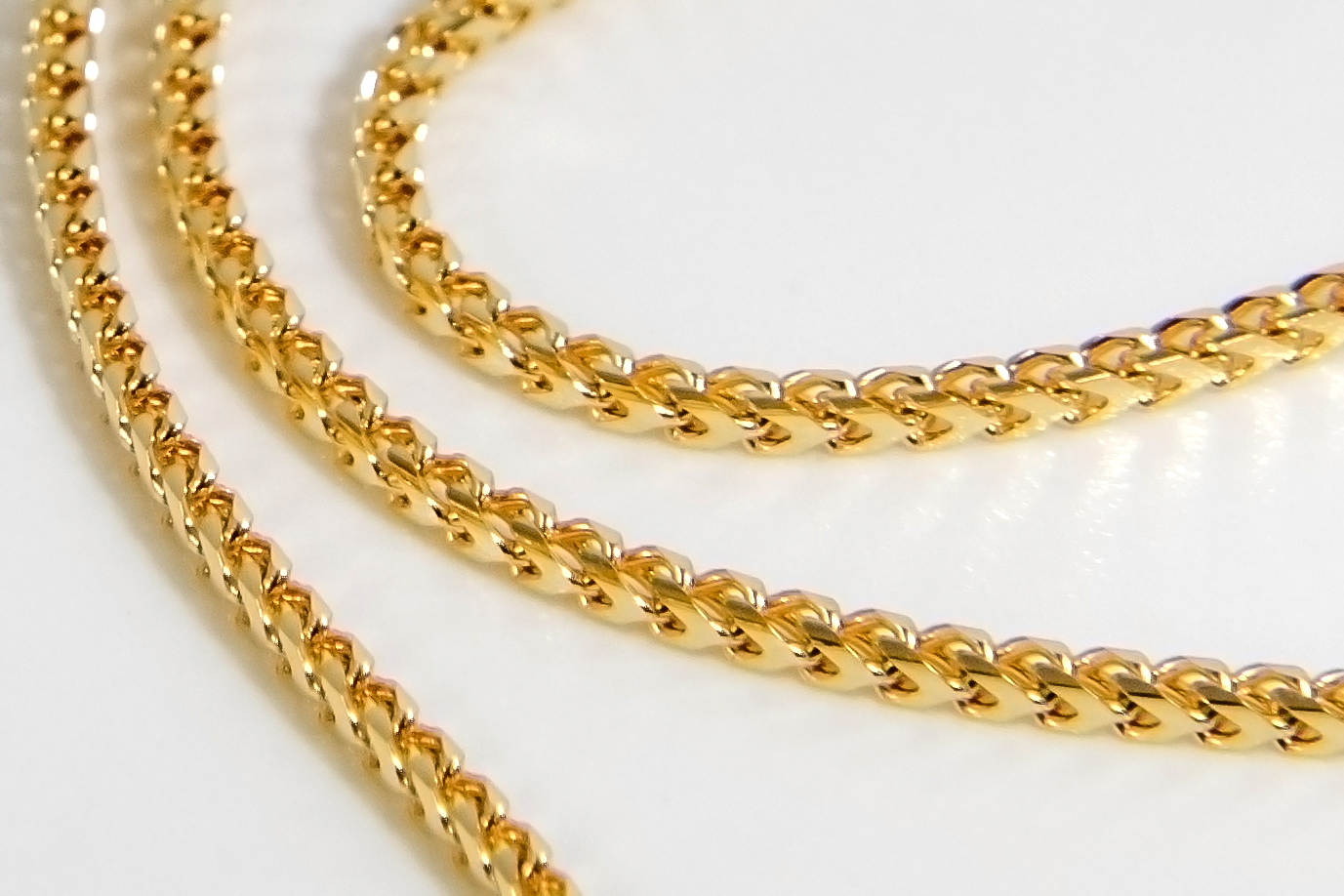
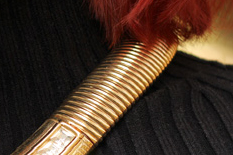
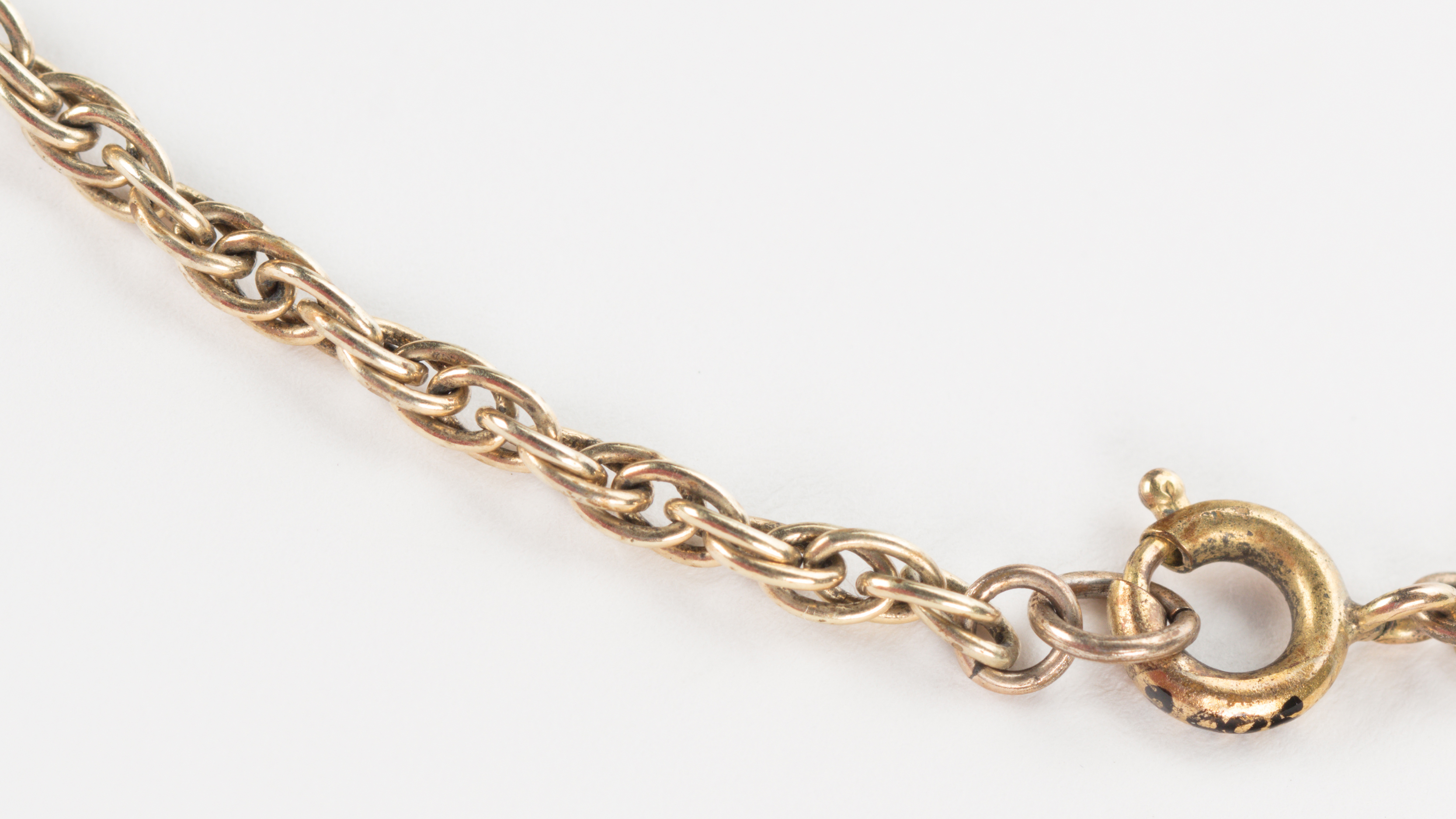
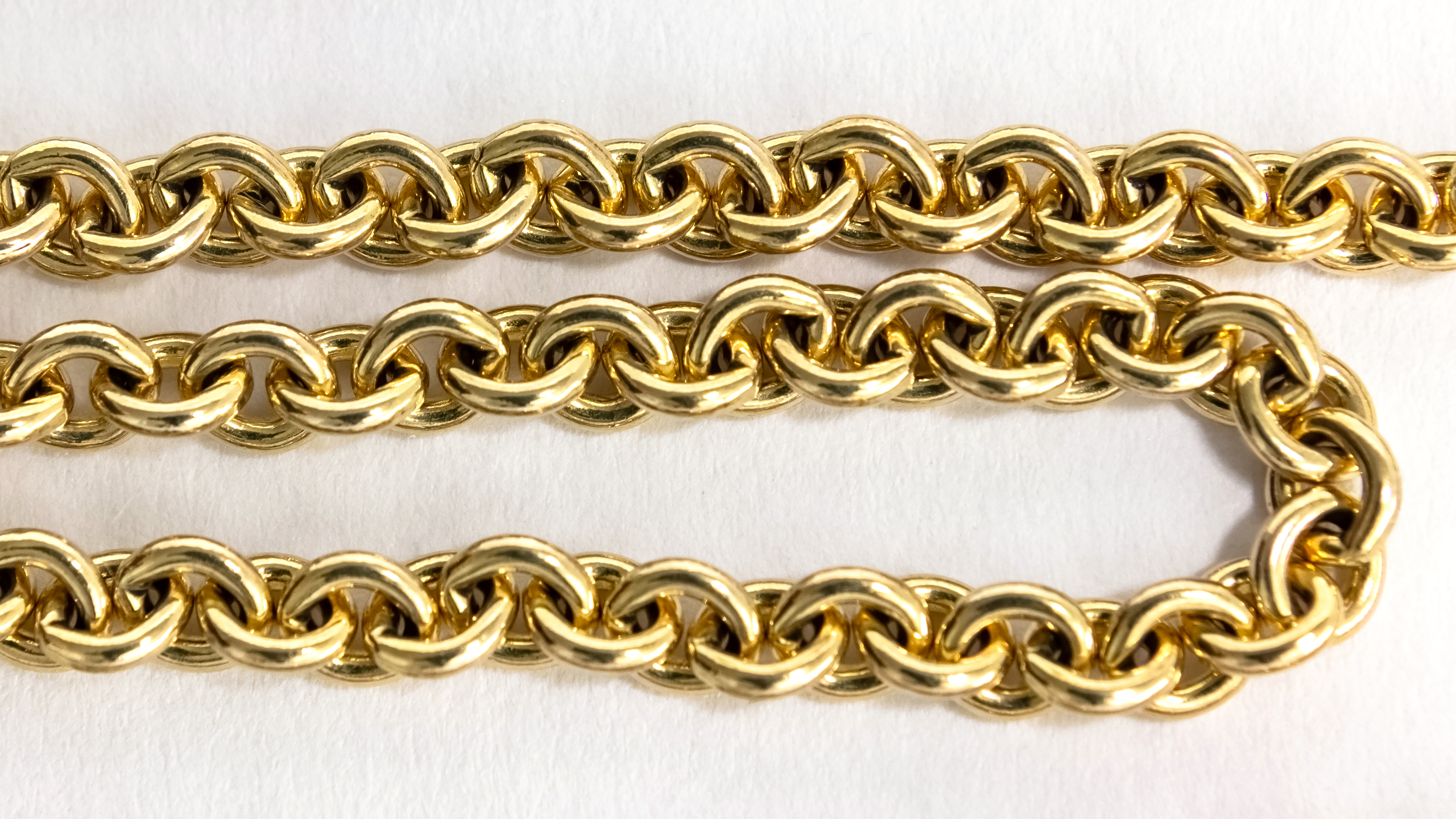
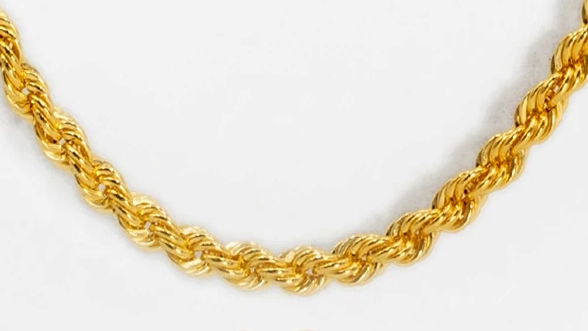
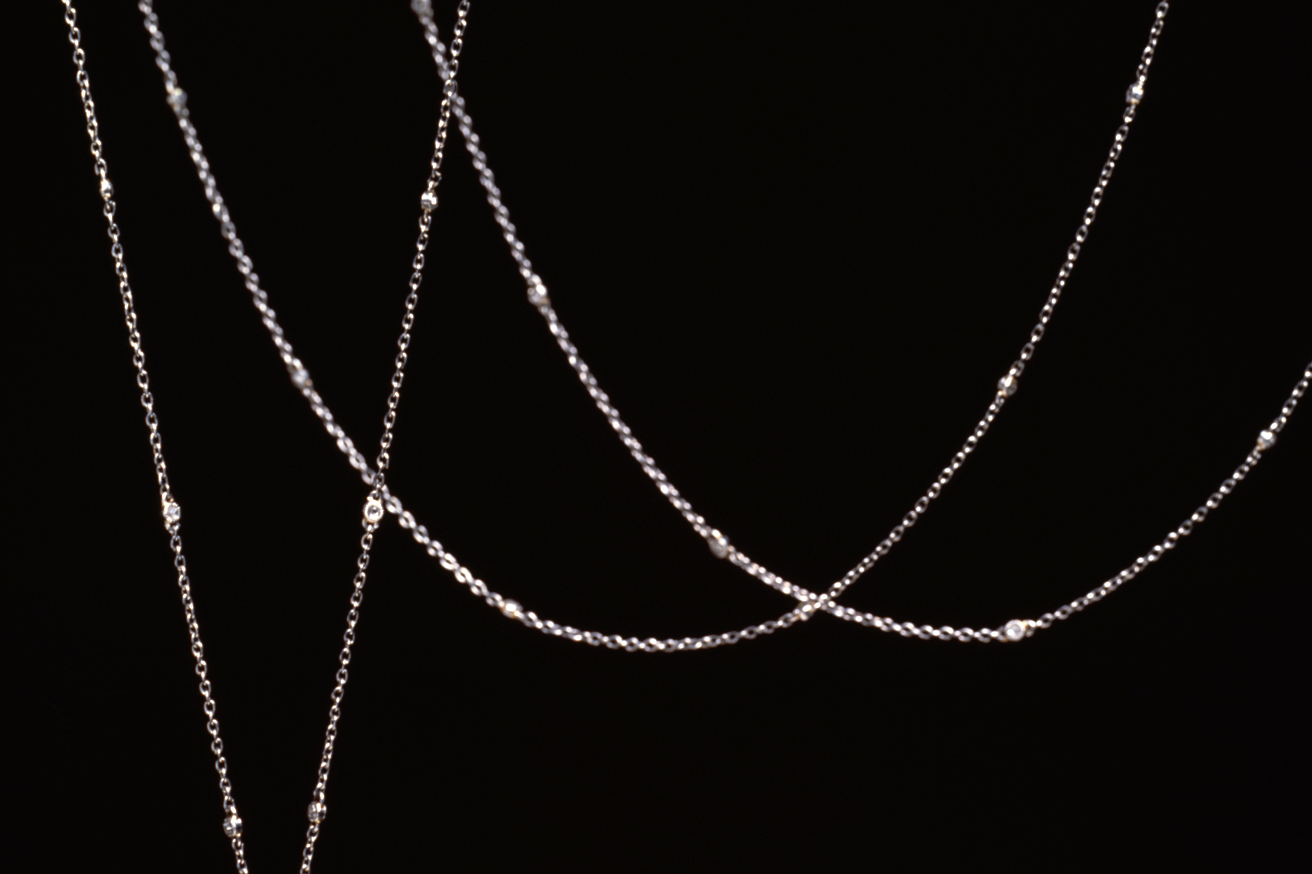
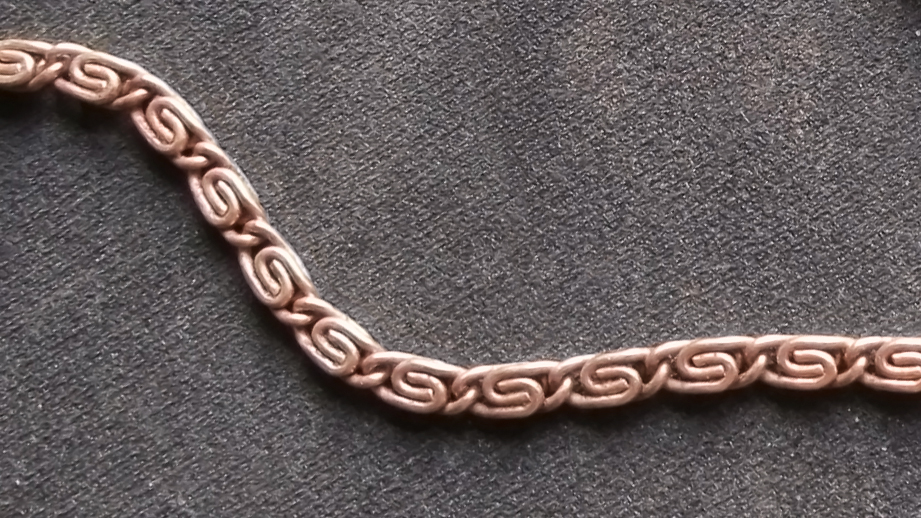
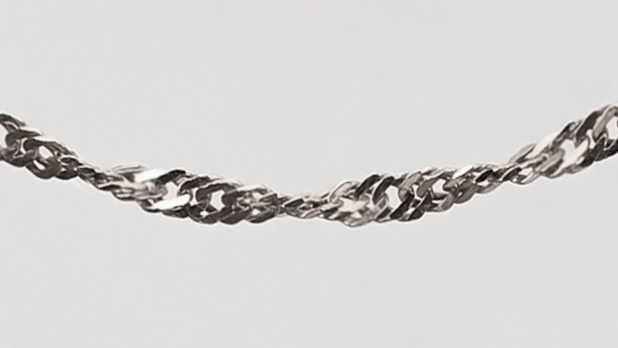
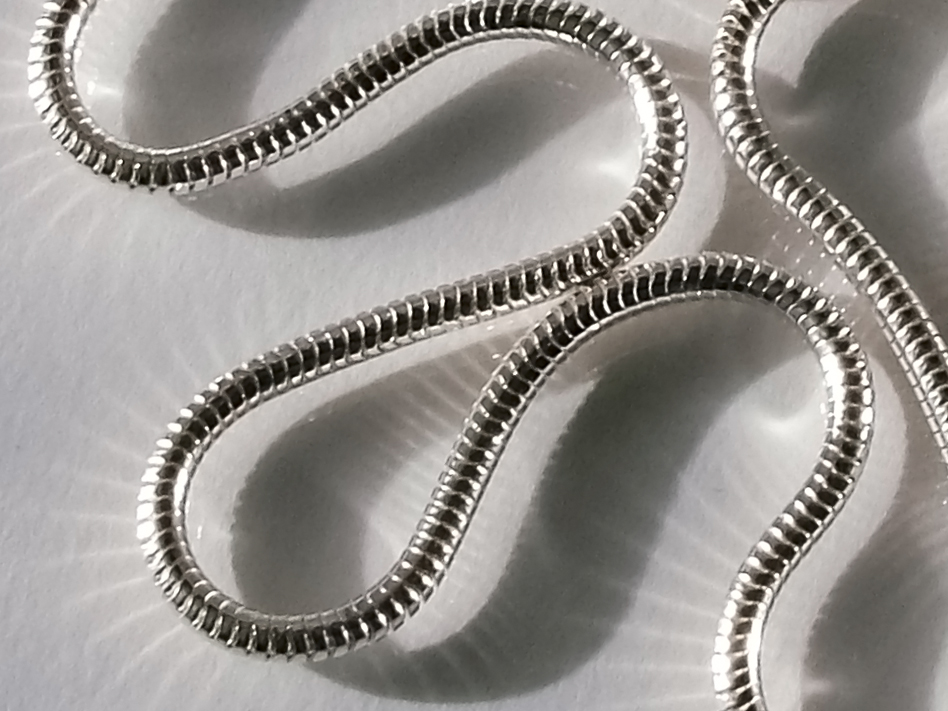
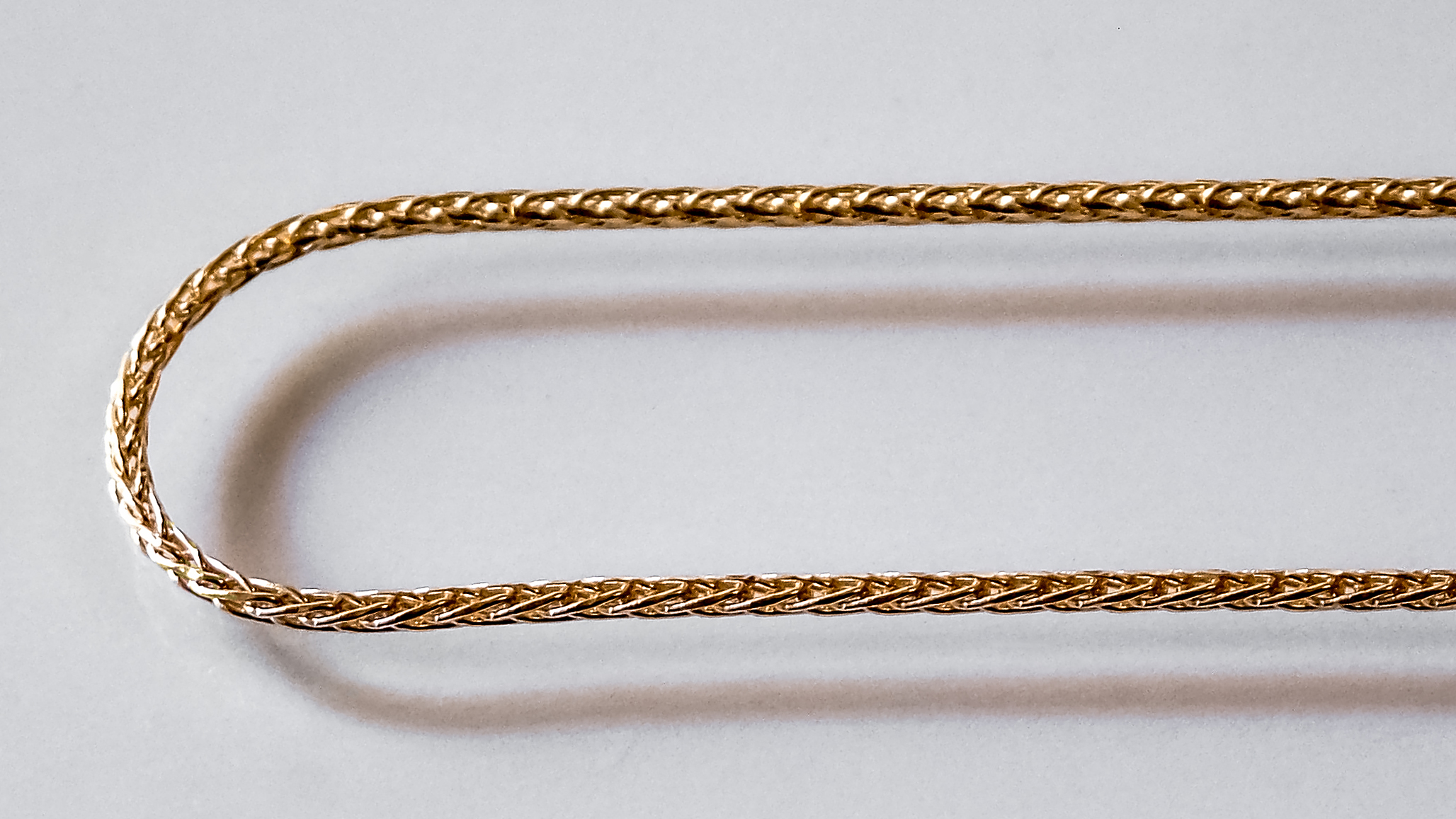
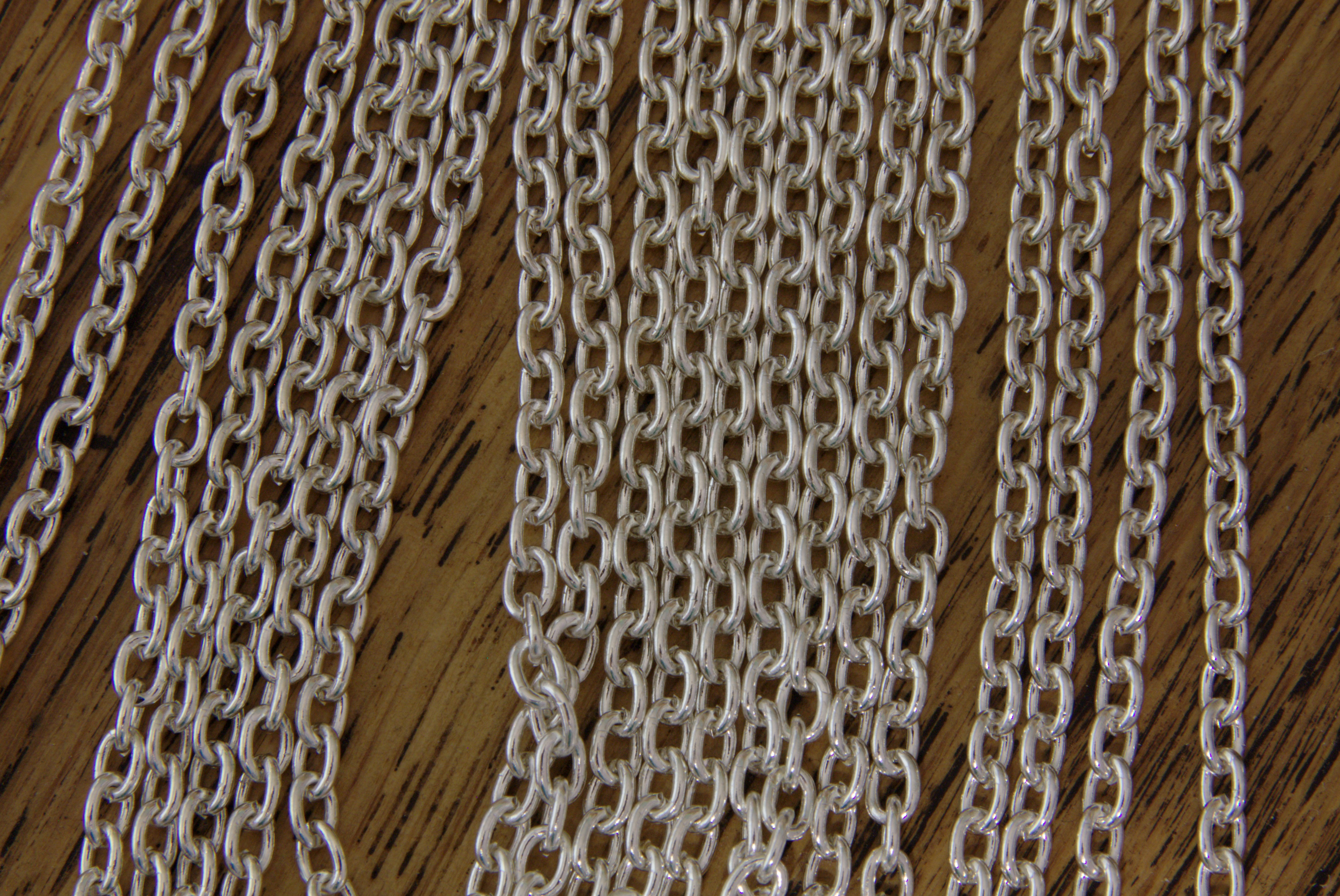
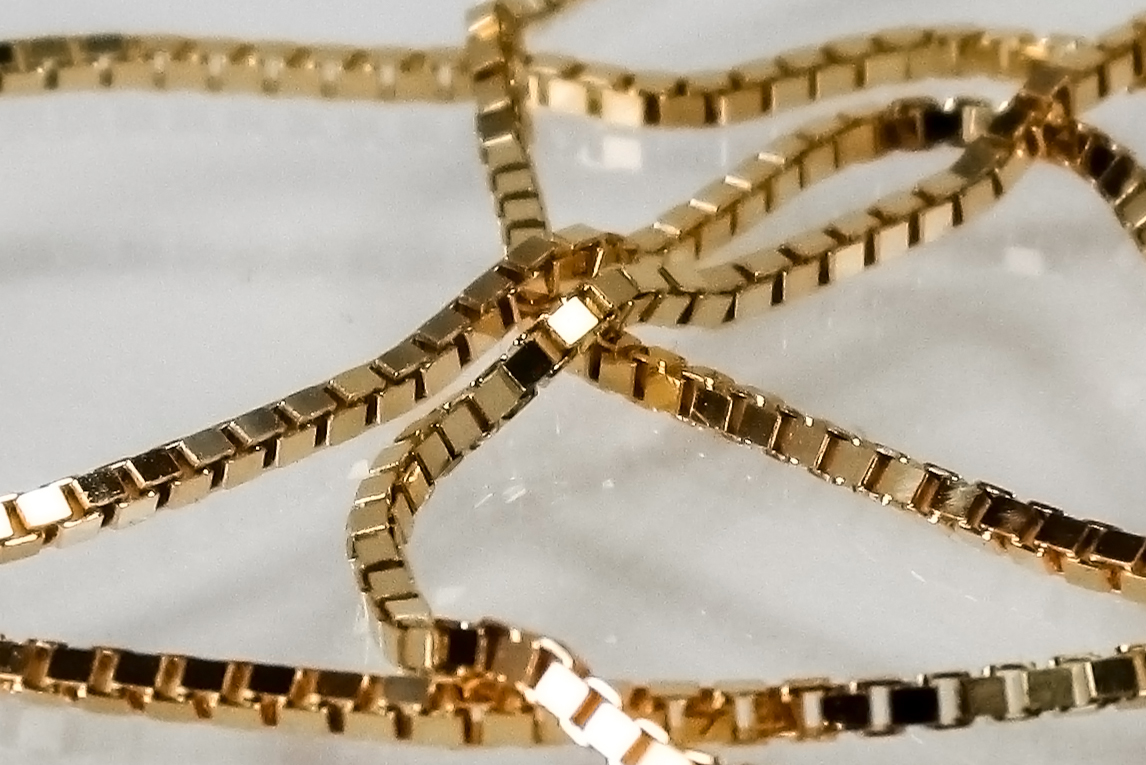
Chain	Image	Description
Anchor (I)		or Cable chain, copies the style of the chain that holds large anchors on ships. One of the simplest and most universal chains. The links are oval, made from round wire. Several versions have one or two of their sides ground flat and polished, giving the chain more sparkle through these facets. (pictured) This is called "Diamond cutting" of the chain. Anchor chains with very long and open links are often called Paperclip chains.
Anchor (II)		or Maritime, Marina or Stud link chain, this too copies the style of the chain that holds large anchors on ships but has an oval link with a dividing bar through the middle. The interlinking sections may be of a Curb or Trace style. There is also a version (pictured) of this style where only every other link is an anchor link.
Ball		or Bead chain, is formed of small balls of metal joined by small lengths of wire, not longer than each bead in between. Also has its own 'snap over the first link' fastening. Larger steel versions are more often used to hold ID cards than in jewellery, but finer ones may be found for the purpose.
Belcher		or Rolo, is similar to the Trace, but a Belcher chain link is wider than its thickness. Generally the links are rounded on the outside, but the shape of the link can vary.
Box		This is similar to the Venetian chain, but the links are looser and rectangular, whereas the Venetian's are always square and tighter.
Brick		or Serpentine chain, Cobra, Boston link, S-link, C-link or Flat link, is a semi-rigid chain, pressed so tightly that the links have almost fused into a solid band.
Byzantine		or Turkish, is an intricate design in which each link is connected to four other links, creating a woven appearance.
Cardano		Cardano chain characterised by its rounded retangular links which have been a raised dome on the surface to create a smooth feel. Interlocked closely together, the links allow for an effortless appearance whilst naturally creating a rigid curve that forms perfectly when worn.
Curb		(cf. Curb chain), Cuban or Twisted is when the links interlock with each other when laid flat. Some more open-link curb chains can only be distinguished from a trace by this method, while the denser curb chain known as closed curb keep their appearance whichever way they hang. This style of chain has the greatest variety of widths available, from a few millimeters to over four centimeters. The links can be round, flattened or faceted in a large variety of ways.
Fancy		A fancy chain can be anything; any form of fine metal that can be replicated and joined onto each other to make a chain. Many fancy chains are variations of the standard styles, for example a trace chain formed of heart-shaped links or a curb chain with every other link set with a gemstone.
Figaro		Figaro is not really a style but a popular variation of the Curb chain. A number of standard links (usually three) precede an elongated link all the way through. This variation can be replicated by many of the styles mentioned.
Foxtail		This chain gets its intricate V-shaped pattern from two rows of oval rings connected by flat rings in the middle. It can be shaped, twisted and hammered to become more square or rectangular.
Franco		The Franco chain with a square cut, has a V-shaped pattern on two sides, with the other two more resembling a Curb chain. It is more open than a Spiga or Foxtail, while resembling them at a distance. It's named after the Italian jeweler who designed it.
Omega		or more correctly Omega necklace, is a pseudo-chain made by assembling metallic plates on a wire or woven mesh. The plates give the appearance of links in a chain.
Prince Of Wales		This is a loose Rope chain. This chain consists of a twisting chain made of small circular links, where each single link has no less than four others joining into it. It resembles the Singapore, but is more loosely interlocked.
Rolo		The links of a Rolo chain are usually identical and often round. It is the most basic form of a chain. The links joined in a simple alternating sequence.
Rope		Creates the effect of two twisting strands spiraled together, created by many small links which are not completely joined. One disadvantage of this otherwise strong chain is that, when one link does break, the rest of the chain might follow in succession.
Saturn		also called Station or Bobble chain, is a chain with evenly spaced beads, discs or ovals upon the chain.
Scroll		also called Snail, S type, Meander or even Greek key chain since its design resembles old meander ornamentation.
Singapore		This chain may also be called Twisted Curb, but the links are joined in such a way that, even when the chain is untwisted, there is always a natural curve to it. Usually this chain is sold very fine and has a liquid-like look to it.
Snake		Snake chain is a very tight-linked chain that has a round or square cross-section and has links that create a slight zigzag look.
Spiga		or Wheat, is composed of twisted, interlocking links and has the appearance of a plaited wire or stalk of wheat. As each link passes through a total of 4 others, it is durable and resistant to stretching. Its rounded shape and flexibility makes it well suited for pendants and unlikely to snag.
Trace		A slender simple style version of the Cable or Anchor chain with small, uniform circular or oval links. Trace chains are typically very delicate, especially in finer widths.
Venetian		Venetian chains are very similar to Box chain, but the links are always square, whereas the Box chains are looser and rectangular.

== Video ==
Making a silver chain.

== See also ==
- Manin gold chain
