= Manin =

Manin may refer to:

== Places ==
- Manin, Syria, a town near Damascus
- Manin, Pas-de-Calais in France

== Other uses ==
- Manin (surname)
- Manin gold chain

== See also ==
- Turmanin, a town near Aleppo, Syria
