= Cuban link chain =

Style of jewellery chain

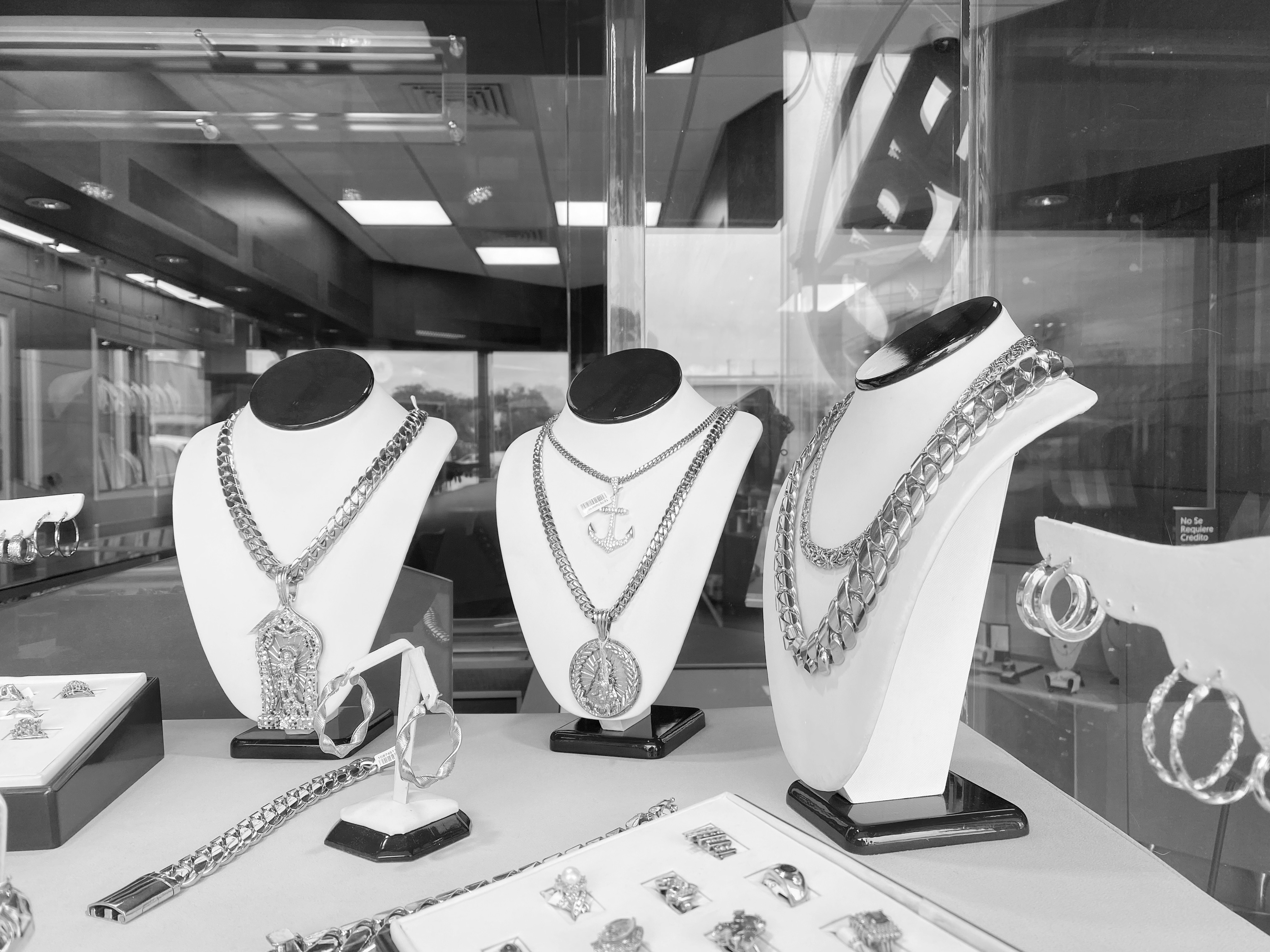
Jewelry store window in Miami, Florida showing Cuban link chains

Cuban link chain is a type of jewellery chain characterized by interlocking, uniform, and oval links that create a thick, rope-like appearance. It is derived from the classic curb chain. It is commonly made from precious metals such as gold, silver, or platinum and is often associated with luxury, hip-hop culture, and urban fashion. It is a highly versatile design. When it has a heavy, thicker appearance, it is primarily regarded as men's jewelry. However, it can be used in more delicate versions in women's jewelry and can be considered unisex. The design can also be used as bracelets and anklets.

== History ==
The Cuban link chain originated in the Cuban neighborhood of Miami, Florida, and rose to fame in the 1970s and 1980s where it became recognized among the city's Latin and hip-hop communities. It had a steep rise in interest in 2012 and since then continued to grow in popularity. Over time, it gained widespread recognition as rappers, athletes, and other celebrities adopted it as a status symbol.

== Design and characteristics ==
Cuban link chains are distinguished by their thick, interconnected oval links. The Cuban link chain is often worn without a pendant, although one can be strung on in usually less heavy variants. Oftentimes, it is fastened with a lobster clasp. They are available in various thicknesses, ranging from subtle, lightweight designs to oversized, heavy chains. They also have various colors such as yellow gold and rose gold. The most common variations include:

- Standard Cuban link chain – Features uniform, oval-shaped links with a smooth, polished finish.
- Miami Cuban link chain – A tighter, denser version with slightly more rounded links, considered the most iconic variation.
- Diamond Cuban link chain – Embedded with diamonds or other gemstones for a more extravagant appearance.
- LA Cuban link chain – Has thicker links and sharper filing to give a more punk style originating from Los Angeles.

== Production ==
Cuban link chains are primarily crafted from gold (yellow, white, or rose), though they can also be made from silver, platinum, or stainless steel. The most common gold karats in the United States for the chains are 10K, 14K, 18K, and 22K; 10K to 14K often strikes an optimal balance of affordability, purity, and durability. The chains are typically handmade or machine-crafted, with hand-crafted versions often being more expensive due to the precision and labor involved.

The production process begins with melting gold or other materials, often mixed with other metals for durability, into a solid bar. This bar is then repeatedly passed through a rolling machine to achieve the desired thickness before being drawn into a wire. The wire is coiled around a rod to create individual links, which are then cut, aligned, and soldered together using high heat and precise timing. Afterward, the chain undergoes filing, tightening, and polishing.

== Popularity and cultural significance ==
The Cuban link chain has been featured prominently in hip-hop culture, worn by artists such as Jay-Z, DJ Khaled, and Rihanna. It has made appearances in music videos, red carpet events, and other events.. Raekwon's album Only Built 4 Cuban Linx... is named for the Cuban link chain.

== Pricing ==
The cost of a Cuban link chain varies significantly based on factors such as material, weight, and craftsmanship. For example, the market price of gold plays a large role in the cost of a gold Cuban link chain. Simple silver or gold-plated versions can be relatively affordable ($30 USD), while solid gold and diamond-encrusted chains can range from thousands to millions of dollars. Former pastor and convicted felon Lamor Whitehead was robbed at gunpoint with a $390,000 USD Cuban link chain stolen from him. Gucci Mane has a Cuban link chain worth $2.5 million USD that weighs 10 kg and is composed of $300,000 USD worth of diamonds and may be the largest one ever made.

== See also ==
- Jewellery chain
- Hip-hop fashion
