= Omega chain =

Pseudo-chain made by assembling metallic plates on a wire or woven mesh

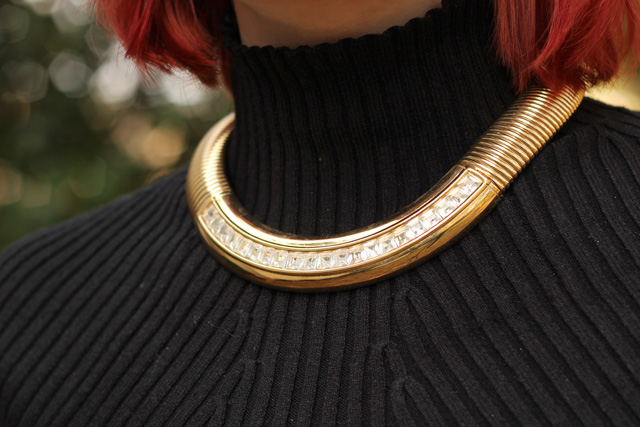
Givenchy vintage gold necklace consisting of a rigid centerpiece and a flexible omega chain around the back of the neck.

An omega chain or omega necklace is a pseudo-chain made by assembling metallic plates on a wire or woven mesh. The plates give the appearance of links in a chain. The embedded wire provides the strength, so the plates can be designed to please the eye.

== See also ==
- Persian weave
