= Figaro chain =

Jewellery chain

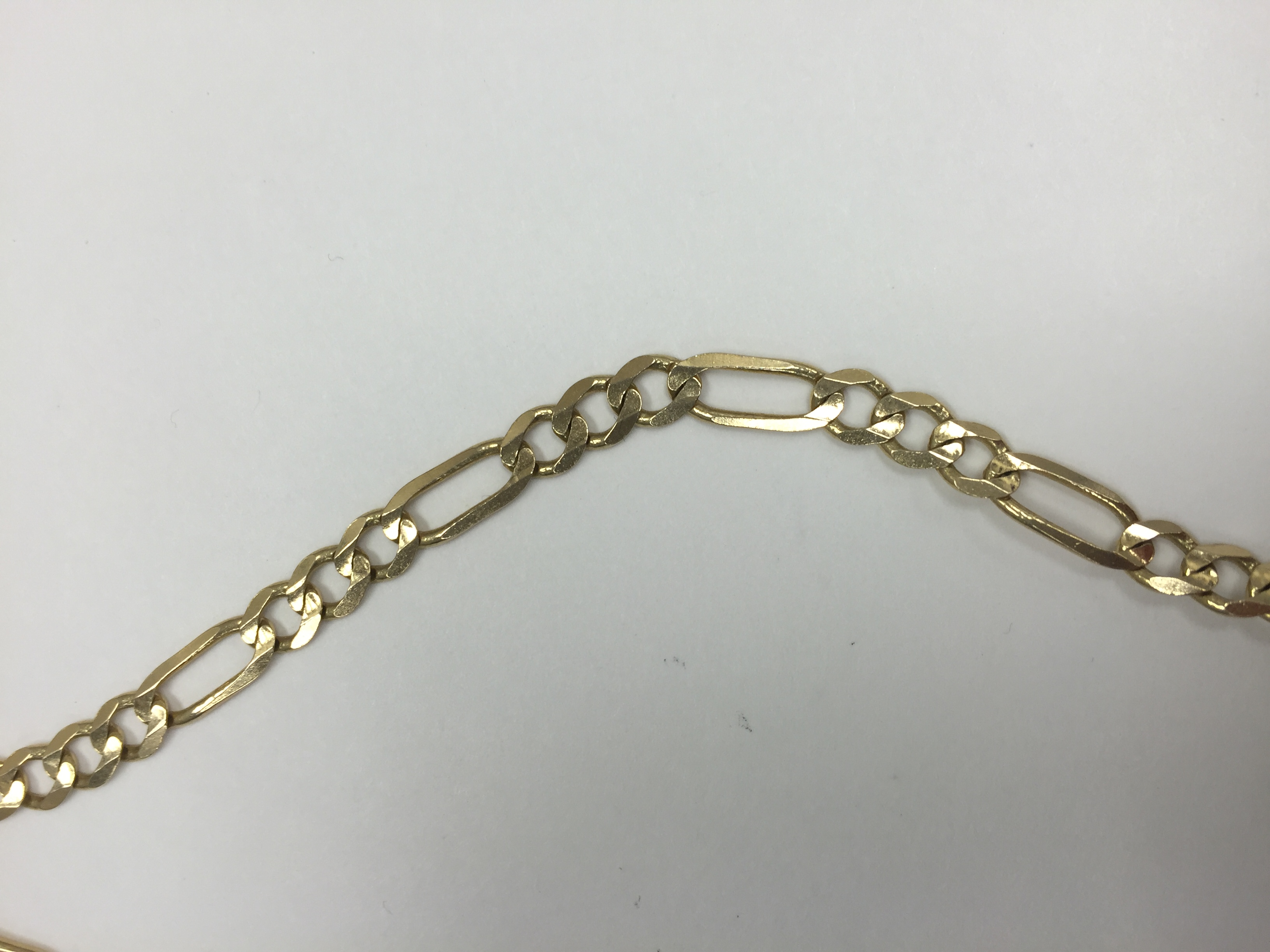
14 karat figaro chain

The figaro chain is a jewellery chain design consisting of three or more small circular links followed by one elongated oval link. The most notable figaro chains are manufactured in Italy. They are usually worn by men and are often adorned with pendants such as crosses and medallions.

The name of the design may have been inspired by the operas The Barber of Seville (by Gioachino Rossini) and The Marriage of Figaro (by Wolfgang Amadeus Mozart).

The origins of the figaro chain date back to one of Italy's most notable family of jewellers and goldsmiths, the Riccardi family.
