= Byzantine chain =

Design for chains used in jewelry

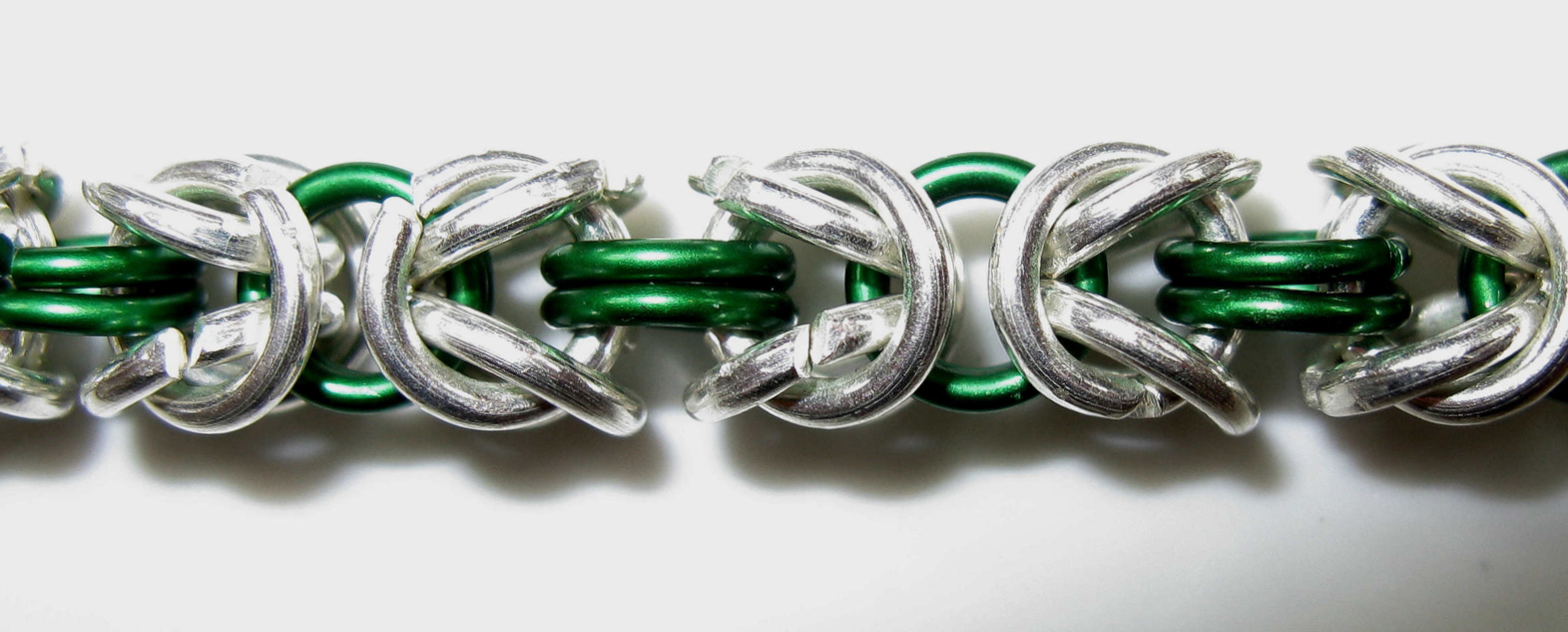
Close up on the chain maille bracelet

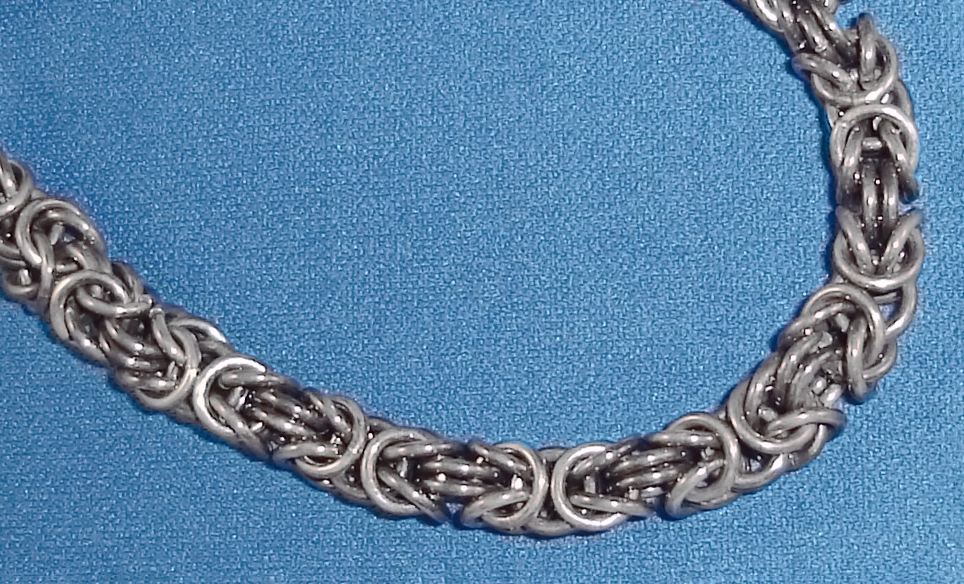
Byzantine weave chain mail silver bracelet.

A Byzantine chain is a metal intricate design used in jewelry that incorporates a rope-like texture and organic textural design. The chains are supple and flexible, and drape well. The origin of the name Byzantine is not known.

The chain is a 4 in 1 chain meaning that each link passes through four others. It is a variation on the Box chain whose links point in a constant direction, unlike Byzantine whose links alternate in direction.

The pattern has also been called 'Etruscan', 'Birdcage', 'Fool's Dilemma', 'Idiot's Trap', 'Idiot's Delight', and 'Bird's Nest' but Byzantine is the most common name.

== See also ==
- Jewellery chain
