= Lamor Whitehead =

American pastor, scammer and convicted felon (born 1978)

- Born: Lamor Miller-Whitehead; April 30, 1978 (age 48); Brooklyn, New York, U.S.
- Organization: Leaders of Tomorrow International Churches
- Criminal penalty: nine years at Sing Sing Correctional Facility
- Criminal status: Convicted felon
- Spouse: Asia DoeReis-Whitehead
- Children: 3
- Website: lotichurches.org

Lamor Miller-Whitehead, also known as "Pastor Bling Bling" (born April 30, 1978), is an American Protestant pastor known also for his close relationship with New York City Mayor Eric Adams and his ostentatious displays of wealth. In 2022, the high-profile pastor was robbed during a live-streamed service in Brooklyn. He was convicted of fraud in May 2024 and is currently jailed in New York. On June 18, 2024, he was sentenced to nine years for fraud.

== Early life and education ==
Whitehead was born in 1978. He claims he is the son of Arthur Miller Jr. who died in police custody following a traffic stop; however, Arthur Miller Jr. only has one son (who was 12 years old when his father was murdered) according to his surviving family's website. At the time of his death, Arthur had 4 children ages 8–16. Following high school, Whitehead secured athletic scholarship offers from Shaw University and Farmingdale University before studying accounting and videography at Eastern New Mexico University. Following his return to New York, he began a career as a mortgage broker.

Whitehead later studied at New York Theological Seminary. He completed his studies with a Ministry in Human Services certificate from the Theological Institution of Rising Hope Inc., which is accredited through Nyack College. He is a licensed New York State Chaplain and a certified marriage and funeral officiant.

== Loan default, arrest, and conviction for identity theft ==
In 2004, Suffolk County, New York police received complaints from nine residents claiming that their identities were being used to purchase Range Rover cars. After arresting one suspect, the newly formed Identity Theft Investigation Unit began to pursue Whitehead, who had shared the same address as the first suspect.

The following year, Whitehead took a $200,000 personal loan from conductor Maximo Bragado-Darman and his son, Julio Bragado-Young. According to a lawsuit, Whitehead promised to repay the loan in one month along with $25,000. Whitehead defaulted and Bragado-Darman successfully sued Whitehead in 2008 for $306,000. As of 2022, Whitehead continues to owe Bragado-Daman $261,000 following a court judgement.

Later in 2005, Whitehead was living in Teaneck, New Jersey. Whitehead filed for personal bankruptcy in 2006. Following a criminal complaint, he was arrested by the Suffolk County Police Department's Identity Theft Unit in Upper Manhattan while driving a maroon Range Rover. Following the arrest, police discovered that Whitehead was operating an extensive fraud and identity theft operation to take out more than $2 million in loans and purchase motor vehicles. More than 50 victims were identified from states including Tennessee, Georgia, and New York. Whitehead was charged with multiple counts of identity theft and convicted in 2008. He served five years in Sing Sing Correctional Facility before being released in 2013. After his release in 2013, Whitehead founded the Leaders of Tomorrow Ministry. The website of the church Whitehead founded claimed that "...he was illegally convicted and sentenced..." and that he "...was released after his sentence was overturned...".

== 2022 robbery and aftermath ==
Whitehead and his wife were robbed at gunpoint in July 2022. Thieves allegedly stole jewelry, which Whitehead alleged to have included a Cuban link chain valued at $399,000 and a Rolex watch valued at $75,000. The event took place while Whitehead was leading services at his Leaders of Tomorrow International Church in Brooklyn and was streamed live. In September that year, two men were arrested and charged with the robbery. The suspects were also charged with conspiracy and possession of firearms. A third suspect was shot and killed by U.S. Marshals in January 2024 at a South Brunswick, New Jersey inn.

Following the robbery, Whitehead sued a local radio host for $50 million, claiming that the host defamed him during her program while making comments about the robbery.

== 2024 fraud conviction ==
In 2021, Whitehead was sued in New York by a former congregant who claimed he defrauded her of $90,000. According to the complaint, in November 2020, Whitehead promised to assist Pauline Anderson in improving her credit score as well as purchasing and renovating a house in exchange for a $90,000 investment. Whitehead further promised to repay Anderson in full as well as $100 each month until the property was fully renovated. Further, Anderson claims in the complaint that in May 2021, Whitehead texted her and said the $90,000 was not an “investment”, but rather a “campaign contribution” that Whitehead was under no obligation to repay.

Whitehead denied the accusations in court and proclaimed to his social media followers that he was innocent, including flashing confidential court documents on camera during a livestream ahead of the trial conclusion. He was convicted and remanded to jail in May 2024. On June 17, 2024, Whitehead was sentenced to nine years in prison.

He had initially sued comedian Tasha K for accusing him of fraud. However, the judge dismissed the case citing that the comedian was telling the truth.

== Friendship with Eric Adams and political aspirations ==
Eric Adams and Whitehead struck up a friendship that goes back to 2013. While Adams was Brooklyn Borough President, Whitehead appeared by his side at numerous high-profile events beginning in 2016. During Adams' campaign for Borough President, Whitehead falsely claimed that he had created a collaborative justice initiative with the Brooklyn District Attorney. In August 2013, Adams introduced Whitehead at a concert, calling the pastor “my good friend and good brother.” Whitehead used this to start a bogus youth program.

Whitehead ran for Brooklyn Borough President in 2021.

In 2022, Whitehead was thought to have worked with Adams to arrange the surrender of man suspected of shooting another rider on the subway. Whitehead arrived for the surrender at a Manhattan police precinct driving a gray Rolls-Royce.

== Personal life ==
Whitehead became well known for his ostentatious displays of wealth in his relatively modest neighborhood of Canarsie. In addition to owning a large wardrobe, Whitehead has been known to drive around New York in a Rolls-Royce.

Along with his conviction for identity theft, Whitehead was arrested twice in 2015 on claims of child abuse and violating an order of protection. Charges in all cases were dismissed. Whitehead owes over $65,000 in child support to his first wife, Laesha.

Whitehead is a cousin of musician Foxy Brown.

Whitehead is married to Asia DosReis-Whitehead and has three children.

In April 2015, Asia DoeReis-Whitehead was diagnosed with Guillain-Barre syndrome and was hospitalized for many months. Following her recovery, she formed the nonprofit organization UaReACHAMPION Empowerment Network.

== Real estate holdings ==
Whitehead owns a mansion in Paramus, New Jersey. The home is 9,000 square feet with six bedrooms and seven bathrooms. Whitehead purchased the home in 2019 for $1.64 million and put it on the market in 2022 for $2.99 million, making it the most expensive listing in the town at the time.

In 2021, Whitehead, through his company Whitehead Estates LLC, completed the purchase of a series of apartments in Hartford, Connecticut. He took out a mortgage of $4.15 million for the purchase and borrowed an additional amount in February 2022, raising the total debt to $4.5 million. Whitehead's property in Connecticut was foreclosed on April 29, 2024, and his Paramus, NJ, property was foreclosed on May 31, 2024.
