= Manin (surname) =

Manin is a surname. In Slavic countries it is used for males, while the feminine counterpart is Manina. Notable people with the surname include:

- Christophe Manin (born 1966), French cyclist
- Daniele Manin (1804–1857), Italian statesman and patriot of the period of Italian unification
- Ludovico Manin (1725–1802), last Doge of Venice
- Tamara Manina (born 1934), Russian gymnast and sports scientist
- Tunka Manin (1010–1078), ruler of the Ghana Empire
- Yuri Manin (1937–2023), mathematician
