= Rope chain =

Type of necklace

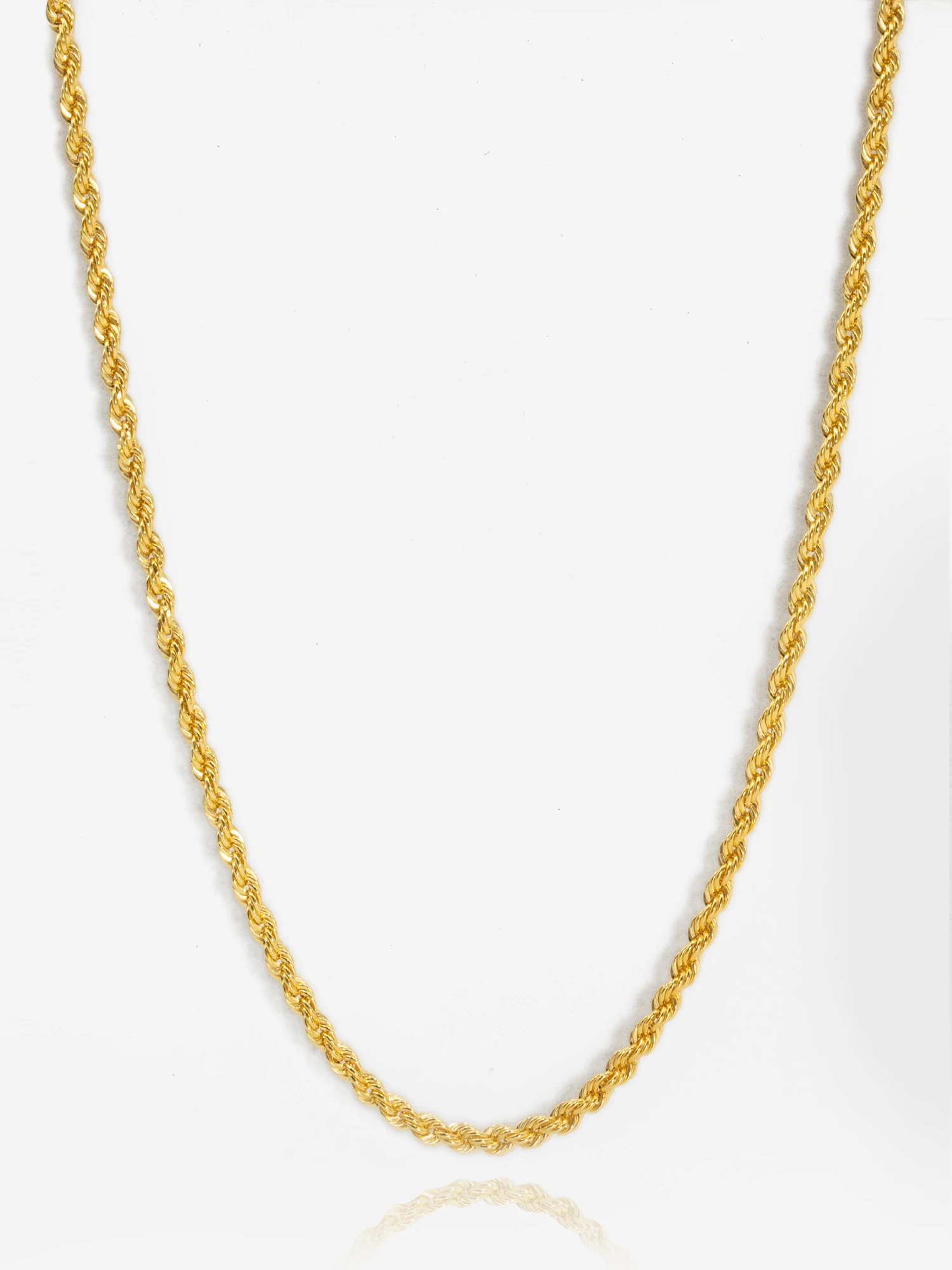
Gold rope chain

A rope chain is a metal chain necklace consisting of several small links which pattern the shape of a rope. The rope chain begins as a metal wire and is twisted into links.

The style is immensely popular throughout the world. These chains are most popular in silver and gold but can also be made with other metals as well.

Rope chains are made from twisted links that create a spiraled pattern, giving them more texture and light reflection than simpler styles such as cable chains. Diamond-cut versions enhance shine further as light catches multiple angled surfaces.

They sit stylistically between other chain types: more detailed than curb chains, less sleek than snake chains, and more dimensional than Figaro chains. Rope chains are versatile and can be worn alone, layered with other necklaces, or paired with pendants (especially on slimmer or medium-width versions).

When choosing a rope chain, key factors include width (thin for subtle or layering use, medium for everyday versatility, thick for a bolder statement), length (which affects how the chain sits and interacts with clothing), and finish (polished for a classic look or diamond-cut for greater reflectivity). Sterling silver is a common material due to its durability and shine.

The rope chain is popular within the Hip hop community and was popularized by Golden age rap groups, Run D.M.C. as well as Eric B. & Rakim.
