= Manin gold chain =

Type of Venetian jewellery

A Manin chain (Italian: catena manin or catena d'oro Manin) is a type of Venetian jewellery made of tiny gold links. The name comes from the Italian word manina (tiny hand) because of the painstaking work required to form the links; it has also been proposed that the name refers to the Manin family, including Ludovico Manin, the last Doge of Venice. The chain is formed of special links made of tiny rings with a concave cross-section welded together. The rings were so small that 15 centimetres (5.9 in) of chain could be made from 1 gram of gold, with about 20 rings per centimeter.

Historically, chains could be several meters long. They were worn wrapped as opulent chokers; women would divide the length of the necklace among their daughters, which is one reason that examples of very long Manin chains are quite rare.

== History ==
The technique used to make Manin chains is believed to have been learned by Venetians from Byzantine jewelers in Constantinople in the 6th century. It involved using a glass bottle filled with water as a magnifying glass to see the links.

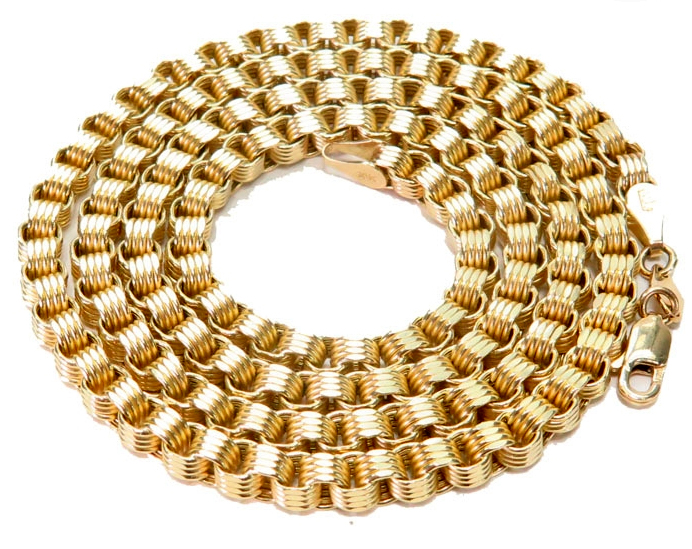
Venetian Gold Chain

Venetian gold chain, 1880s circa.
