= History of WFAN =

History of sports radio station WFAN in New York City

The New York Sports radio WFAN, first broadcast on July 1, 1987 at 1050AM replacing WHN. WFAN was the first all sports station in the United States. The station's current frequency, 660AM. was formerly known as WNBC and first transmitted on March 2, 1922. WFAN moved to 660AM at 5:30PM Eastern Time on October 7, 1988 when WNBC signed off for the last time.

== Early history ==
The 660 AM frequency in New York originated as WEAF on March 2, 1922, owned by AT&T. In 1926, WEAF became the flagship station of the NBC Red Network, one of two radio chains operated by the National Broadcasting Company. By 1928, WEAF was purchased by NBC's parent company, the Radio Corporation of America.

As a result of the North American Regional Broadcasting Agreement of 1941, WEAF became a clear-channel station and could be heard across most of the eastern half of North America at night. In 1943, the United States Supreme Court, citing antitrust concerns, ordered RCA to sell off one of its radio networks. The company decided to keep the Red Network, and it was rebranded as the NBC Radio Network after the Blue Network was divested to Edward J. Noble.

WEAF's call letters were changed to WNBC in 1946, then to WRCA in 1954, and back to WNBC in 1960. During the 1960s, WNBC relied less on network programming and adopted a talk format, followed by a switch to a middle-of-the-road music sound. The station spent much of the 1970s and early 1980s flipping between the Top 40 and adult contemporary formats, with varying success. By the middle of the 1980s, WNBC played less music and relied more on personality-driven talk programs with hosts such as Don Imus, Howard Stern, Joey Reynolds, Alan Colmes, and Soupy Sales.

== The beginning of WFAN ==
Meanwhile, at 3:00 p.m. on July 1, 1987, Emmis Communications-owned country music station WHN changed its call letters to WFAN and branded itself as the world's first 24-hour-per-day sports talk station. The first voice heard on WFAN was that of Suzyn Waldman, with a sports update, followed by the first show, which was hosted by Jim Lampley. Waldman reported for the station, covering the New York Yankees and New York Knicks, for 14 years. Ann Liguori was the first woman to host a call-in sports show on WFAN when her ‘Hey Liguori, What’s the Story’ show debuted on Saturday morning, July 4, 1987. Her first show featured an exclusive interview with Doc Gooden, the Mets star pitcher from their 1986 World Series win, who had recently gotten out of Smithers Rehab. Ann continued to host a weekly show on WFAN for 26 years and continues as the station's golf and tennis correspondent, covering The Majors. Other hosts besides Lampley in the 1050 kHz years included Bill Mazer, Pete Franklin, Greg Gumbel, Art Shamsky, and Ed Coleman. WFAN also inherited the radio broadcast rights to the defending World Series champion New York Mets, which WHN had held since 1983.

In early 1988, General Electric, which now owned NBC through its purchase of RCA two years earlier, announced that it would sell the NBC Radio division. In February of that year, GE completed a multi-station deal with Emmis and, in New York City, the WNBC license for 660 was included in the sale. On October 7, 1988 at 5:30 p.m., WFAN moved down the radio dial to replace WNBC at 660 kHz. The last voice heard on WNBC was that of Alan Colmes, who counted down the seconds to WNBC's demise with the legendary NBC chimes (the notes G-E-C) playing in the background. After 66 years, the long history of NBC radio in New York had come to an end.

In the complicated switch that saw WFAN move to the 660 frequency, the 1050 frequency that was formerly the home of WFAN became that of Spanish-language WUKQ, owned by Spanish Broadcasting System. However, SBS already owned an AM station in the market, Newark-based WSKQ at 620 kHz, and in those days Federal Communications Commission (FCC) rules stipulated that companies could own only one AM station per market. As a result, SBS received a temporary waiver to run 1050 while exploring the sale of either AM frequency. SBS chose to keep 620 (it is now WSNR), and 1050 was traded to Forward Communications, which owned WEVD, then at 97.9 FM. After that deal was approved, WEVD's call letters and programming moved to 1050 AM (it is now WEPN and ironically a sports station), and SBS took over 97.9 as WSKQ-FM. The October NBC-Emmis switch also saw Emmis's WQHT (then at 103.5 MHz.) move to 97.1 MHz., which had been the home of NBC's WYNY. Emmis sold the 103.5 frequency to Westwood One, who also acquired the WYNY call letters and its country music format.

In all this, WFAN retired two of the oldest radio call letters from the dawn of commercial radio: WHN and WNBC.

== After the switch ==
One of the keys to WFAN's early success on 660 was acquiring Don Imus to do the morning show. WFAN's original morning show on 1050 was hosted by Greg Gumbel. The show was a straightforward sports show, but was not doing well in the ratings. At the time of the switch, sports talk radio was still an untested format with questionable prospects, and the idea of bringing on board a host that appealed to a broader audience would get more people to try the station out. WFAN also benefitted from the inertia from Imus's fans who were used to tuning into 660AM on weekday mornings to listen to Imus on WNBC. WFAN instantly took advantage of its Imus inheritance, for example, it featured a special live monologue by Imus character Billy Sol Hargus from Shea Stadium moments after taking over the 660 frequency.

It quickly became apparent that WFAN's gambit of bringing Imus on board worked. Ratings for the morning show were strong, and it was successful to a point in driving ratings for the rest of WFAN's programming day. This model of using a general-interest morning host for a sports talk radio station (especially at launch) has been used at other sports radio stations across the country and proved that sports radio could indeed be a profitable format.

WFAN was also the first station in the country to roll out sports updates every 20 minutes. These updates, called 20-20 Sports Flashes, are now considered an industry standard. When WFAN first started updates were done every 15 minutes. Additionally, in a nod to the former WNBC, update anchors often end their top-of-the-hour updates with the catchphrase "And that's what's happening...", which is how WNBC on-air news readers had ended their updates.

Other programming that WFAN had at its launch included a mid-morning show with Ed Coleman and Mike Francesa, and an afternoon drive time show with Pete Franklin, who in Cleveland had become one of the first polarizing, outrageous talk show hosts. During his stay in New York, Franklin was probably best known for an incident where he used a four-letter expletive on air, in error, when trying to say "All you folks" (he was not disciplined for the incident.)

Running a close second was a 30-second Franklin diatribe on whether he had been offensive – "Do I offend anyone? I'm not here to offend you, dammit!" – that has been replayed ever since, especially on the July 1 WFAN anniversaries.

In a further drive to boost ratings, Imus instigated a feud with Franklin, much as he had with Howard Stern at WNBC in the mid-1980s. Both Imus and Franklin took shots at each other during their shows, Franklin calling Imus "Minus" and Imus recording parodies of radio commercials where he bashed Franklin as a "dinosaur", among other things. Franklin left WFAN in August 1989.

On September 5, 1989, a jointly hosted afternoon drive show with Francesa and Christopher "Mad Dog" Russo - who had been a weekend/fill-in host to that time - would premiere. The Mike and the Mad Dog show became the defining show of WFAN, one of the most consistently popular radio shows in New York, and one of the most influential sports talk radio shows in the country.

== Recent history ==
Over the years WFAN has continued to have a broad-based sports talk and play-by-play format. WFAN ratings gradually rose and at some points it was the top-billing station in New York and the country. In 1992 Emmis sold WFAN to Infinity Broadcasting, which would be purchased by Westinghouse Electric Corporation – CBS' then-parent company—in 1997, ironically, making WNBC's old frequency a sister station to its former rival WCBS 880AM

WFAN's broadcast day begins at 6:00 a.m. (Eastern time) with Boomer and Carton, hosted by former NFL quarterback Boomer Esiason and radio veteran Craig Carton. As of September 13, 2017, Craig Carton officially resigned from the Boomer & Carton show following alleged fraudulent activities in running a ticket reseller business. The new morning co-host is Gregg Giannotti. The midday timeslot is now called “Moose and Maggie, co-hosted by Marc Malusis who has been with WFAN for 15 years and Maggie Gray. As of 2022 they have been replaced with Tiki Barber & Brandon Tierney. The new midday hosts are Brandon Tierney and Sal Licata.

The afternoon drive slot is now hosted by Evan Roberts and former New York Giant football player Tiki Barber. Joe Beningo retired from that spot in late 2020.

On Monday nights during the NFL season, Kimberly Jones hosts a football show leading into the Monday Night Football broadcast, working during the 2009 season with former NFL players Roman Oben. Jones, who was a member of the Yankees' broadcast team on YES, also hosts other shows during the baseball off-season or when regular hosts are on vacation.

John Jastremski who was the winner of the 2011 Fantasy Phenom contest, hosts weeknights or following coverage of live game broadcasts. Jastremski is no longer with the station. He also hosts "Odds on Sports", a half hour sports gambling program that offers insight into the lines of the games. Keith McPherson currently hosts the 7PM to 12 Midnight shift. Other overnight hosts include Sal Licata, Chris McMonigle and Danielle McCarten . Another WFAN host is longtime New York rock radio fixture Richard Neer.

WFAN stands out in that all of its sports-talk shows are currently local in origin, not syndicated as is the practice of most sports-talk radio stations (usually except during the morning and/or drive-time periods).

Over the years WFAN has established a tight bond with its listeners, to the point where one of them eventually landed a regular on-air spot. Joe Benigno had been a frequent caller to "The Fan" (especially the Mike and the Mad Dog show) as "Joe from Saddle River", and his calls were typically interesting and insightful. In 1994 he was chosen to host a one-hour show during a promotion where listeners were invited to host a show. The test went well, and he later parlayed it into a regular overnight shift, which started in 1995.

WFAN also features the "20-20 Flash", a one- to two-minute update on sports scores and news, which occurs every 20 minutes (on the hour, twenty after and forty after). The update team consists of Rich Ackerman (no longer) Harris Allen (no longer), Mike McCann, Erica Herskowitz, Bob Heussler (no longer) Marc Malusis (no longer, John Minko (no longer, Jerry Recco and Greg Tartaglia (no longer). The station also employs beat reporters to cover the Mets (Ed Coleman), Yankees (Sweeny Murti, no longer), Jets (Peter Schwartz) and Giants (Paul Dottino).

In 2010, the station was honored by the National Association of Broadcasters with the Marconi award for Sports Station of the Year.

=== Team coverage ===
Currently, WFAN airs the MLB's New York Yankees, the NFL's New York Giants, the NHL's New Jersey Devils, and the NBA's Brooklyn Nets. During baseball season, the Yankees have first priority of airtime over all other teams, and WFAN shifts some early-season Giants games over to one of its sister FM stations (currently WXRK or WCBSFM). This is done in part because of the Mets' legacy on the station, and also because the Giants, Devils, and Nets all produce their own games and purchase their airtime from WFAN. During the fall and early winter (when NFL, NHL, and NBA seasons overlap), the Giants have first priority, followed by the Devils and lastly the Nets.

Bloomberg L.P.-owned WBBR (1130 AM) is utilized as WFAN's main "conflict" station for Devils games due to scheduling conflicts with the Mets and Giants (some preseason Devils contests have been streamed on WFAN's website due to such conflicts). Either WBBR or Inner City Broadcasting-owned WLIB (1190 AM) will broadcast any Nets games when they and any of the other teams play simultaneously.

WFAN is also a promotional partner of the Yankees, as sister station WCBS has been the team's flagship station since 2002. WFAN has exclusive game-day rights to broadcast at the ballpark. The exclusive access seems to give WFAN an information edge over WEPN, which features Yankees television voice Michael Kay in drive-time. Kay is often forced to do his show from outside the stadium, and then leave an hour before the game to prepare for the TV broadcast. Yankees announcers from YES and WCBS occasionally host shows on WFAN throughout the year, including John Sterling, Suzyn Waldman and Kimberly Jones.

The station is the flagship outlet for Westwood One's NFL and NCAA radio broadcasts, though all local teams have priority, with the exception of NFL playoff games.

WFAN has marketed itself in recent years as the "Flagship Station for New York Sports", but its close partnerships with the Mets and Yankees could easily render it "New York's Baseball Station." Terry Collins and Joe Girardi, once managers of the Mets and Yankees, made exclusive appearances on WFAN during the season; now Yankee manager Aaron Boone appears weekly. WFAN usually also contracts at least one Giants and one Jets player to make exclusive appearances on the station during the NFL season, as well as longtime Giants head coach Tom Coughlin, ex-head coach Ben Mcadoo and former head coach Pat Shurmur.

The station was also the longtime radio home for the New York Jets, New York Rangers, and New York Knicks (the latter two were inherited from WNBC). Currently, WFAN's primary competition is WEPN, the New York ESPN Radio affiliate, located at WFAN's old 1050 kHz frequency. WEPN carries the three aforementioned teams plus national ESPN Radio programming, all of which WFAN previously broadcast.

On April 11, 2006, WFAN started streaming live on the Internet. Web streaming of live games, however, is limited due to broadcast rights (Mets and Nets games are offered separately through the MLB and NBA websites as annual subscriptions). As of April 2010, WFAN, along with other CBS Radio stations, stopped streaming live on the Internet to listeners outside of the United States.

=== Radiothon ===
Each spring from 1990 until 2007, WFAN conducted the "WFAN Radiothon" to benefit children's charities that seek to ensure the continuity of life in its earliest stages and the treatment and eventual elimination of childhood cancer. The three most recent beneficiaries of the radiothon were Tomorrow's Children's Fund, the CJ Foundation for SIDS, and the Imus Ranch. WFAN has also done other radiothons and special broadcasts to raise money for assorted charities.

On August 15, 2008, Mike Francesa announced during the final broadcast of Mike and the Mad Dog that WFAN would broadcast a new fundraising radiothon. The new fundraiser would benefit both the Boomer Esiason Foundation for cystic fibrosis research, and the Mike Francesa Champions of the Heart Foundation, a new charity created by Francesa. The first radiothon took place in September 2008.

=== Midday show controversy ===
The midday slot has been one of the better slots from a ratings perspective for WFAN. However, this slot's hosts have often found controversy.

In the early 1990s, popular hosts Ed Coleman and Dave Sims had their show cancelled. WFAN then announced that New York Daily News columnist Mike Lupica and WNBC-TV sports anchor Len Berman would co-host the new midday program. The show seemed all set to go when, at the last minute, Berman decided to back out of the show. He cited that he would have to work a near 14-hour day, combining his 10 a.m. start on radio with his 11:20 p.m. report on television. WFAN would not let Berman out of his contract, and as a result, the slot was split into two shows: Lupica hosted from 10 a.m. to noon, while Berman hosted from noon to 2 p.m.. The split format did not work, and eventually Berman's show would be cancelled and Lupica's show soon followed.

WWOR-TV sports anchor Russ Salzberg, who also worked an evening sportscast, was more than willing to assume the midday show duties. In 1995, he was joined by longtime overnight host Steve Somers. This show, billed as The Sweater and the Schmoozer, featured one of the most famous incidents in WFAN history. It occurred when Salzberg "banned" Eli from Westchester from calling his show due to his comments that Salzberg considered to be inappropriate. Salzberg notoriously said to Somers, during another Atlanta Braves World Series appearance talking about Braves' manager Bobby Cox: "What about Cox, Steve? You like Cox... don't you, Steve?"

In 1999, with the ratings not being what WFAN management expected, the Salzberg/Somers show was cancelled. Initially Somers had been fired with Salzberg, but a large outcry from listeners—including comedian Jerry Seinfeld, a native of Long Island – led to WFAN management giving Somers the evening shift; Somers no longer has a regular shift tho he does very occasional fill-ins, mostly during December holidays. In middays, Salzberg and Somers were replaced by Suzyn Waldman and Jody McDonald. Waldman was best known for her work covering the Yankees and Knicks for the station. McDonald, son of a former Mets general manager, was the weekend overnight host before leaving for sister station WIP in Philadelphia, nearer to his southern New Jersey home. Both Waldman and McDonald had their fans and detractors at WFAN.

Waldman would leave WFAN in late 2001, joining the Yankees television broadcast team the following year. She would be replaced by Sid Rosenberg who, despite his shock jock reputation, had an enormous knowledge of sports. Many felt there was great chemistry between McDonald and Rosenberg. However, the ratings still weren't what WFAN expected and in 2004 McDonald was let go, later to join WEPN, Sirius Satellite Radio, and WPEN radio in Philadelphia. Overnight host Joe Benigno would replace McDonald.

Rosenberg was forced to resign from WFAN on September 12, 2005 after being given an ultimatum by station management for not showing up to host the New York Giants' pregame show the day before. Benigno hosted the show solo for over a year, and on January 2, 2007, part-time overnight host Evan Roberts became Benigno's new midday co-host. The pairing continues to consistently out-rate rival station WEPN.

=== Twentieth anniversary ===
On July 1, 2007, WFAN celebrated its twentieth anniversary. On the weekend of July 4, past WFAN hosts such as Suzyn Waldman and Jim Lampley did guest-hosting stints, and the station's current hosts provided career and station retrospectives throughout the weekend. The station also invited listeners to vote on the "Greatest New York sports moments", and the "Top 20 New York sports celebrities", during WFAN's 20-year history.

=== Twenty-fifth anniversary ===
On 11 June 2012, 'Top 10 Moments in WFAN History' were announced.

On 25 June 2012, notable current and former staff members announced their favorite moments, interviews, and teams.

=== Move to Manhattan ===
On 10 October 2009, WFAN moved from the landmark Kaufman-Astoria Studios in Astoria, Queens, its first studio, after 22 years. The station began broadcasting from CBS Radio's new New York studios at 345 Hudson Street in Manhattan's Hudson Square neighborhood. WFAN shares the building with four other CBS Radio stations – WCBS-FM, WINS, WNEW-FM, and WNYL. Along with the move, the station changed its longtime call-in phone number from 1-718-937-6666 to 1-877-337-6666.

== See also ==
- WFAN
