= Mike Westhoff =

American football coach (born 1948)

Personal information
- Born: January 10, 1948 (age 78); Bethel Park, Pennsylvania, U.S.

Career information
- College: Wichita State

Career history
- Indiana (1974) Graduate assistant; Indiana (1975) Freshman coach; Dayton (1976) Offensive line coach; Indiana State (1977) Defensive line coach & linebackers coach; Northwestern (1978–1980) Offensive line coach; Texas Christian (1981) Offensive line coach; Indianapolis Colts (1982–1984) Offensive line, tight ends & special teams coach; Arizona Outlaws (1985) Offensive line coach; Miami Dolphins (1986–2000) Tight ends coach & special teams coach; New York Jets (2001–2012) Special teams coach; New Orleans Saints (2017–2018) Special teams coach; Denver Broncos (2023–2024) Assistant head coach

Mike Westhoff (born January 10, 1948) is an American former professional football coach who spent a total of 33 seasons coaching in the National Football League (NFL). He primarily coached special teams for a number of teams, most notably for the New York Jets, Miami Dolphins, and New Orleans Saints. In 2024, he stepped down from his position as assistant head coach for the Denver Broncos due to health reasons. Westhoff is considered to be among the greatest special teams coaches in league history.

== Coaching career ==
=== Miami Dolphins ===
Westhoff was the special teams and tight ends coach for the Miami Dolphins from 1986 to 2000.

=== New York Jets ===
Westhoff joined the Jets staff in 2001.

He stepped down as the special teams coach for the New York Jets in December 2007 after the final game. On September 1, 2008, it was announced Westhoff would return to the Jets' sideline for the 2008 season in an undefined role.

On August 8, 2010, Westhoff received a one-year contract extension. Westhoff remained with the team through 2011, which he announced would likely be his final year with the team. However, on January 26, 2012, the Jets announced that they had given Westhoff a contract extension through the 2012 season. Westhoff officially retired after the 2012 season.

=== New Orleans Saints ===
On November 15, 2017, the New Orleans Saints had hired Westhoff to join their special teams coaching staff for the remainder of the 2017 season. The next day, Saints head coach Sean Payton said that Westhoff would be responsible for supervising all the special teams units.

Following the controversial loss in the 2018 NFC Championship game versus the Los Angeles Rams, Westoff appeared on Mike's On radio show with Mike Francesa of WFAN. On the program, he declared the result of that game as "the toughest loss of his long career".

=== Denver Broncos ===
Westhoff was hired to be the assistant head coach of the Denver Broncos under new head coach, Sean Payton, on February 25, 2023.

On November 12, 2024, Tom Pelissero of NFL Network reported Westhoff would step down from his position due to health problems related to his vision. Westhoff confirmed the report the next day, releasing a statement assuring fans that while he was okay, the incident was his body giving him a warning which he had to listen to. He concluded his message expressing gratitude for the outpouring of support from Broncos fans.

== Personal life ==
In 1988, Westhoff was diagnosed with cancer of the femur in his left leg. Originally, the condition was misdiagnosed and Westhoff was nearly fatally wounded after the doctor accidentally cut one of his arteries. Once the correct diagnosis was made Westhoff underwent ten surgeries to remove the cancer and the bone replacing it with bone grafts, plates, screws and pins. A cracked bone graft in 2007, caused Westhoff to announce his departure from the Jets. In 2008, Westhoff entered the Memorial Sloan-Kettering Cancer Center to undergo a procedure to replace the missing femur with a titanium rod. After vigorous rehabilitation, Westhoff was able to walk again and returned to the Jets' sidelines in September 2008.

Westhoff is a native of the Pittsburgh suburb of Bethel Park, Pennsylvania. Westhoff has a son, John.

== Bibliography ==
- Ryan, Rex; Don Yaeger (2011). Play Like You Mean It: Passion, Laughs, and Leadership In the World's Most Beautiful Game. New York, New York: Doubleday. ISBN 978-0-385-53444-4.
