= Phil Mushnick =

American sports columnist

- Born: May 15, 1952 (age 74); Staten Island, New York, U.S.
- Education: Waynesburg College
- Occupation: Sportswriter
- Writing career
- Period: 1971-present
- Subject: Sports

Phil Mushnick (born May 15, 1952) is a sports columnist for the New York Post. Over his career he has served as a beat reporter for the New York Cosmos, New Jersey Nets, and New York Rangers. Since 1982, he has been the Post’s sports television and radio columnist. Mushnick is known for his scathing commentary and columns.

== Career ==
Mushnick graduated from Waynesburg College in Pennsylvania with an English degree. In October 1973 he was hired as a copy boy for the New York Post before being promoted to writer.

In 1977 he began covering the New York Cosmos and their star player Pele.

According to the Post, he has a "no-holds-barred" style of commentary. Since 1982, he has been the newspaper's media columnist. His articles frequently focus on sports coverage on both television and radio, as well as social media. He has written about the changing media landscape, including the transition from local media to corporate conglomerates, sports leagues' moving games to various streaming services, the growing mainstream acceptance of gambling in sports, and the inability of fans to afford tickets to the biggest games.

He has attacked baseball players for their on-field actions including bat flips, celebrations, and the role he claims the media landscape has played in causing kids to adopt "showboating" practices that lead to an officials shortage in youth sports leagues.

While his columns usually feature a critique of some aspect of sports, he has also written articles that have taken the side of the fans in disputes with the major sports leagues; he has written articles sympathetic to fans forced to pay for a variety of streaming platforms to watch games.

He currently writes "Equal Time", a column that focuses on the relationship between sports and electronic media such as websites and social media.

=== Awards and honors ===
Mushnick has won the New York State Sportswriter of the Year award six times in his career, including 1999 and 2007.

== Feuds ==
A 1998 feature called Mushnick a "roving moralist" and "self-appointed watchdog." His work features a running theme that broadcasters should serve the event they are calling rather than themselves. Many of his targets (see below) have been called out repeatedly for violating this ethic.

=== Professional wrestling and its fans ===
Mushnick is a vehement, longtime detractor of the World Wrestling Federation (WWF/now WWE). He has criticized the lifestyles portrayed by its parent company Titan Sports, both in their storylines and the performers' personal lives. In 1997 he implied that Titan chairman Vince McMahon's perpetration of steroid use for his performers led to wrestler Brian Pillman's early demise. McMahon responded (on an episode of WWF Monday Night Raw) that Mushnick was a "self-righteous, egotistical, miserable son of a bitch." Mushnick then criticized the industry as a "death mill," citing several wrestlers who had died before the age of 45. Although the majority of the performers (including Miss Elizabeth and Davey Boy Smith) died after retiring from the WWF, Mushnick attributed their early deaths to their lifestyle while employed by Vince McMahon. Other media outlets have likewise provided statistics showing the high number of wrestlers who have died young from car crashes, suicide, homicide, heart failure and steroid-related health problems. On the October 13, 1997 episode of Monday Night Raw, manager Jim Cornette addressed Phil Mushnick's article referring to Brian Pillman's death by pointing out the crusade against wrestling, citing Mushnick's claim that rather than the WWF or WCW donating money they should stop business altogether, and the hatred he harbors towards wrestling fans and using the newspapers and magazines he writes for to attack those who watch wrestling.

=== Mike and the Mad Dog/Mike Francesa ===
The day after the September 11 attacks, Mushnick claimed that Mike and the Mad Dog had stated, on-air, that all Jewish Americans should take a loyalty oath to the United States. Mike Francesa denied ever making such comments, prompting further criticism from Mushnick. In April 2017, Deadspin reported that a recording of the show from September 12, 2001, had been located in the 9/11 archives of the Paley Center for Media. Deadspin writers listened to the episode, and noted that while Francesa and co-host Chris Russo had argued with an American citizen caller about his loyalty to Israel taking precedence over his loyalty to the United States, the broadcast was not "the Jew-bashing trainwreck" that Mushnick described.

Mushnick and Francesa have continued to wage their long-running public battle into 2022. At the root of Mushnick's dislike of Francesa is his perception of the latter's egotism, condescension, "know-it-all" attitude, and pomposity.

=== ESPN and Stephen A. Smith ===
Mushnick frequently criticizes the sports network ESPN. He has specifically labeled ESPN's ESPY Awards and their "Who's Now" segment in the summer of 2007 as "pathetic" self-promotions and accused it of ignoring second-tier sports in their highlights—such as the Arena Football League—until they are broadcast by ESPN. He often targets Stephen A. Smith, writing: "Could it be that Smith’s urban street-hip brotha yak—which he seems able to turn on and off with the drop of a Kangol—is supposed to appeal / pander to young, urban, street-talkin’ sports fans?—a description that was felt to have racist overtones.

=== Joe Morgan ===
Mushnick often singles out sports play by play announcers and color commentators when they commit factual errors or miscall a play. Particularly controversial was a July 2007 column ("Had Our Phil of Morgan") that criticized Major League Baseball Hall of Famer Joe Morgan, former color commentator for ESPN's Sunday Night Baseball, for inaccurately recalling a game he played in 1964. Soon thereafter "An Open Letter to Phil Mushnick and Other Critics of Mine" was posted on the Internet decrying Mushnick's interpretation, curiously positing that Morgan's mis-recollection was less important than his ability to enhance the game for the viewing audience. The controversy quelled when it was revealed the post originated from a website well known for parody.

=== Don Imus ===
Mushnick criticized WFAN's Don Imus for calling Mother Teresa "a no-good bitch" and for referring to sportscaster and former WFAN host Len Berman as "Lenny the Jew". When WFAN's parent, CBS Corporation, canceled Imus in the Morning after Imus made racist remarks about the Rutgers University women's basketball team, Mushnick wondered rhetorically why people were surprised by Imus' comment.

=== Jay-Z ===
On Friday, May 4, 2012, Mushnick made comments regarding rapper Jay-Z and his marketing in regard to the NBA's Brooklyn Nets. In the column Phil states, "As long as the Nets are allowing Jay-Z to call their marketing shots -- what a shock that he chose black and white as the new team colors to stress, as the Nets explained, their new "urban" home—why not have him apply the full Jay-Z treatment?" It wasn't until he added the next part which includes the N word that got the majority of people up in arms. "Why the Brooklyn Nets when they can be the New York N------s? The cheerleaders could be the Brooklyn B----hes or Hoes. Team logo? A 9 mm with hollow-tip shell casings strewn beneath. Wanna be Jay-Z hip? Then go all the way!"

Mushnick responded to the criticism to the popular sports and pop-culture website Bob's Blitz: "Such obvious, wishful and ignorant mischaracterizations of what I write are common. I don't call black men the N-word; I don't regard young women as bitches and whores; I don't glorify the use of assault weapons and drugs. Jay-Z, on the other hand.....Is he the only NBA owner allowed to call black men N---ers?

Jay-Z profits from the worst and most sustaining self-enslaving stereotypes of black-American culture and I'M the racist? Some truths, I guess, are just hard to read, let alone think about.

(Same column I provide support for Amar'e Stoudemire at a time when everyone in town is ripping him to shreds. That was my LEAD, too, but what does that matter?)"

=== Chance the Rapper ===
Mushnick went after White Sox ambassador Chancellor Bennett a.k.a. Chance the Rapper, citing the lyrics to Chance's song "Smoke Again" and labeling the Rapper as "a young man who publicly and professionally refers to black men as N—-s, and young women as easily discarded sexual junk." in an April 11 column. Mushnick rhetorically asked his readers if Chicago's mayor Rahm Emanuel, MLB Commissioner Rob Manfred, and Chicago's Reverend Jesse Jackson would publicly recite Chance's lyrics, presuming Chance to be a negative influence on the community.

=== Gary Sanchez ===
In August 2019, Mushnick wrote an article attacking the baseball IQ of New York Yankees catcher, Gary Sanchez. In the article titled "Gary Sanchez doesn’t know a thing about baseball", He attacks Sanchez for a mistake made on the basepaths in a previous game, and for his defensive effort. He received much criticism for this article over the Internet including from Sanchez's teammate Masahiro Tanaka on Twitter. In April 2021, he criticized Sanchez for using an interpreter during interviews, claiming that he was too lazy to learn English. There was significant pushback from the Yankees beat writers who pointed out that Sanchez does speak English but chooses to use an interpreter in interviews.

=== Ronald Acuna Jr. ===
In October 2019, Mushnick wrote an article titled "Braves' Ronald Acuna is Doing His Part in Ruining Baseball". In the piece, Mushnick blasted him for being "selfish" after he went into a home run trot on a ball that would end up hitting the wall. The article received criticism from members of the baseball media and baseball world.

=== John Sterling ===
Mushnick has written several columns critical of Yankees radio broadcaster John Sterling. He has referred to Sterling as "a narcissistic, condescending blowhard who neither knows nor cares what's happening on the field" and regularly accuses him of self-promotion.

=== Chris Berman ===
Mushnick has also taken aim at Chris Berman of ESPN over the years, viewing his "clown act" as forced, self-serving, and stale.

=== Stephen Jackson and Matt Barnes ===
In February 2020, Mushnick criticized Stephen Jackson and Matt Barnes, co-hosts of All the Smoke on Showtime. Mushnick attacked their maturity, character, and criticized their vernacular by stating that the co-hosts are "two of the worst, most uncivilized acts in recent NBA history, Stephen Jackson and Matt Barnes, were selected to co-host a show on Showtime that they load with backwards-pointed street vulgarities. "What’s the point? To prove that at 40 they still act like remorselessly indecent slugs?"

=== CC Sabathia Number Retirement ===
In February 2026, when the New York Yankees announced plans to retire CC Sabathia's number 52, Mushnick used his "Equal Time" column to criticize the team for "[watering down] their "standard for greatness". In response, Sabathia posted on X, "“Ah damn Phil sorry you feel that way…see you 9/26/26," with multiple laughing emojis.

== Personal life ==
Mushnick has been married to Deby since 1981.
