= Mike's On =

Mike's On: Francesa on the FAN
- Genre: Sports radio
- Running time: 6 p.m.–7 p.m., weekdays
- Home station: WFAN, WFAN-FM (2008–2017, 2018-2020)
- TV adaptations: Yes Network (2008–2014); Fox Sports 1/2 (2014–2015)
- Created by: Mike Francesa
- Original release: September 3, 2008 – December 15, 2017 (First run)

Mike's On: Francesa on the FAN was a sports radio talk show airing on New York City station WFAN, hosted by Mike Francesa. The show debuted on September 3, 2008, as the successor to Francesa's previous program, Mike and the Mad Dog, which was broadcast from 1989 to 2008 and made Francesa and his partner Chris Russo the first nationally known team in sports radio. When simulcast on television, Mike's On is broadcast under the title The Mike Francesa Show; it was simulcast on the YES Network from its inception until January 31, 2014. On March 24, 2014, Francesa signed an agreement to occasionally simulcast a portion of the show on Fox Sports 1 and Fox Sports 2. The arrangement with Fox Sports ended September 11, 2015 with Mike taking the blame for the project not succeeding. Francesa announced his retirement and the final show aired on December 15, 2017.

Mike's On returned to the airwaves on May 1, 2018, after what Francesa described as taking "some time off." On December 6, 2019, Francesa signed off his afternoon drive slot for the final time, transitioning to an expanded role on the Radio.com app and a half-hour daily show on WFAN. On Tuesday, May 26, 2020, Francesa's timeslot was expanded to 6pm-7pm, Weekdays on WFAN. On Thursday, July 23, 2020, Francesa announced that Friday July 24 would be his final show, and he once again retired the following day.

== Show format ==
The format of the show is similar to Mike and the Mad Dog with Francesa giving his opinions on the major sports stories of the day, as well as answering calls from listeners. Also, Francesa brings on guests from various sports ranging from head coaches/managers and players in the NFL, NBA, NHL, MLB and NCAA to broadcasters, and sportswriters from major newspapers across the country. The radio show includes sports updates every twenty minutes formerly provided by John Minko.

== Name ==
The show's previous name is Mike'd Up: Francesa on the FAN. Francesa had a TV show on WNBC entitled Mike'd Up: The Francesa Sports Final, and WFAN had to secure permission from WNBC to use the name Mike'd Up. On January 15, 2012, Francesa announced that the show could not reach an agreement with WNBC to continue to license the name Mike'd Up and changed its name to Mike's On: Francesa on the FAN.

== Broadcast times ==
When last broadcast the program aired from 6:00 to 7:00 p.m. on WFAN

== Theme Song ==
Mike's on.

He's ready to go.

On the FAN, New York Sports Radio.

Mike's on. Mike's on.

He'll get you the sports any way that he can.

It's Mike Francesa on the FAN.

Sports Radio 66, and 101.9 FM. W-F-A-N.

== Awards ==
In 2012, 2013 and 2014, Francesa was ranked number one among the 100 most important sports talk radio hosts in America by Talkers Magazine. Francesa credited colleagues at WFAN for his success with special salute to Russo. Francesa won the 2012 Marconi Award for Major Market Personality of the Year, which is his second since 2000. The announcement was made on September 20 at the 2012 National Association of Broadcasters Marconi Radio Awards Dinner and Show in Dallas, Texas.
