= John Minko =

American sports radio and television personality

John A. Minko (born January 31, 1953) is an American sports radio and television personality. He was a "20/20 sports anchor" on radio station WFAN in New York City and worked there from its inception in 1987 until 2020. Nicknamed "Coach" by his coworkers, Minko provided listeners with up-to-the-minute sports news, Sundays through Thursdays between 10 a.m. and 5 p.m. (Monday-Thursday) and 6 a.m. to 12 p.m. (Sunday). He has also been called the "Dean of Updates" in recognition of his seniority. On April 2, 2020, Minko announced that April 3 would be his last day on WFAN.

Minko has been a resident of New Milford, New Jersey.

== Broadcasting career ==
Minko appeared with the Mike's On: Francesa on the Fan crew, which succeeded Mike and the Mad Dog on the YES Network. He was often the subject of jokes by host Mike Francesa, including false accusations of criticizing other station members or boasting about personal achievements. He was also teased for his formal personality and reliance on scripted updates. Joe Benigno credited Minko with teaching him to read at a third-grade level.

From 2000 to 2009, Minko was the play-by-play announcer for Army football on WABC 770 and WEPN. In 2010, he co-hosted Army football's pre-game show. He also served as the update person for Francesa's nationally syndicated NFL Now show and has been a fill-in radio voice for the New Jersey Nets. Minko hosted a short-lived 1988 WFAN show, Minko Morning Zoo. His trademark calls include "Bingo!" and "He rings the bell." Minko is a graduate of Butler University.

Since November 11, 2008, he has been the radio play-by-play announcer for St. John's Red Storm college basketball.

Minko also co-hosts a weekly video blog called the Minko Minute with Evan Roberts. They usually talk about topics Minko chooses at first, then Evan asks Minko a love-related question. So far, these questions have only come from male viewers. Minko typically advises getting the woman flowers and chocolate or taking her to a Broadway show. Guest appearances have included Ian Eagle.
