= Pauline Sperry =

Mathematician

Pauline Sperry

Pauline Sperry (March 5, 1885 – September 24, 1967) was an American mathematician.

== Early life and education ==
Born in Peabody, Massachusetts, Sperry was the daughter of two schoolteachers; her father, William Gardner Sperry, was also a Congregational minister and later became president of Olivet College. Perry began her own undergraduate studies at Olivet College, but then moved to Smith College. She graduated from Smith in 1906 at age 21 and was elected to Phi Beta Kappa. After teaching at a private school, she returned to Smith in 1907 to do graduate work in mathematics and music, and earned a master's degree in music in 1908. She continued on as a teacher at Smith until 1912, remaining affiliated with Smith as a traveling fellow into 1913.

Sperry began studying at the University of Chicago in 1913 and earned a master's degree in mathematics in 1914. Under the guidance of Ernest Julius Wilczynski, her doctoral thesis, "Properties of a certain projectively defined two-parameter family of curves on a general surface", drew on his work as the founder of the American school of projective differential geometry. She earned her PhD in mathematics and astronomy in 1916 and was elected to the Sigma Xi honor society.

== Later career ==
After a year teaching again at Smith, Sperry spent the rest of her academic career at the University of California at Berkeley, beginning in 1917. When she was promoted to assistant professor in 1923, she became the first female tenure-track mathematics faculty member at the university. Her students at Berkeley included Raymundo Favila. At the height of McCarthyism, the Board of Regents required university employees to sign a loyalty oath. Sperry, Hans Lewy, and others who refused were barred from teaching without pay in 1950. In the case Tolman v. Underhill, the California Supreme Court ruled in 1952 the loyalty oath unconstitutional and reinstated those who refused to sign. Sperry was reinstated with the title emeritus associate professor and later awarded back pay.

== Personal life ==
Sperry was an active Quaker and involved in various humanitarian and political causes.
