= Raymundo Favila =

Raymundo Acosta Favila was a Filipino mathematician. He has his Ph.D. from the University of California, Berkeley from 1939 under the supervision of Pauline Sperry, and had his career at the University of the Philippines in Manila. Dr. Raymundo Favila was elected as Academician of the National Academy of Science and Technology in 1979. He was one of those who initiated mathematics in the Philippines. He contributed extensively to the progression of mathematics and the mathematics learning in the country. He has made fundamental studies such as on stratifiable congruences and geometric inequalities. Dr. Favila has also co-authored textbooks in algebra and trigonometry.

Dissertation: On the Projective Differential Geometry of Certain Systems of Linear Homogeneous Partial Differential Equations of the First Order, with Special Applications
