= Mike and the Mad Dog =

American sports talk radio program

- Other names: Mike'd Up
- Genre: Sports talk
- Running time: 5 hours, 30 minutes (1:00–6:30 p.m. ET)
- Country of origin: United States
- Language: English
- Home station: WFAN
- TV adaptations: YES Network (2002–2008)
- Starring: Mike Francesa; Chris Russo
- Original release: September 5, 1989 – August 15, 2008

Mike and the Mad Dog is an American sports radio show hosted by Mike Francesa and Christopher "Mad Dog" Russo that aired in afternoons on WFAN in New York City from September 1989 to August 2008. From 2002 the show was simulcast on television on the YES Network. On the radio, the show was simulcast beginning in 2007 on WQYK in Tampa, Florida, and from 2004 until 2007 on WROW in Albany, New York. The popularity of Mike and the Mad Dog, along with other sports talk shows on WFAN, is credited with helping to popularize the sports radio format across the United States.

== History ==
=== Before Mike and the Mad Dog ===
Before Francesa and Russo were paired, Russo was an overnight/weekend and fill-in host. He caught the attention of Don Imus, who was impressed with his vibrant personality and brought Russo onto the Imus in the Morning show as its sports reporter.

Meanwhile, Francesa was a midday and weekend host at WFAN, and was known to be knowledgeable but somewhat dry on-air. Like Russo, Francesa got the attention of Imus when he made an on-the-air bet with Francesa that Seton Hall University's basketball team would not make the Final Four in the NCAA tournament. Imus promised Francesa a new Porsche if Seton Hall made the Final Four, which they did. Though Imus found a way around the bet, the dialogue between the two is considered to be among the classic moments in the history of Imus in the Morning.

=== Paired together ===
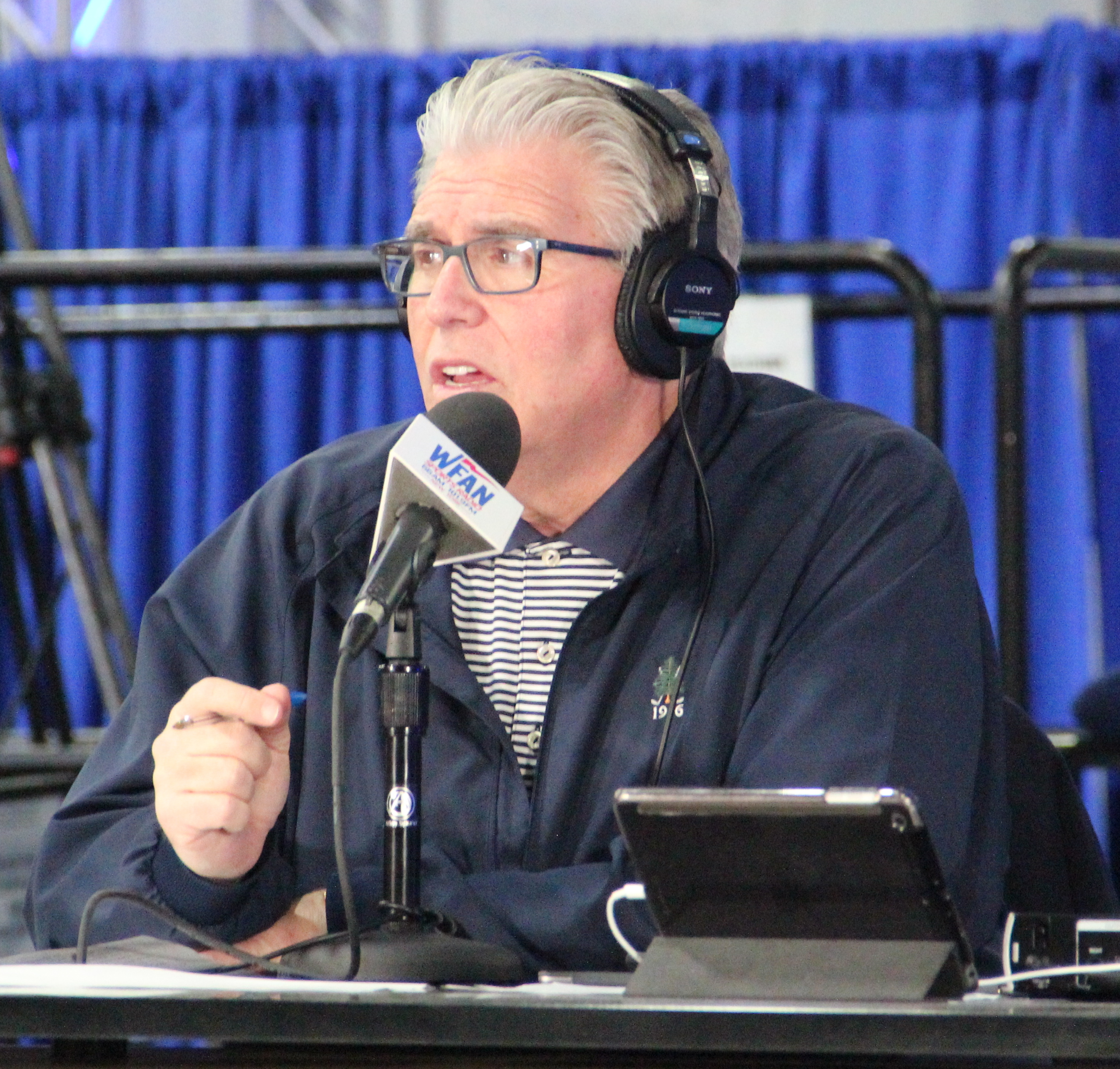
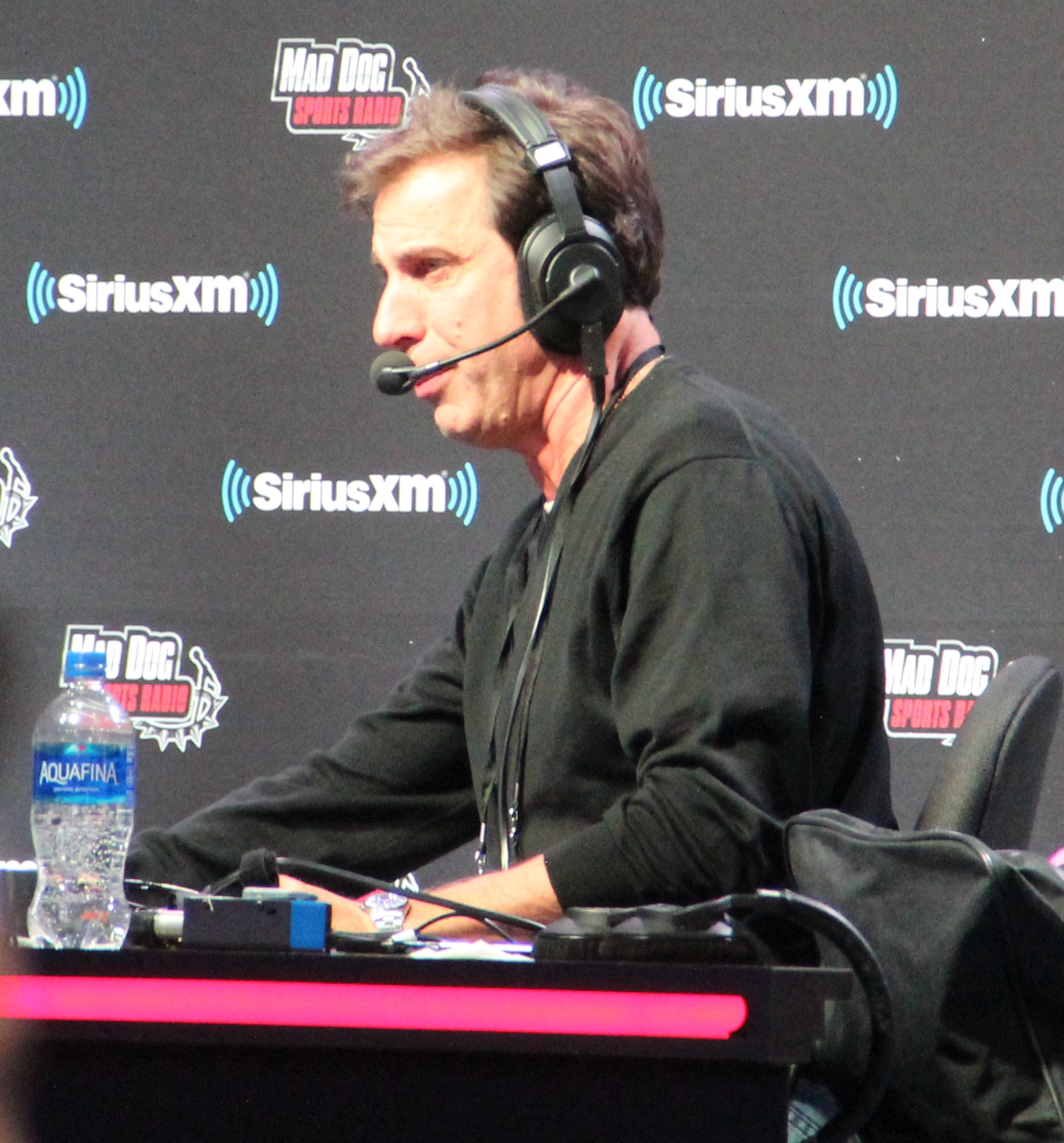
Hosts Mike Francesa and Chris Russo in 2019

In August 1989, WFAN (which was owned at the time by Emmis Communications) was looking for hosts to replace the controversial Pete Franklin in the afternoon drive time period. Mark Mason, then the program director, floated the idea of teaming Francesa with Russo. At first, the station management thought the idea was crazy because they were no-names at that time. However, because of Francesa and Russo's popularity on the weekends and on Imus in the Morning individually, the station management decided to pair the two together. The show was dubbed Mike and the Mad Dog and debuted on September 5, 1989. However, the decision to pair them on an afternoon show was a surprise to the two men, and a risk. Things were rocky at first. According to Francesa:

“We had a tough beginning. It was a shotgun marriage. We didn't get along very well, and we were kind of thrown together. Although, I think the thing that changed everything was how quickly the ratings were off the charts. By spring, nine months into the show, we were No. 1 — and No. 1 in a big way — and we realized that no matter what we did, we weren't going to get away from each other.”

While Francesa's brand of sports commentating was considered hard-hitting and serious, Russo's was considered lighter, unconventional, and more entertaining. Regarding the prior perception, Russo said,

"I’ve always said it: Mike is a lot funnier, and a lot wittier, than people thought. And Chris was a lot more knowledgeable and sharp, sports-wise, than people thought. So I think that combination, at times, got a little overrated—that Mike was the encyclopedic one, and Dog was the goofy one. Which I think that was the perception for a long time. After a while, they realized, hey, Mike’s funny! And Dog knows what he’s talking about! Once that was established, I think the show was sharp."

The show became a staple of the New York sports scene. Francesa says, "We always brought that intensity, that bravado, that fierce individual personality to our show, and that's what I thought made it so good."

George Vecsey of The New York Times once described Russo's voice as "a bizarre mixture of Jerry Lewis, Archie Bunker and Daffy Duck." His voice has also been described as "Donald Duck on steroids."

Both Francesa and Russo credited Imus for making the pairing possible. Russo said, "Imus was very, very, very, very important to the development of FAN... He solved a lot of problems for the company." Francesa said, "Without Imus, there's no Mike and the Mad Dog, there's no FAN, and I'm telling you, there's no format... Dog and I came through the toughest school there is: the Imus school of radio."

=== Broadcast times ===
Originally it was broadcast weekdays from 3:00 to 7:00 p.m. Eastern Time. Because of its popularity, WFAN extended its starting time twice, first to 2:00 p.m., and then to 1:00 p.m. At the end of its run, the program aired from 1:00 to 6:30 p.m. on WFAN, WQYK in Florida, and YES Network.

=== Mike and the Mad Dog in the morning ===
In the wake of Imus' firing in April 2007, Mike and the Mad Dog was also broadcast in the mornings from 6:00 to 10:00 a.m. for two weeks between April 16 and April 27, and again on May 21 and May 22, 2007. The afternoon portion of the show ran from 2:00 through 6:30 p.m. The morning portion of the show was nationally syndicated and news-oriented. While in the morning drive slot, they inherited some of the staff from Imus in the Morning, including news anchor Charles McCord, sports anchor Chris Carlin and engineer Lou Rufino. The syndicated broadcast was available to the handful of former Imus in the Morning affiliates who had not had a chance to pick a new morning show. Francesa and Russo hosted the morning drive program several more times, either together or taking turns solo, until Boomer Esiason and Craig Carton took over the timeslot with their show on September 4, 2007.

=== End of the run ===
On June 22, 2008, sports columnist Neil Best of Newsday reported that Francesa and Russo were considering ending their radio show. The reports stated that the relationship between the radio duo had soured during Spring 2008, and was the likely cause of the split. Although Russo's contract with WFAN ran until October 2009, Francesa's contract situation was unclear at that time. Newsday contacted Francesa on vacation, where he stated "no comment". On June 23, Russo, doing the show alone, denied the rumors. He said that he and Francesa had been "fighting like cats and dogs" until early May, but that their relationship had since improved. "Nineteen, 20 years, you're going to have your issues occasionally", he said. "You gotta get through those issues." Some fans have suggested that the rumors were created as a contract negotiation ploy or a publicity stunt. On June 27, 2008, Francesa acknowledged the show was at a "crossroad", and could not guarantee the show would last through the summer. Francesa also stated he and Russo had not spoken since reports of their possible breakup came out.

On July 11, 2008, Francesa and Russo reunited for their first show together since news of their possible breakup came out. They did their show from the Jacob K. Javits Convention Center for the DHL All-Star Fan Fest. They would do three more shows together around All-Star weekend. Both Francesa and Russo were coy about their future beyond the summer. On August 5, 2008, they would do their final show together at the New York Giants' training facility in Albany, New York.

On August 14, 2008, Russo reached a mutual agreement with WFAN to let him out of the remainder of his contract. Russo insisted it was solely a personal decision and said, "This has nothing to do with Mike and I hating each other... This is about doing something different. I'm 48 years old and there are not going to be too many more opportunities to break away. It's time to try something else, but it was a tough decision to make." On August 15, 2008, Russo phoned Francesa on the show to say goodbye. A highly emotional Russo began to break down on air as he talked about his partnership with Francesa.

=== Separate ways ===
At the same time, while Russo left WFAN, Francesa signed a five-year deal to stay at WFAN and continue to host the afternoon drive-time show called Mike'd Up: Francesa on the FAN. On August 19, 2008, Russo signed a five-year contract worth about $3 million per year with SiriusXM to host an afternoon show called Mad Dog Unleashed and headline a new sports talk channel called Mad Dog Radio on both Sirius and XM satellite radio. Russo said there was nothing WFAN could have done to keep him after Sirius XM provided him an opportunity to not only do a show, but have his own channel, which he could not pass up.

=== Reflections ===
In an interview with Best on November 19, 2008, Francesa insisted that there was no smoking gun, no juicy, untold key regarding the breakup with Russo. However, Francesa believed a contributing factor was a fallout from Imus' firing in April 2007 because Russo wanted to pursue the morning slot alone, but the WFAN management was hesitant to break up the pairing. Francesa sensed that Russo was disappointed.

Francesa said, "In retrospect, I think it set us off on a bad path that last year. I don't mean that caused Dog to leave. He left because he had an opportunity ... But we had a very rocky last year. I think what might have caused some of that was his feeling, stronger than I knew at the time, that he wanted to go to mornings more than I did."

In reflection, Francesa said, "We had 20 years of something that was great. We're linked forever. That's just life. So the idea that people want to paint Mike vs. Mad Dog, who's the good guy, who's the bad guy? You know what? There is no bad guy."

In another interview with Jerry Barmash on June 29, 2012, regarding Russo leaving the show, Francesa said, "I didn’t begrudge him leaving for one second. I never had an issue with that. It just wasn’t handled properly, which I think he now understands it and would readily admit."

Francesa said he and WFAN operations manager Mark Chernoff got word through back channels of Russo's plan three months before it was made public. But Russo kept quiet until the end. Russo declined to be interviewed.

In an interview with Bob Raissman on June 30, 2012, Russo said that the decision to part ways with Francesa was the biggest one of his life, which was made by himself. He still asked, "You think I did the right thing?"

Russo said, "It's almost like in the last four years, it's almost like I’ve forgotten I was at FAN for so long. This (Sirius/XM's Mad Dog Radio) is a different kind of element, a different kind of show. It's all-consuming. It's so different than what I was used to", Russo said. "You forget what you accomplished in that 20-year period. It's almost like I forget I was at FAN for 20 years."

In the same interview with Raissman, Russo did not rule out a reunion with Francesa. Russo said, "You never want to say never. You know how the radio business is. So, you never say never, but I haven’t thought about it in my crystal ball, let's put it that way... But I’ll tell you right now, if Mike and I did shows together we would have no trouble picking right up where we left off."

In the Rolling Stone interview on July 13, 2017, Francesa said, "We were two individuals who, in our core, always thought we could be enormously successful without the other one... People feel very personal about the radio people they listen to. You become a part of their life... I've had guys come up to me on the street and say, 'I didn't have a dad, you raised me.'"

Francesa came back from his 2017 retirement after 4 months to begin hosting afternoon drive on WFAN, which he did until December 2019. The un-retirement was criticized by Russo, reflecting after Francesa's second retirement announcement that he never should have returned, calling his decision "unhealthy" and revealing that the two had not spoke outside of aired reunions for almost a decade. In response to the criticism, Francesa mocked Russo's career, saying that “Dog spent a lot of time opining on my career in the last 10 years; I’ve never once given an opinion about his — not once. It’s something he spends a lot of time doing”.

=== On-air reunions ===
On the eve of Russo's 50th birthday, Francesa made a surprise appearance on Mad Dog Unleashed on October 15, 2009. The following day, Francesa and Russo teamed up for a one-hour reunion show on Mike'd Up: Francesa on the FAN at 1 p.m. and then again on Mad Dog Unleashed from 6:30 to 7:00 p.m. at Yankee Stadium before the first game of the 2009 American League Championship Series, where both were broadcasting their separate shows in adjacent booths. Russo said that although he loved working at Sirius, he missed talking sports with Francesa.

On January 31, 2012, Francesa and Russo met on the air at the Radio Row at Super Bowl XLVI. Russo was standing near the WFAN table at around 1:40 p.m. when Francesa invited him to come on. Francesa then went on Russo's show at 6:30 p.m.

On June 29, 2012, Francesa had Russo on the air for a segment to finish off a celebratory week in honor of the 25th anniversary of WFAN.

On December 3, 2015, Francesa and Russo had their radio shows simulcast on both WFAN and SiriusXM Satellite Radio for a commercial-free 40 minutes. During the simulcast, they announced that Mike and the Mad Dog would reunite for a one-time-only fundraising show at Radio City Music Hall on March 30, 2016. The proceeds would go to the Garden of Dreams Foundation, which benefits programs and charities that help children facing various obstacles, including physical and financial.

On January 12, 2016, Francesa announced that the March 30 reunion show would be simulcast on MSG+ TV, WFAN and SiriusXM.

On March 30, 2016 – Francesa and Russo hosted the reunion show at Radio City Music Hall. Among the highlights:

- Guests: Tom Coughlin, Joe Torre, Mark Messier, Bobby Valentine and Jeff Van Gundy in the show appearance order.
- Francesa and Russo mentioned that the two went two and a half months on-air together without ever otherwise talking to each other due to when Russo wanted to go to Indiana to do a show onsite for a Knicks-Pacers series during the 2000 NBA Playoffs, but Francesa did not. Their first flight got canceled, and instead of waiting for another one that would have had a layover in DC, Francesa declined to go. The standoff ended when Francesa's wife Roe invited Russo to Francesa's wedding.
- When answering an audience member's question of whether Francesa and Russo would ever regularly do a radio show together again, Francesa said, "Never say never."

On June 24, 2016, Francesa and Russo had their radio shows simulcast on both WFAN and SiriusXM Satellite Radio for half an hour (beginning at 4 p.m. ET) to promote their candidacy for induction into the National Radio Hall of Fame.

On February 2, 2017, Francesa and Russo met on the air at the Radio Row at Super Bowl LI for 45 commercial-free minutes from Russo's SiriusXM set.

On July 6, 2017, Francesa and Russo attended the SiriusXM Town Hall meeting moderated by actor Chazz Palminteri, a week before a 30 for 30 documentary on Francesa and Russo went on the air. Regarding the possibility of reunions, Francesa says, "“first, someone has to make an offer, which no one has yet. But if something comes up, I’ll always listen.” And Russo says, "I think we both know we could easily do shows together. I think it would be sporadic — maybe one day a week, maybe something around big events."

On November 15, 2017, Russo joined Francesa on Francesa's farewell-to-WFAN tour with an event in his honor dubbed “A Night to Remember” at the Tilles Center on the campus of LIU Post broadcast on WFAN.

On December 14, 2017, Russo joined Francesa on Francesa's penultimate show at Paley Center in New York on WFAN to say farewell to Francesa.

On March 28, 2018, Francesa joined Russo on Russo's show High Heat on MLB Network for an hour.

On January 19, 2023, it was announced that Francesa would be joining Russo and Stephen A. Smith on the February 1st broadcast of ESPN's First Take.

=== Ratings and salaries ===
Mike and the Mad Dog was No. 1 in the market among men between 25 and 54, which notched a 6.9 share in 2007, up from a 6.2 in 2006. The show was very lucrative for WFAN, which sold up to 18 minutes of advertisements each hour. According to New York magazine, Francesa made $1.4 million and Russo made $1.3 million in 2005. Each host's contracts expired at different times, making it difficult for the station to comply with each's demand to be paid as much as the other.

== Show format and discussions ==
The show started with its theme song and then with Russo's intro.

The show involved Francesa and Russo talking and arguing with each other or with callers about sports, and occasionally non-sports topics. They were also known for their hard-hitting questions in interviews with their guests. Francesa was the more cerebral of the pair and Russo would defer to him in most arguments. Russo was known to make bold statements when hosting the show solo but would back down when Francesa was co-hosting. Nevertheless, Russo also exhibited a vast knowledge of sports. One of the show's marketing pitches stated: "Some shows report sports scores. We settle them."

The pair sometimes left their Astoria, Queens studios to do remote broadcasts from the Super Bowl, pre-season football camps, U.S. Open Tennis Championship (typically Russo hosted these show solo because Francesa is not a tennis fan; see below), the Yankees and Mets' spring training sites, and playoff games for various New York teams.

The Mike and the Mad Dog show primarily concentrated on baseball and football. In an interview with the New York Daily News, Francesa said:

"As far as changes in the city, baseball has now become year-round. We cover baseball every single day of the year...just look at the back pages in November, December, they have screaming baseball headlines. Baseball has become so dominant in what we do."

Basketball and golf were covered to a much lesser extent, but they did receive mention due to the show's strong relationship with Jim Nantz, an acclaimed golf and college basketball broadcaster, plus a few noted college coaches and NBA coaches, reporters, and broadcasters. It is well noted that Russo is a big fan of tennis; and tennis did get some play on their show (much to Francesa's chagrin) generally leading into and then during the four majors. Francesa is an admirer of horse racing, and the program devoted time to racing talk during the Triple Crown season, the summer meet at Saratoga Race Course in upstate New York, and the Breeders' Cup.

International sporting events such as the Tour de France got little mention except when there was a scheduled interview or major story. Both Russo and Francesa have admitted to not being experts in hockey, but playoff games involving the local teams were discussed and noted NHL guests sometimes appeared. Boxing was not talked about much, as both hosts consider the sport not to be what it once was. Although Freddy Adu and a few other soccer celebrities did interviews on the show, the FIFA World Cup and the sport itself received little to no attention on the program; the local MLS team, the New York Red Bulls, were rarely mentioned at all. (Russo said in his first book that he played soccer as a teenager, but was not a big fan of the game.)

== Incidents and controversies ==
While the Mike and the Mad Dog program has been a success, the duo has had their share of problems. Things did not go well at first. Neither of them was happy about the arrangement, and each felt that he deserved his own show. Arguments between the two have spilled onto the air and there were backstage debates about such matters as whose name would come first and which of them would get the power seat—the one facing the control room. Each had an entourage of advisers and friends who pushed him to ask for more. Sometimes Don Imus needled them on his program or walked by them in the hall and said, "You are so much better than [the other guy]." However, Imus did play peacemaker during several of the more public fights.

Regarding the relationship between Francesa and Russo, Francesa said, "It was an arranged marriage and almost a quickie divorce." Russo admitted that such a proposition of breaking up between the two would have been celebrated in 1992. However, Russo said in an interview, "I think that, in the long term, the station sees us as a tandem and would not want to break the brand up... And to tell you the truth, after almost 20 years together, Mike and I are like a married couple: It would be too hard to leave him. I never thought I would hear myself say this, but it would feel very strange to be on the air without him."

However, their relationship got strained again in March 2008. It was reported that Francesa and Russo were considering ending their radio show. Russo admitted that from the end of March through the beginning of May, "Mike and I were having a lot of issues. If you're a listener, I don't have to tell you . . . We were fighting like cats and dogs. The tolerance level of each other, Mike to me, me to Mike, was low." But Russo insisted their relationship had improved. Francesa agreed that this was among the worst of their "four or five" fights over the years.

=== 1991 NCAA Tournament ===
In 1991, while Francesa was still at CBS Sports hosting the 1991 NCAA tournament—Russo was very critical of CBS's coverage. The discussion began to gain momentum and soon snowballed over a number of days. CBS was unhappy that Francesa's show was being used as a platform for criticisms of their television coverage, prompting a call from Francesa asking Russo to not discuss the topic. Russo refused and an on-the-air argument followed. Francesa would eventually leave CBS Sports and concentrate on his radio career full-time.

=== Phil Mushnick accusations ===
The day after the September 11 attacks, sportswriter Phil Mushnick claimed that the duo had stated, on-air, that all Jewish Americans should take a loyalty oath to the United States. Francesa denied ever making such comments, prompting further criticism from Mushnick. In April 2017, Deadspin reported that a recording of the show from September 12, 2001, had been located in the 9/11 archives of the Paley Center for Media. Deadspin writers listened to the episode, and noted that while Francesa and Russo had argued with an American citizen caller about his loyalty to Israel taking precedence over his loyalty to the United States, the broadcast was not "the Jew-bashing trainwreck that New York Post columnist Phil Mushnick described." A 30 for 30 episode about Mike & the Mad Dog including a section on the 9/11 incident, which came across as fairly tense but not angry and was over quickly; commentators on the show noted that Francesa and Russo sometimes covered areas they didn't really have any background knowledge about.

=== Hockey ===
On the flip side, the duo have always defended each other in the face of adversity. Francesa and Russo have garnered a reputation for not being knowledgeable when it comes to hockey, though Russo later claimed in his first book that he has watched some regular-season NHL games that many hockey writers would be hard-pressed to. Also, long-time NHL television analysts John Davidson and Pierre McGuire had both been semi-regular guests on the show, and Ed Olczyk had made several appearances since joining NBC. In May 1992, Russo went to a New York Rangers game against the Pittsburgh Penguins. When Russo arrived at the game, Rangers fans chided him and he eventually left the game. The next day, Francesa went on the air and blasted the Rangers fans for their behavior. They also allegedly had an on-air spat with long-time hockey writer and broadcaster Stan Fischler, who never did another interview on their show. In 2006, Jaromir Jagr jokingly made fun of their hockey knowledge, to which the duo said that he had sold them on watching more.

=== "ONE TIME!!" ===
The Monday after Russo's favorite baseball team, the San Francisco Giants, were eliminated from the 2003 postseason by the Florida Marlins he went into his most famous tirade.

Think about this for a second, if you're a Giant fan. Just put yourself in my shoes. The Florida Marlins have been in existence for ten years. They have done nothing. They had one great year in '97, and now, they're having this magical run again, and both times at the expense of the Giants. Think about that for a second. I have been around for 50 years, not a thing. Twice, this team, out of nowhere, has knocked us off. I'll give you one other stat: You know, the Giants have played four postseason games in Joe Robbie Stadium in the last six years, and they've lost every game in the last at-bat. Every freakin' game, in that stupid ballpark, they've lost in the last at. ... I've got Ernie Kashonas callin' me up and going crazy, Marlin this, Marlin that, Marlin fans are nowhere to be found, and now I can't win a game in that park in front of 65,000 people. I tell you, Saturday, I was so upset. And I thought I was beyond it. I thought it wouldn't bother me. Saturday, I was mad at Rodríguez, I was mad at J.T. Sn(ow). ... Well, I wasn't mad at J.T., but I was mad at Rodriguez ... (Giants pitcher) Jerome Williams, I was mad at everybody. I cannot believe ... and then I got the Yankees, walkin' through the park in Minnesota, pounding the Twinks, Mariano pitching great, Clemens and Wells, who I hate, going out there and being great, now I gotta deal with the Yankees winning another World Championship, probably, beating the Red Sox and Cubs along the way, and I'm out in the first round. I mean, why waste my TIME?!? Every single freaking year, I get myself juiced up for this stupid team, and at 43 years of age with three kids, enough already! Let them go hurt somebody else. I mean, when am I ever going to have a chance to win a lousy freaking championship? ONE TIME! NOT TWENTY! ONE LOUSY GODDAMN TIME! Gee whiz! Every single ... beep that "GD". ... Every single time. Ah, come on, will ya please? Can you beat the Florida Marlins one time? Four straight losses in that ballpark. Not to mention Busch Stadium in '87. Not to mention '93, 12–1 (a loss to the Los Angeles Dodgers on the final day of the season, allowing the Braves to finish one game ahead). Last year, they spit it up! Every single time. The game in Wrigley Field. Nobody beats the Cubs; we can't beat them in '98. Nobody beats 'em, we stink. The Mets! The lousy Mets did it to us! Gosh, every time! I never win. Every year, I'm sitting there—and I'll be there on October 26—and they'll beat Dusty to annoy me—I'll be there October 26 and the Yankees will be parading down the Canyon of Heroes with their 27th championship, and I'm out again. I mean, I don't care how many books I write, how many kids I have, how many Marconis. I don't care! Mike can put me on that show forever—I DON'T CARE! WIN ONE! I'll give it all back! I'll leave now! One, that's all I want is one—UNO! I'll leave, I swear I'll leave! I'll quit! Mushnick (A sports columnist for the New York Post) can be happy. I'll leave one time! Once! I'll get out of here forever, you'll never see me again. Let me win once. ONCE! I'm getting at 43 years of age. I'm not getting any younger. I'm not as old as Mike, but I'm not getting any younger!

Russo got progressively more and more worked up as his rant continued, to the point where his voice was straining and cracking at the end. His wish eventually came true when the Giants won the 2010 World Series. Since then, San Francisco has won the World Series twice more, in 2012 and 2014.

=== Doggie going solo: ____ and the Mad Dog ===
In the summer of 1992, while Francesa was on vacation at the Breakers, in Palm Beach, Florida, Russo jokingly started the show by saying, "Welcome to....and the Mad Dog", leaving silence where the "Mike" should have been. Francesa was furious, calling several station bigwigs and demanding an apology. On another occasion, Francesa returned from a vacation a day early, hoping to rejoin Russo on the air; Russo, savoring the solo airtime, accused Francesa of trying to horn in on his time. There was a great deal of shouting, and during a closed-door cool-down meeting with WFAN executives they nearly started throwing punches.

=== Flight cancellation during 2000 NBA Eastern Conference Finals ===
On May 30, 2000, after the New York Knicks beat the Indiana Pacers on Game 4 of the 2000 NBA Eastern Conference Finals, Francesa and Russo intended to board a plane to Indianapolis to host Mike and the Mad Dog there. However, the flight got cancelled and the next flight did not have first class seats available. Since Francesa only rode planes with first class seats, he walked away from the airport and went to the studio. This angered Russo and later that day Russo exploded during a close-door meeting with management. According to Russo, that was their worst fight ever. The duo didn't talk, or even look at each other, during commercial breaks for 2 1/2 months. Francesa said he went on vacation in the summer of 2000 and told WFAN to figure something out because he refused to work with Russo again when he returned.

Without Francesa's knowledge, Francesa's wife Roe sent a wedding invitation to Russo. Francesa said, "that was what thawed out the relationship. She saved the relationship... There would have been no Mike and the Mad Dog after 2000 if that had not happened. It’s a true story."

=== "Enter Sandman" ===
When New York Yankees closer Mariano Rivera would enter a game, his entrance song was "Enter Sandman" by Metallica. Rivera's onetime New York Mets counterpart, Billy Wagner, also used "Enter Sandman" as his entrance music. After Wagner entered one of his first games as a Met – at Shea Stadium against the Washington Nationals on April 5, 2006 – and used "Enter Sandman" as his entrance music, Francesa, an avid Yankees fan, expressed his anger and discontent, and strongly suggested that Wagner change the song. His argument was that the song belonged to Rivera and Yankee Stadium, and that Wagner was "stealing" the song and should be forbidden from using it and needed to get some originality. However, Rivera was not bothered by it. After seeing plenty of backlash, Francesa and Russo later tried to downplay it as a "tongue in cheek" thing that was never serious. However, Phil Mushnick of the New York Post blasted the two for having "made complete fools of themselves" and for trying to "rewrite unforgettable history to have their audience think that they were just kidding around."

=== Cory Lidle ===
On October 9, 2006, after the sudden exit of the Yankees from the divisional series, Francesa and Russo took many grievances with so called Yankee dissenters, feeling most strongly about alleged comments made by Yankee starter Cory Lidle. Lidle was lambasted on air about comments that were seemingly directed towards Yankees manager Joe Torre. Lidle called into the station, and a 13-minute heated discussion ensued where Francesa and Russo challenged Lidle's credibility over these unofficial statements made to the media.

On October 11, 2006, Lidle and his flight instructor crashed a small plane into a 50-story condominium tower on Manhattan's Upper East Side. Francesa and Russo quickly went on the defensive, as they were emotionally disturbed and upset by the death of Lidle, whom they had scolded on air two days prior. They also refused to take any phone calls for the first couple of days after the crash, which led many to speculate that they were afraid of what their callers would say. In fact, many of the other hosts during their shows received quite a number of phone calls lambasting Francesa and Russo.

After the crash, Francesa said,

"If I knew he had two days to live, I would've told him to enjoy himself. ... But you can't do interviews that way. No one in the world thinks that way. ... And then to think my last words to him were that I don't think about him very much. You just weigh it very differently now."

In a separate interview, Francesa said,

"You're not going to make me feel guilty. There have been times when we've been rude, I'd be crazy not to admit that. ... But this was an interview we never thought twice about."

Russo said to New York Daily News media columnist Bob Raissman,

"Do I wish right this second I had a better relationship with Cory Lidle? Yeah, I absolutely do, (but) you got to do what you got to do. I don't know what to tell you. You can make the argument that I look like a heel. ... I've been ripping him for five or six months. Does that make me a bad guy? I'll let others evaluate that."

=== Stance on the Imus–Rutgers controversy ===
Francesa and Russo opened their show on April 10, 2007, by weighing in on the controversy involving Don Imus and the disparaging comments he made the previous Wednesday about the Rutgers University women's basketball team. The program began with an airing of statements delivered by team coach C. Vivian Stringer and team captain Essence Carson at a news conference held two hours prior. Mike followed with a monologue, in which he flatly denied rumors of a gag order in effect at WFAN, and confirmed that the decision to air portions of the Rutgers news conference at the top of the show had been made in consultation with program director Mark Chernoff. Francesa went on to clarify that while he had spoken with Imus a few days after the incident in question, his discussions with Imus had no bearing on how he reported the matter on Mike and the Mad Dog.

Picking up from Francesa's opening monologue, Russo criticized Imus for failing to submit a public apology within 48 hours of making the offending comments, and found fault with his strategy on both Al Sharpton's radio show and The Today Show of citing his personal accomplishments in raising money for charitable causes like sickle-cell anemia, children's cancer and the plight of wounded veterans of the Iraq War. In Russo's estimation, this stance was "defensive." Russo suggested that Imus should have focused on atoning for his comments, rather than on burnishing his record of charitable activism.

Both Francesa and Russo were in agreement that Imus, in Francesa's words, "went too far" in his characterization of the Rutgers women's basketball team. They also agreed with a caller that the statements made by Imus were both "racist and sexist." In their opening comments, they pointed out that Imus had made countless remarks during his nearly thirty-five years on the radio that could be perceived as offensive; Russo cited the specific example of Bernard McGuirk's running parody of then-New York Catholic Archbishop Cardinal Edward Egan (and prior to this, Egan's predecessor Cardinal John Joseph O'Connor), speculating that many Catholic listeners may have found this gag offensive.

Despite these criticisms, however, both Francesa and Russo balked at the idea that Imus should be fired as host of his nationally syndicated radio program Imus in the Morning. They disagreed, too, that the then proposed two-week suspension was merely, as one journalist had characterized it, "a slap on the wrist."

On April 12, 2007, Francesa announced in the afternoon that Don Imus had been dismissed by CBS Radio, the parent company of WFAN. This dismissal came on the heels of the permanent cancellation of Imus's telecast on MSNBC the previous day.

Both Francesa and Russo criticized both MSNBC and CBS Radio for dismissing Imus in the middle of the annual WFAN radiothon, which supports three prominent children's charities (the Tomorrows Children's Fund, the CJ Foundation for S.I.D.S. and the Imus Ranch). Since Imus was scheduled to host the radiothon the following morning, the immediate dismissal created a serious scheduling complication. Initially, Francesa reported that both he and Russo would host the radiothon in lieu of Imus; however, this plan was soon amended to allow Imus' wife Deidre Imus, and Charles McCord to host instead. For the next two weeks, Francesa and Russo filled in the morning slot.

When the morning portion of Mike and the Mad Dog debuted on April 16, Francesa opened the show by saying, "We would hope someone would come to their senses and Don would come back in a couple of weeks...We're not saying that's going to happen. We would hope something like that would happen." Later on both Francesa and Russo blasted Tim Russert (No. 1 on the list anointed by Russo), Mike Wallace, Christopher Dodd ("The biggest phony" by Russo), Keith Olbermann, Harold Ford, Jr., etc. for not supporting Imus.

== Notable moments ==
=== Marconi Award ===
Francesa and Russo won the 2000 Marconi Award for Major Market Personality of the Year. The announcement was made on September 23 at the 2000 National Association of Broadcasters Marconi Radio Awards Dinner and Show in San Francisco, California. They were the first sports-talk hosts ever to win the award.

=== Fifteenth anniversary ===
On December 15, 2004, Francesa and Russo celebrated their fifteenth anniversary on the air from 2 to 7 p.m. This anniversary special was preceded by a special preshow from 1 to 2 p.m. featuring highlights of the past 15 years of Mike and the Mad Dog.

=== Twenty-five-hour broadcast ===
Between June 30, 2005, and July 1, 2005, Francesa and Russo broadcast live for 25 straight hours for the first time ever to raise money for various charities. It started after the completion of the New York Mets game (approximately 5 p.m.) and continued through the next day at 6:30 p.m. The show was broadcast from the Summer Garden at Rockefeller Center in New York City. Notable guests included Tiki Barber and Mark Messier. Through WFAN's one or two radiothons per year, they have also helped raise money for World Hunger Year and the CJ Foundation For SIDS, among other charities.

=== Live play-by-play ===
On May 25, 2006, Francesa and Russo broadcast a Major League Baseball game at Shea Stadium between the Philadelphia Phillies and the New York Mets on radio for local charities. Russo did the play-by-play and Francesa did the color analysis except that they reversed the roles during the third and seventh innings. WFAN and the Mets claimed to raise over $40,000 from the event. During the game, when the two were shown on the scoreboard, they were loudly booed by the audience in Shea Stadium, primarily because neither of the two were actually Mets fans.

Before Russo and Francesa entered the booth to be broadcasters for the day, Russo mentioned that he was unsure how to correctly score a swinging strike three or a pitch taken called strike three. Russo and Francesa aired on the radio waves, whereas Gary Cohen and Keith Hernandez were the television play-by-play broadcasters.

Prior to this event, Francesa and Russo had broadcast several college basketball games for charities.

=== National Radio Hall of Fame Nominees ===
June 2016 – WFAN's legendary dynamic duo was nominated for induction into the National Radio Hall of Fame.

=== 30 For 30 documentary ===
A 30 for 30 documentary on Mike & the Mad Dog, originally planned to air in February 2017, premiered at the Tribeca Film Festival on April 21, 2017. The show was directed by Daniel H. Forer and debuted on the air on ESPN as a one-hour documentary on July 13, 2017. During an interview with The Washington Post, Forer's point in making Mike and the Mad Dog was to show just how big of an impact Francesa and Russo made on a genre that once was foreign to radio listeners but now is a fact of life.

According to Forer,

"That was one of the things that I wanted to bring out in the show: To share the story of the start of the first all-sports radio station and give a sense of what the show was like for those who had heard of the show but not heard it... It’s like a little-known rock band from England making waves with a top hit over there and you want to hear them over here. The documentary will give [viewers] a chance to see what the fuss was about."

Another quote from Forer,

"The combustibility, authenticity and passion allowed them to mix up on the show, but they had respect for each other... They are like two great boxers in the ring. They reached such high levels together, highs they couldn’t come close to when they fought other opponents."

== YES simulcast ==
Mike and the Mad Dog
- Starring: Mike Francesa; Chris Russo; Chris Shearn
- Country of origin: United States

Production
- Running time: 5 hours 30 minutes

Original release
- Network: YES Network
- Release: March 19, 2002 – August 15, 2008

Related
- various programming; various programming

On March 19, 2002, the newly signed-on YES Network began simulcasting the show. Their program opened with a sports report from Chris Shearn, who also served as producer for the simulcast, and usually played music to block the advertising that is sold on WFAN (YES often returned from commercial before WFAN does). When Francesa and Russo were out of the studio, these outside shows are also recorded live by YES. Beginning in 2007, some of the outside shows have aired in high definition as YES launched a full-time HD channel.

During WFAN's 20/20 Sports Flash reports, a selection of sports news was on the screen. Notably, the lead story on-screen (but not always in the actual report), is usually the Yankees or Nets game that will be airing on YES or WWOR-TV later that evening. YES then broadcast the traffic report during rush-hour, but did not have a graphic to illustrate the report.

Since the broadcast on YES was a simulcast, there have been times when the show was delayed or pre-empted on WFAN, usually due to New York Mets baseball. Francesa and Russo never did a show specifically for YES, so the network usually showed reruns of its original programming like Yankees Classics, Yankeeography or CenterStage in its place.

When both Francesa and Russo had the day off, YES does not broadcast the show, although other WFAN hosts, usually led by Joe Benigno, replaced Francesa and Russo as the hosts of the Mike and the Mad Dog show, complete with theme music. This was apparently because Francesa and Russo were paid additional salary by YES for the show, while other WFAN hosts are not. YES did simulcast with the substitute hosts in its first couple of years.

In 2006, the contract with YES was renewed despite the Cory Lidle controversy and some negative things that Russo said about the Yankee organization in the summer of 2006 (including a heated on-air discussion with Yankees general manager Brian Cashman). Francesa and Russo maintained that YES did not censor them on-air. Both they and YES officials have commented that the simulcast likely would have been canceled quickly if YES forced them to not criticize Yankees or Nets management. MSG Network also expressed interest in moving the show from YES.

== Radio affiliates outside of New York City ==
On July 16, 2007, WQYK in Tampa, Florida, began carrying Mike and the Mad Dog, and broadcast the show from 3:00 to 6:00 p.m. WQYK also broadcasts select New York Yankees games which do not conflict with home Tampa Bay Rays games. Tampa was the permanent residence of George Steinbrenner, and is the spring training home of the Yankees, and the location of the Class-A Tampa Yankees of the Florida State League. WQYK, like WFAN, is owned by CBS Radio.

Between 2004 and 2007, WROW in Albany, New York simulcasted the show. WROW aired the show from 2:00 until 6:00 p.m. Whenever it was either delayed or pre-empted, the station aired a montage of interviews, known as The Best of Mike and the Mad Dog, or alternate news-talk programming such as Dennis Prager. In November 2007, WROW stopped broadcasting the program and replaced the show with Mark Williams.

== Theme song ==
Each program began with a theme song jingle produced by JAM Creative Productions. The jingle package has been used for nearly the entire run of the show (originally, the theme from the Blues Brothers was used) and it is the only WFAN show not to use the station's standard jingle package. Lyrics below:

"Mike and the Mad Dog...Sports Radio 66, W-F-A-N
They're talkin' sports, goin' at it as hard as they can,
It's Mike and the Mad Dog on the FAN
Nothing can get by 'em, turn it on and try 'em, Mike and the Mad Dog, W-F-A-N"

There was an awkward moment when Jon Bon Jovi was being interviewed for an unrelated topic. At the end of the interview Jon Bon Jovi half-jokingly remarked that they needed a new theme song and that he would write and record them a new one.

== Nicknames of Francesa and Russo ==
- Fatso and Fruit Loops by nationally syndicated morning talk show host Don Imus.
- Mike and the Angry Puppy by fellow WFAN host Steve Somers.
- FranDog by Daily News sports media columnist Bob Raissman.
- Know It All and the Village Idiot by New York Post sports media columnist Phil Mushnick.

== See also ==
- Mike's On
- Mad Dog Radio
