= Levering Act =

Law enacted by the U.S. state of California in 1950

The Levering Act (Cal. Gov. Code § 3100-3109) was a law enacted by the U.S. state of California in 1950. It required state employees to subscribe to a loyalty oath that specifically disavowed radical beliefs. It was aimed in particular at employees of the University of California. Teachers lost their positions when they refused to sign loyalty oaths.

Beginning with the Cold War, following World War II, government officials in the United States feared Soviet infiltration. They fear the Soviets might influence public opinion. Several laws passed and programs are established during the Truman administration, this enhanced the federal government's authority to investigate those suspected of disloyalty, to prevent their employment by the federal government. Individual states enacted similar anti-subversion statutes.

In the late 1940s, California state employees were already required to take a general oath indicating support for the Constitutions of California and the U.S., though the requirement did not extend to employees of the quasi-independent University of California. That would require legislation to enhance the state's authority over employees of the state university. Senator Jack B. Tenney, chairman of the legislature's Committee on Un-American Activities, submitted several loyalty oath bills along with a dozen other anti-subversive proposals. In response, Robert Sproul, president of the University of California, decided on his own initiative to forestall legislative action by requiring university employees to take such an oath. It initially read:

I do solemnly swear (or affirm) that I will support the Constitution of the United States and the Constitution of the State of California, and that I will faithfully discharge the duties of my office according to the best of my ability; that I do not believe in, and I am not a member of, nor do I support any party or organization that believes in, advocates, or teaches the overthrow of the United States Government, by force or by any illegal or unconstitutional means.

The second clause was subsequently revised to read:

[...] that I am not a member of the Communist Party or under any oath or a party to any agreement or under any commitment that is in conflict with my obligations under this oath.

The California Constitution specified that no oath other than the basic statement of loyalty to the state and federal constitutions could be required of state employees. The Levering Act, named for Harold K. Levering, the Republican legislator who drafted it and managed its passage in the course of 1949-50, was designed to change that by classifying public employees as civil defense workers and using that as a rationale for requiring the new oath. The Levering Act required all employees of the state of California to take the new anti-radical loyalty oath.

The California State Federation of Teachers said in 1950:

The Levering Oath is in contradiction to the Federal Constitution since it imposes on public workers a political test for employment, deprives them of equal protection under the law as guaranteed in the 14th Amendment, and exposes them through its ambiguity to self-incrimination and perjury.

Republican Governor Earl Warren initially opposed the legislation. The University's Regents fired 31 tenured professors who refused to sign the oath on grounds of academic freedom. Warren decided to support the oath during his 1950 campaign for re-election.

== Litigation ==
In October 1952, in the legal case Tolman v. Underhill, the California Supreme Court reinstated university faculty who had been fired by the university before the Act's passage for refusing to sign the oath required by the University Regents. The court found that the Regents had exceeded their authority in imposing the oath as a condition of employment. The 18 faculty whose dismissals were at issue needed to take the oath required by the Levering Act in order to be reinstated. The case was brought by Stanley Weigel, a Republican, later member of the national committee of the ACLU and Kennedy appointment to the federal bench.

In 1953, the Supreme Court of the United States declined to hear an appeal by one of the dismissed teachers, Professor Leonard T. Pockman of San Francisco State College. The order the court issued said that the case involved no substantial federal question.

In 1967, the California Supreme Court ruled in a 6-1 decision that the Levering Act was unconstitutional. Suits on the part of individuals went on for years. Albert E. Monroe won some of the benefits he lost upon his 1950 dismissal in 1972.

Such oaths have occasionally been a point of controversy. In 2008, a Quaker teacher was fired by California State University East Bay because she edited her loyalty oath by writing "non-violently" in front of "support and defend [the U.S. and state Constitutions] against all enemies, foreign and domestic." The office of the California Attorney General said that "as a general matter, oaths may be modified to conform with individual values", suggesting that the teacher's modification was acceptable.

== Notable individuals affected ==
- Erik Erikson
- David S. Saxon
- Pauline Sperry
- Edward C. Tolman
- Gian Carlo Wick
- Charles Muscatine
- Ludwig Edelstein
- Edwin Sill Fussell
- Margaret Hodgen
- Ernst Kantorowicz
- Harold Lewis
- Hans Lewy
- John Beecher
- Jacob Loewenberg
- Edward H. Schafer
