= Tobias Simon =

American lawyer

Tobias Simon (1929-1982) was a civil rights lawyer, in Miami, Florida, USA, perhaps best known for his work in the 1960s defending the Rev. Dr. Martin Luther King Jr. and other activists. Simon provided legal counsel regarding marches in Florida and throughout the Deep South. Simon also was a leader of Florida opposition to the death penalty in the 1960s and 1970s and was particularly concerned about the discriminatory imposition of the death penalty on African-Americans, as well as the Florida case against loyalty oaths, Cramp v. Board of Public Instruction, which was argued before the Supreme Court of the United States in 1961. Simon offered to represent Clarence Gideon after his case was turned back to the lower court after Gideon v. Wainwright, but was rejected.

Simon was a native of Montreal, a graduate of Harvard Law School, began his law career in New York City, and moved to Miami. He died of cancer in February 1982, at the age of 52.

The Tobias Simon Pro Bono Service Award, created in 1982, is Florida's highest statewide pro bono award. It is presented annually by the chief justice to a private lawyer for voluntary, free legal services to the poor. It is intended to encourage extraordinary contributions by recognizing the Florida attorney who best exemplifies the highest ideals of the profession by making legal services available to people who otherwise could not afford them, and to focus public awareness on the substantial voluntary services rendered by Florida lawyers in this area. The Tobias Simon Pro Bono Service Award is believed to be the first of its kind in the country conferring recognition by the state's highest court.
