= Ludwig Edelstein =

German-born American classical scholar and historian of medicine (1902–1965)

Ludwig Edelstein (23 April 1902 – 16 August 1965) was a classical scholar and historian of medicine.

== Personal life and career ==
Edelstein was born in Berlin, Germany, to Isidor and Mathilde Adler Edelstein. He attended the University of Berlin from 1921 to 1924 and received his Ph.D. at the University of Heidelberg in 1929. He was married to Emma J. Levy on 25 Oct. 1928.

Because he and his wife were Jewish, Edelstein lost his academic position and had to flee from Germany in 1933 when the Nazis came to power. Upon his arrival in the US in 1934, he took up an appointment at Johns Hopkins University. Subsequently, he taught at the University of Washington and the University of California at Berkeley, from which he resigned rather than sign the Levering Act loyalty oath. He then returned to Johns Hopkins, where he had appointments at the university in Philosophy and at the School of Medicine in History of Medicine. At the university he taught ancient Greek philosophy in undergraduate and graduate seminars and courses.

Edelstein's 1943 translation and commentary on the Hippocratic Oath was influential on contemporary thinking about medical ethics. He was an inspiring and beloved teacher. Several of his Hopkins students became accomplished scholars. He retired from Hopkins and spent his last years at New York's Rockefeller Institute when it transformed from being a medical research institute into being a science university. He was elected to the American Philosophical Society in 1954.

== Works ==
- The Hippocratic Oath: Text, Translation, Interpretation (1943)
- Asclepius: Collection and Interpretation of the Testimonies (1945) with Emma J. Edelstein
- Wielands "Abderiten" und der Deutsche Humanismus (1950)
- Plato's Seventh Letter (1966)
- The Idea of Progress in Classical Antiquity (1967)
- The Meaning of Stoicism (1968) Martin Classical Lectures Volume XXI, see the Italian edition edited and introduced by Christian Vassallo (Il significato dello Stoicismo, Turin, UTET-Mondadori, 2025)
- Ancient Medicine: Selected Papers of Ludwig Edelstein (1967) edited by Owsei Temkin and C. Lilian Temkin
- Posidonius: Volume I: The Fragments (1972) editor with Ian G. Kidd

== See also ==
- Harold F. Cherniss, historian of ancient philosophy, friend and colleague of Edelstein
