= Howard Dixon =

American lawyer

Howard W. Dixon (August 4, 1915 – July 30, 2007) was a civil rights attorney in Miami between 1955 and 1997. During that time, he was considered an activist for the rights of poor people and ethnic and racial minorities. He served as General Counsel for the NAACP in the '50s, was a founding Board Member of the Florida Civil Liberties Union. He was the founding executive director of Legal Service of Greater Miami, a program that grew out of President Lyndon Johnson's 1964 War on Poverty. He served as Executive Director from 1966 to 1977. After his retirement as a General Master for the Florida Court System in 1987, he served as a full-time volunteer for the Legal Aid Society of Greater Miami, earning him the John Minor Wisdom Public Service and Professionalism Award for Pro Bono Service by the American Bar Association in 1995.

As Executive Director for Legal Services of Greater Miami, led several U.S. Supreme Court victories, including Agrersinger vs. Hamlin and Fuentes vs. Shevin in 1972. The cases allowed for people to have counsel and hearings in specific situations. In 1990, Dixon was awarded the Florida Supreme Court's highest honor, the Tobias Simon Pro Bono Award.

In 1961, as an attorney for the Florida Civil Liberties Union, Dixon defended the Freedom Riders in Tallahassee, Florida. He established legal precedence in the case regarding emergency appeals from the State to the Federal courts. The case became famous in legal circles at that time as a method to remove lawsuits from state to federal jurisdiction when all state remedies have not been exhausted.

Dixon was named in the amicus brief with the American Civil Liberties Union to the Florida Supreme Court urging reversal for Gideon vs. Wainwright, the case that supported the sixth amendment of the constitution to provide counsel in criminal cases for defendants unable to afford their own attorneys.
