= Mike'd Up: The Francesa Sports Final =

Mike'd Up was Mike Francesa's Sunday late-night sports talk show on WNBC-TV. On July 19, 2011, Francesa announced on WFAN that he will end the show so he can spend more time with his family. WNBC's head sports anchor, Bruce Beck succeeded Francesa as show host. In September 2013, WNBC renamed the program, Sports Final.

== Program format ==
Monologue about the sports news of the day, followed by interview discussion with guests who have either direct or indirect significance with the following franchises:

- New York Yankees
- New York Mets
- New York Giants
- New York Jets
- New York Knicks (seldom)
- Brooklyn Nets (seldom)

== On location ==
Mike'd Up was at the newly expanded Rutgers Stadium on Sunday, September 6, 2009.
