= Loyalty oath =

Pledge of allegiance

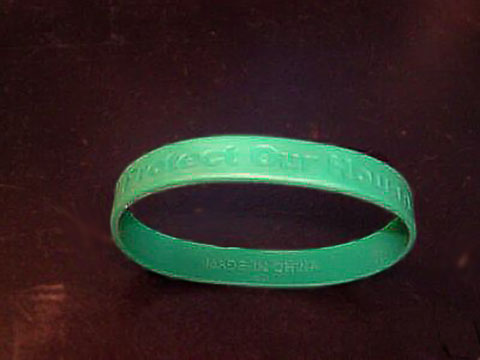
Countrywide Financial Corporation's loyalty bracelet bearing the slogan "Protect Our House". In 2007, employees were issued the wristbands upon signing a loyalty oath. According to a senior CFC officer, the consequence of not getting such a wristband was "I will lose my job."

A loyalty oath is a pledge of allegiance to an organization, institution, or state of which an individual is a member.

== In the United States ==
In the United States, such an oath has often indicated that the affiant has not been a member of a particular organization or organizations mentioned in the oath. The U.S. Supreme Court allows the oath to be a form of legal document.

=== Civil War and Reconstruction ===
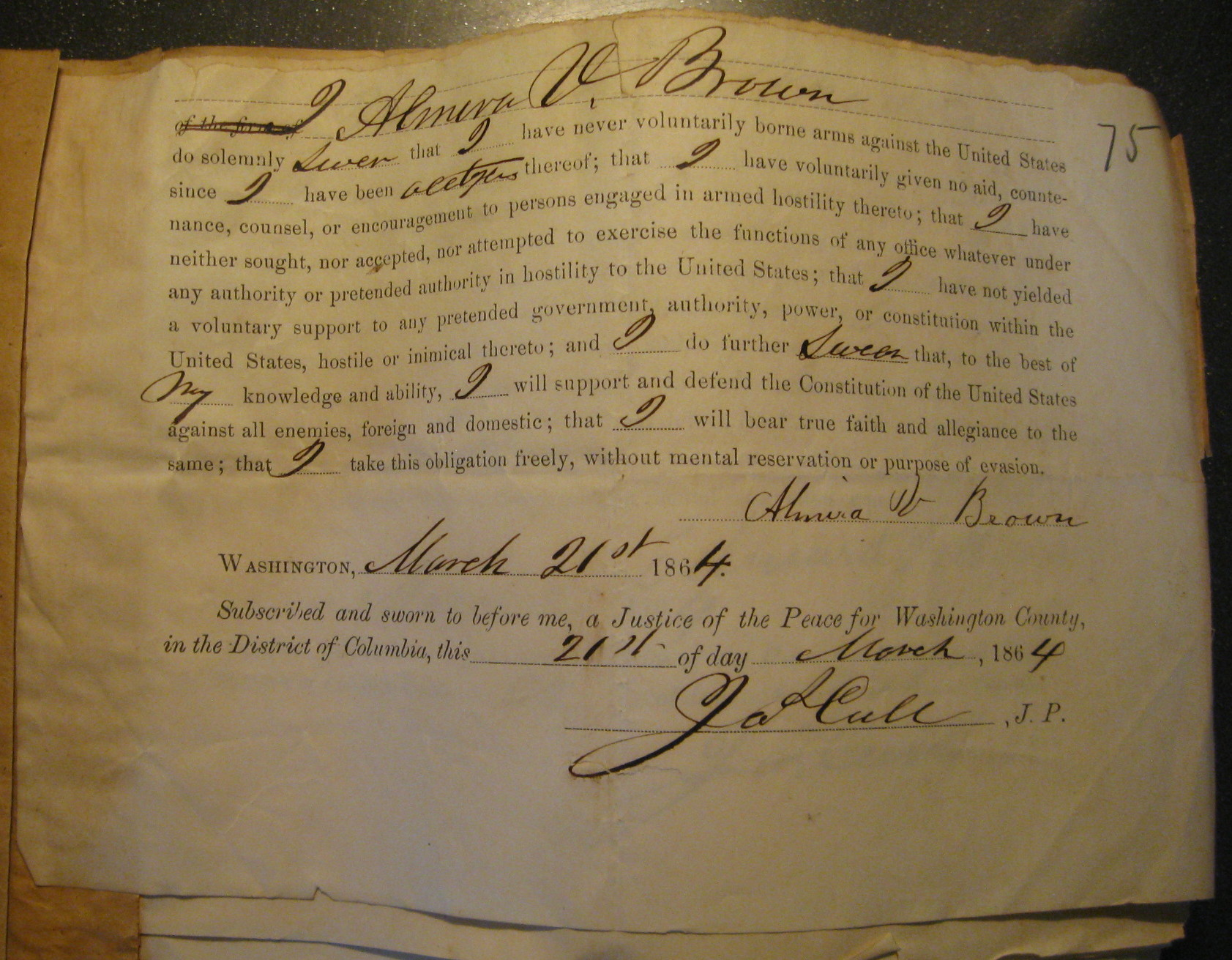
During the Civil War the United States federal government required all naval shipyard workers to sign a loyalty oath.

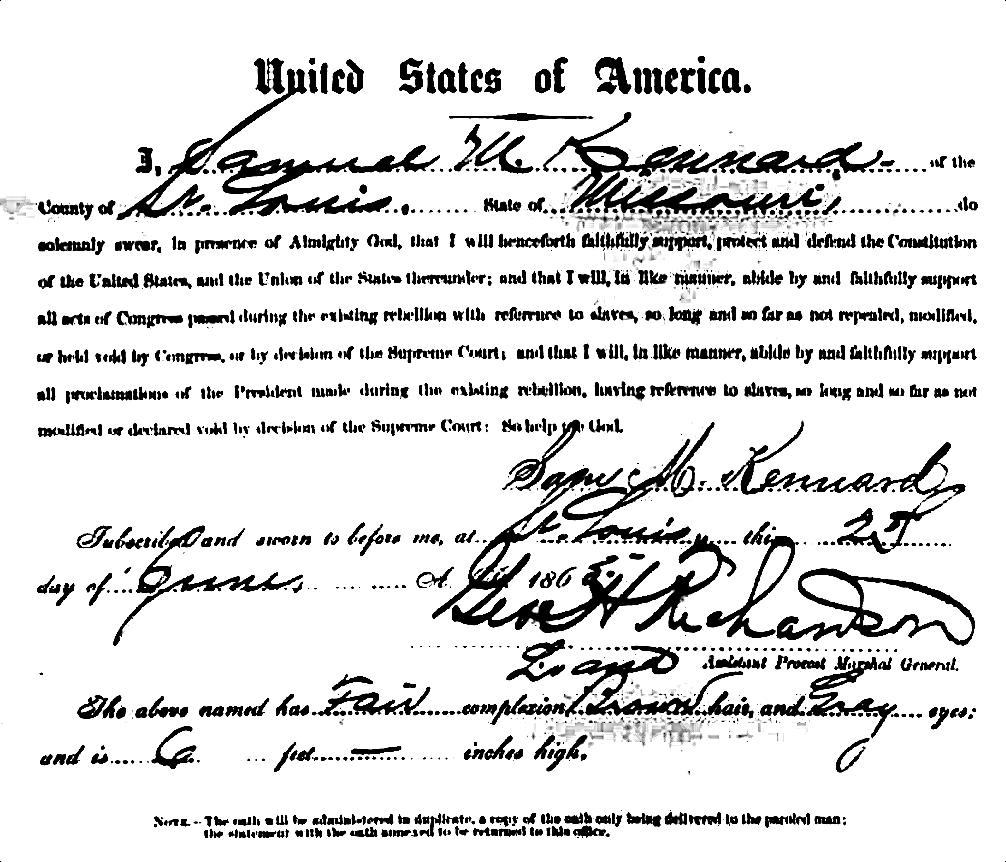
Oath to defend the Constitution of the United States and, among other promises, to "abide by and faithfully support all acts of Congress passed during the . . . rebellion having reference to slaves . . . ," signed by former Confederate officer Samuel M. Kennard on June 27, 1865

During the American Civil War, political prisoners and Confederate prisoners of war were often released upon taking an "oath of allegiance". Lincoln's ten percent plan featured an oath to "faithfully support, protect and defend the Constitution of the United States, and the union of the States thereunder" as a condition for a Presidential pardon. During Reconstruction, retroactive loyalty oaths were proposed by Radical Republicans, which would have barred former Confederates and Confederate sympathizers from federal, state, or local offices. Beginning in 1862, all U.S. Naval shipyard employees were required to sign a loyalty oath as a condition of employment.

=== 1930s to 1950s ===
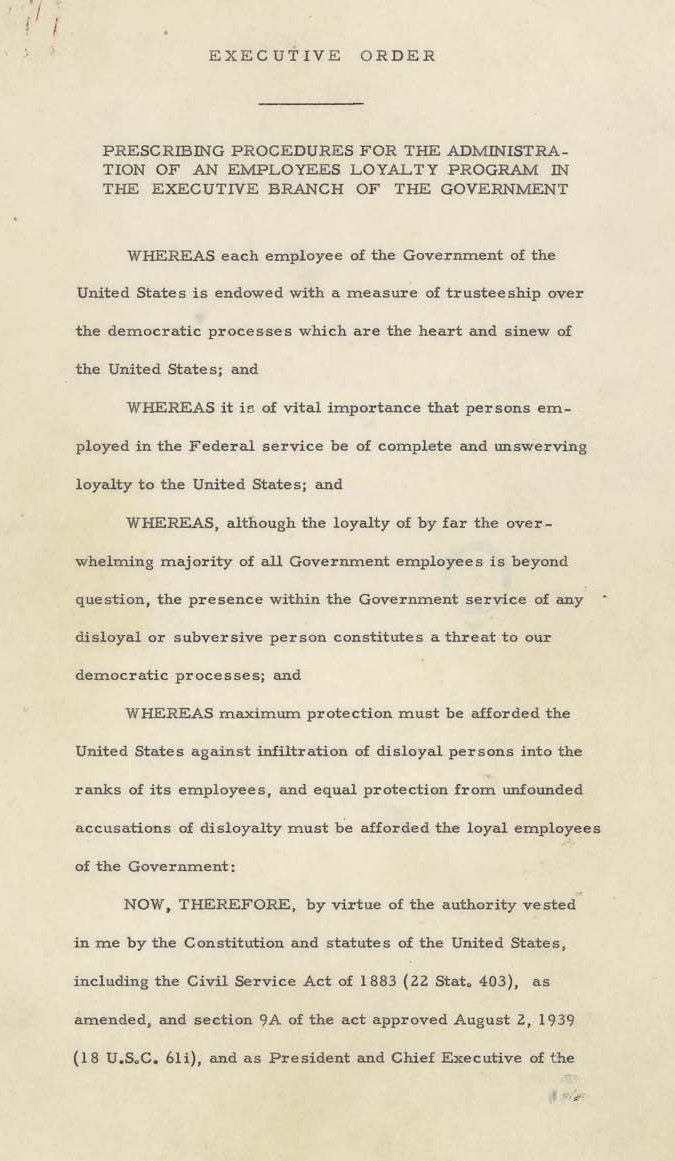
Page one of Executive Order 9835, signed by Harry S. Truman in 1947

In support of Roosevelt's National Recovery Administration, 100,000 school children marched to Boston Common and swore a loyalty oath administered by the mayor, "I promise as a good American citizen to do my part for the NRA. I will buy only where the Blue Eagle flies."

Loyalty oaths were common during World War II.

Another use of loyalty oaths in the United States was during the 1950s and 1960s. The Red Scare during the 1950s and the Congressional hearings chaired by Senator Joseph McCarthy helped to sustain a national mood of concern about communist agents and a fear such agents may injure the U.S. government through espionage, outright violence, or speech.

==== Executive Order 9835 "Loyalty Order" (1947) ====
On March 21, 1947, concerned with Soviet subversive penetration and infiltration into the United States government by American citizens who held oaths of allegiance to a foreign power during wartime, President Harry S Truman instituted a Loyalty Program by signing Executive Order 9835, also known as the "Loyalty Order." It required loyalty oaths and background investigations on persons deemed suspect of holding party membership in organizations that advocated violent and anti-democratic programs.

==== The University of California loyalty oath (1950) ====
The Levering Act was a law enacted by the U.S. state of California in 1950. It required state employees to subscribe to a loyalty oath that specifically disavowed radical beliefs. It was aimed in particular at employees of the University of California. In January 1950, 750 faculty members had approved a resolution to oppose the university's regents and create a committee to coordinate legal action against the university should an oath be required. Several teachers resigned in protest or lost their positions when they refused to sign the loyalty oath. Among those who left were the psychologist Erik Erikson and the classical scholar Ludwig Edelstein, both of them Jewish refugees from Nazi Germany. In August 1950, the regents fired 31 faculty members who refused to sign the oath. Those who were terminated sued, and by 1952 had been rehired when the university declined to pursue its case against them in court. One of the fired faculty members, the physics professor David Saxon, went on with his career and was appointed president of the entire University of California system in 1975, a job he held until 1983.

==== Garner v. Board of Public Works (1951) ====
Typically, a loyalty oath has wording similar to that mentioned in the U.S Supreme Court decision of Garner v. Board of Public Works:

I further swear (or affirm) that I do not advise, advocate or teach, and have not within the period beginning five (5) years prior to the effective date of the ordinance requiring the making of this oath or affirmation, advised, advocated or taught, the overthrow by force, violence or other unlawful means, of the Government of the United States of America or of the State of California and that I am not now and have not, within said period, been or become a member of or affiliated with any group, society, association, organization or party which advises, advocates or teaches, or has, within said period, advised, advocated or taught, the overthrow by force, violence or other unlawful means of the Government of the United States of America, or of the State of California. I further swear (or affirm) that I will not, while I am in the service of the City of Los Angeles, advise, advocate or teach, or be or become a member of or affiliated with any group, association, society, organization or party which advises, advocates or teaches, or has within said period, advised, advocated or taught, the overthrow by force, violence or other unlawful means, of the Government of the United States of America or of the State of California . . . .

==== Speiser v. Randall (1958) ====
In Speiser v. Randall, the U.S. Supreme Court addressed the State of California's loyalty oath, as required by a California law enacted in 1954, as a condition of exemption from property tax. In applying for property tax exemption as a veteran of World War II, ACLU lawyer Lawrence Speiser had refused to sign the loyalty oath. The court ruled that because the state required the claimant to show they are not advocating state overthrow and hence are not criminals within the applicable laws, the loyalty oath requirement to obtain the tax exemption is unconstitutional. The burden of proof for a criminal action rest on the state and not on the individual private citizen.

=== 1960s ===
The oaths were repeatedly challenged on grounds that they violated the principles of freedom of speech and freedom of association. The United States Supreme Court avoided addressing these problems during the McCarthy Era. During the 1960s, it began striking down such oaths on the basis of vagueness and undue breadth. October 16, 1961, Tobias Simon and Howard Dixon argued Cramp v. Board of Public Instruction before the Supreme Court. In 1962 the Court struck down the Florida requirement that teachers swear "I have not and will not lend my aid, support, advice, counsel or influence to the Communist party". This decision was followed in 1964 by its lack of support for two oaths, one of which required teachers to promote respect for the flag, reverence for law and order, and loyalty to the institutions of the United States and the State of Washington. Arizona and New York teacher oaths affirming lack of association with subversive organizations were struck down in 1966 and 1967.

New York Education Law Section 3002 requires that any "teacher, instructor or professor in any [state] school or institution in the public school system ... or in any school, college, university or other educational institution" sign an oath pledging support for the federal and state constitutions. The law does not apply to foreign nationals, but only to United States citizens. The law was enacted in 1934 in response to a nationwide campaign by the American Legion. The law was challenged by a group of 27 faculty members from Adelphi University in 1966 because the oath constrained free speech, and because it selectively applied to faculty members but not staff. For unknown reasons, Adelphi faculty had never been required to sign the oath until 1966 when a staff member in the New York State Education Department discovered the oversight. On January 22, 1968, after moving through the judicial system, the United States Supreme Court affirmed an earlier District Court decision upholding the constitutionality of the law. This was the first occasion on which the Supreme Court evaluated the constitutionality of oaths of this type.

=== Catholic colleges and universities in North America ===
Using formulas published in 1989 by the Congregation for the Doctrine of the Faith, certain non-ecclesiastical Catholic colleges and universities began requiring faculty members to make a Profession of Faith and take an Oath of Fidelity as a condition of employment.

==== Last major loyalty oath case (1972) ====
The last major loyalty oath case heard by the court was decided in 1972, when it upheld a requirement that State of Massachusetts employees swear to uphold and defend the Constitution and to "oppose the overthrow of the [government] by force, violence, or by any illegal or unconstitutional method".

During a case in 1972, Cole v. Richardson, the court declared four requirements needed for an oath to clear First Amendment muster:

1. It cannot go against the First or Fourteenth Amendment rights.
2. The oath cannot keep an employee from participating in protected public speaking.
3. Freedom of association cannot be used in oath as protected by the Constitution.
4. The oath should be direct and clear, so no question comes to what is meant.

=== 2000s ===
==== 2004 Bush presidential campaign ====
During the 2004 presidential campaign, the campaign of George W. Bush sometimes required all attendants at its rallies to take an oath. Those who refused to take the oath were not allowed to attend the rally. The "loyalty oath" was actually a pledge of endorsement. These endorsements were used during some of the campaign rallies in 2004. The Bush campaign asserted that the oath was valid because the president was conducting a partisan campaign event. Opponents countered that the oath was intrusive to individual conscience and denied general public access to the president.

==== California ====
The California state constitution requires all state workers who are US citizens to sign a loyalty oath as a term of employment. On February 28, 2008, the California State University, East Bay fired Marianne Kearney-Brown, a Quaker, for refusing to do so without inserting a reservation that her defense of the state and country would be done "nonviolently." She was reinstated a week later, when she agreed to sign the oath when accompanied by a document prepared by the university that included the clarification "Signing the oath does not carry with it any obligation or requirement that public employees bear arms or otherwise engage in violence."

The text of that oath begins: "STATE OATH OF ALLEGIANCE I do solemnly swear (or affirm) that I will support and defend the Constitution of the United States and the Constitution of the State of California against all enemies, foreign and domestic; that I will bear true faith and allegiance to the Constitution of the United States and the Constitution of the State of California; that I take this obligation freely, without any mental reservation or purpose of evasion; and that I will well and faithfully discharge the duties upon which I am about to enter."

==== Arizona ====
Arizona requires all employees of the state, its counties and localities to sign an oath of loyalty to the country and the state. The oath requirement predates statehood; it was successfully challenged in the 1960s over wording banning Communist Party membership and was rewritten in 2003.

==== Ohio ====
In the March 2008 State of Ohio presidential primary, some people might have been required to sign a loyalty oath in order to vote. Voters who wish to switch their party affiliation on Primary Election Day and who are challenged are supposed to sign a statement "stating that the person desires to be affiliated with and supports the principles of the political party whose ballot the person desires to vote." The statement is signed under penalty of "election falsification." If the challenged person refuses to sign the statement under penalty of election falsification, he is given a provisional ballot.

The Cleveland Plain Dealer, among others, thus describes the nature of the statement and effect of "election falsification": Anyone who signs this loyalty oath, but does not intend to honor it, can be prosecuted for "election falsification", a fifth-degree felony.

The statute, however, describes the offense differently: "No person, either orally or in writing, on oath lawfully administered or in a statement made under penalty of election falsification, shall knowingly state a falsehood as to a material matter relating to an election in a proceeding before a court, tribunal, or election official, or in a matter in relation to which an oath or statement under penalty of election falsification is authorized by law..." Thus the requirement is, arguably, more a statement of current intent than a loyalty oath's promise of future support.

==== Washington ====
Efforts to repeal the Washington's anti-communist loyalty oath legislation failed in 2013.

=== 2010s ===
==== 2016 Trump presidential campaign ====
During the 2016 Republican Party presidential primaries, the campaign of Donald Trump sometimes required all attendants at its rallies to take an oath. Fellow candidate Ted Cruz likened it pledging to a king.

== Israel ==
Israeli politician Avigdor Lieberman proposed in 2009 that Israeli citizens should be required to sign a loyalty oath, vowing allegiance to Israel as a Jewish, democratic state, to accept its symbols, flag and anthem, and to commit to military service or some alternative service. Those who refused would lose their citizenship and right to vote. In the Jewish Week, Lieberman justified his "no loyalty – no citizenship" by stating that he had heard "Israeli Arab leaders" calling for "the destruction of the State of Israel" and suicide bombings at pro-Hamas rallies.

Lieberman compared his "responsible citizenship" platform with the U.S. naturalization process: "In the U.S., those requesting a Green Card must take an oath that they will fulfill the rights and duties of citizenship." Ethan Bronner noted in the New York Times that the American practice only applies to naturalized citizens while Lieberman's oath would apply to all Israeli citizens.

On 10 October 2010 the Israeli cabinet approved a loyalty oath bill changing oath of citizenship for non-Jews from "I declare that I will be a loyal national of the State of Israel" to "I swear that I will be a loyal citizen to the state of Israel, as a Jewish and democratic state, and will uphold its laws" (no oath is required of Jews seeking citizenship). Far-right Knesset member Michael Ben-Ari felt that the vote vindicated Meir Kahane:

Twenty years have passed since the assassination of Rabbi Kahane, and today Likud admits he was right. It's a refreshing change to see the Likud government, which persecuted the rabbi over his call to have Arabs sign a loyalty oath, admit today that what Kahane said 20 years ago was correct.

However, on October 18, Prime Minister Benjamin Netanyahu ordered Justice minister Ya'akov Ne'eman to extend Cabinet-level debate on the bill in order to add amendments which make the loyalty oath universal to both Jewish and non-Jewish immigrants who seek citizenship. This inclusion of Jewish immigrants was supported by the Anti-Defamation League. The bill did not pass and the oath remained unchanged.

== See also ==
- Bushido
- Chinese Communist Party Admission Oath
- Communist Party USA
- Oath of allegiance
- Oath of office
- Pledge of Allegiance (United States)
- Sedition Act of 1918
- Smith Act

=== US Supreme Court cases involving loyalty oaths ===
- American Communications Ass'n. v. Douds, 339 U.S. 382 (1950)
- Gerende v. Board of Supervisors, 341 U.S. 56 (1951)
- Garner v. Board of Public Works, 341 U.S. 716 (1951)
- Speiser v. Randall, 357 U.S. 513 (1958)
- Cole v. Richardson, 405 U.S. 676 (1972)
