= Mike Francesa =

American sports radio host (born 1954)

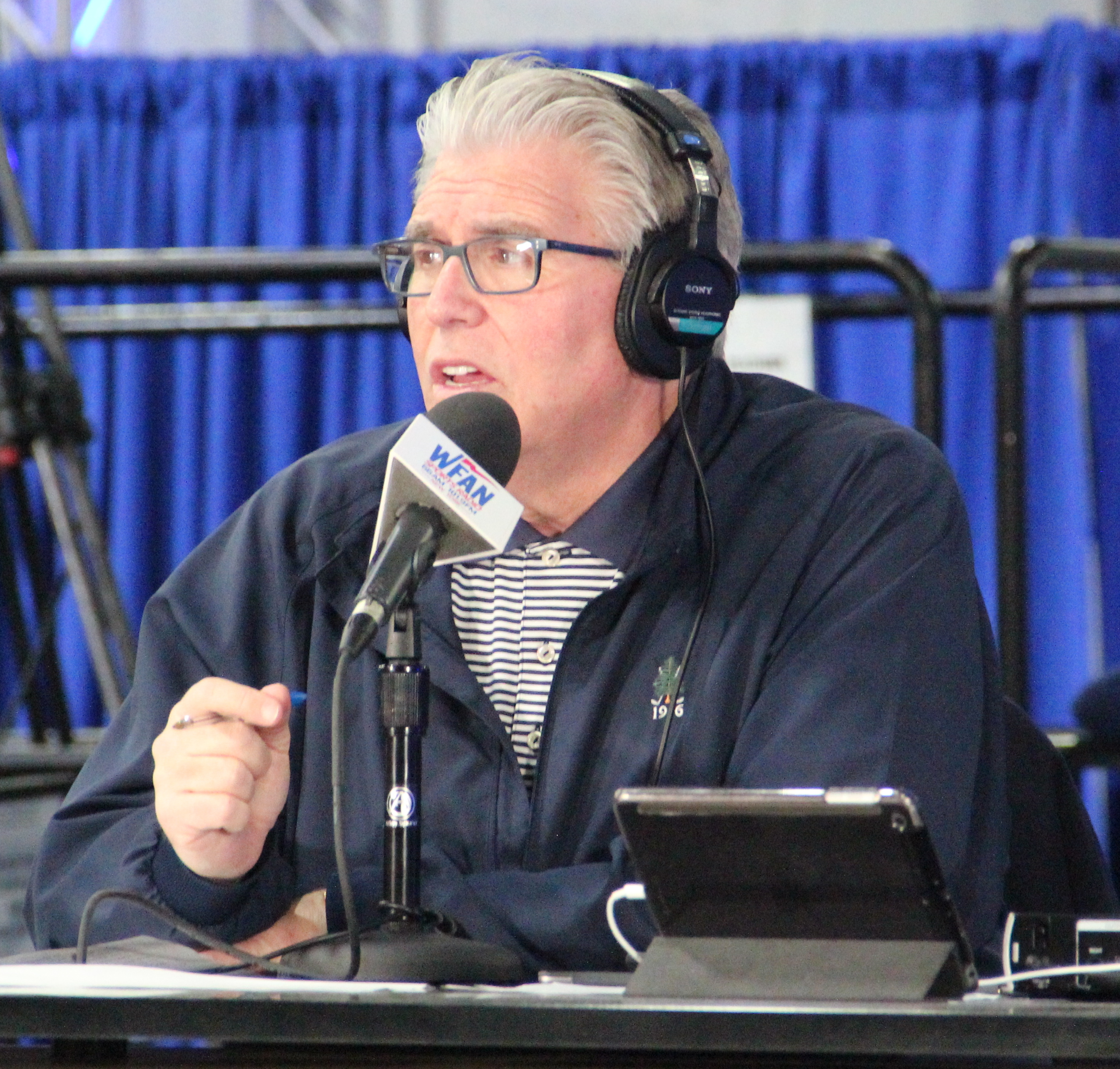
- Francesa at Super Bowl LIII Radio Row, 2019
- Born: Michael Patrick Francesa; March 20, 1954 (age 72); Long Beach, New York, U.S.
- Children: 3
- Presenting career
- Show: Mike's On: RADIO.COM (2020); Mike's On: Francesa on the FAN (2008–2017, 2018–2019); The NFL Now (1987–2016); Mike'd Up: The Francesa Sports Final (2003–2011); Mike and the Mad Dog (1989–2008)
- Style: Sports radio
- Country: United States

Michael Patrick Francesa (born March 20, 1954) is an American sports-radio talk-show host. Together with Chris Russo, he launched Mike and the Mad Dog in 1989 on WFAN in New York City, which ran until 2008.

On December 15, 2017, Francesa retired from his own show, Mike's On: Francesa on the FAN, which had been airing in the afternoon-drive slot formerly occupied by Mike and the Mad Dog. He was succeeded by Chris Carlin, Maggie Gray and Bart Scott in the same time slot for the first ratings book of 2018.

On April 27, 2018, WFAN announced that Francesa would return to the station for a 3 1/2-hour afternoon show, a shorter shift than his original slot. Francesa hosted this shortened afternoon drive WFAN slot during a tumultuous tenure through the end of 2019 before he retired for a second time, moving to a half-hour evening slot on WFAN while also producing content for the Entercom-owned Radio.com platform, which began in January 2020. On March 24, 2020, Francesa was tapped to return to the station for a daytime slot on Sundays, and on May 26, 2020, he returned to WFAN on weekdays for an hour each day. On July 24, 2020, Francesa retired for the third time, citing the desire for more time with his family. Since 2022, he hosts The Mike Francesa Podcast with BetRivers Network.

== Early life ==
Francesa was born and raised in Long Beach, New York. He is the second son of Michael Anthony Francesa, who abandoned the family when Francesa was eight years old, and his mother Marilyn, who raised him as a single parent. He has an older brother John and had a younger brother named Marty who committed suicide on November 27, 1990. Francesa attended Maria Regina High School in Uniondale (now known as Kellenberg Memorial High School) and graduated from St. John's University in 1977 (transferring there after one year at the University of South Florida), majoring in communications and athletic administration.

== Career ==
=== 1982–1993: CBS Sports ===
Francesa started his career by spending six years at College and Pro Football Newsweekly. He was hired by CBS Sports in 1982 as a researcher, focusing primarily on college sports. At CBS Sports, he was initially a behind-the-scenes, statistics-wielding editorial assistant, but network executives were so impressed by his knowledge that he was made a studio analyst for college basketball and football and acquired such a reputation that The New Yorker termed him "Brent Musburger's brain." Francesa said that the most common complaint about him while he was a studio analyst at CBS Sports was about his New York accent.

ESPN tried to lure Francesa as its studio expert for college football, college basketball and the NFL in 1991, but he declined their offer.

Francesa announced on the radio that he quit CBS on April 1, 1993 before the 1993 Final Four began.

=== 1989–2008: Mike and the Mad Dog on WFAN ===
When WFAN was launched in 1987, Francesa applied for a host job. However, station management was looking for top-shelf types rather than someone with no experience, and he was only offered a producer's job, which he ended up rejecting. With his then-wife Kate's encouragement, Francesa continued to pursue WFAN. Finally, WFAN gave him a job as a weekend host talking college football and basketball in August 1987. Because of the positive reviews, Francesa began to guest-host other shows.

Because of his initial success as a weekend and fill-in host, he was teamed with local New York City host Ed Coleman, and the duo had a popular show on the 10 a.m. – 2 p.m. slot. In 1989, WFAN was looking for hosts to replace the controversial Pete Franklin in the afternoon drive time period between 3 and 7 p.m. Station management decided to team the knowledgeable, but somewhat dry Francesa with the young and vibrant Chris Russo. While Francesa's brand of sports commentating was considered hard-hitting and serious, Russo's was lighter, unconventional, and more entertaining. The show was dubbed Mike and the Mad Dog. The show quickly gained popularity and was a staple of the New York sports scene from 1989 to 2008. The duo won the 2000 Marconi Award for Major Market Personality of the Year. They were the first sports-talk hosts ever to win the award.

Francesa also hosted a weekly radio show called The NFL Now, which originated from WFAN and aired from 1987 to 2016. It eventually became syndicated and at one time was simulcast on MSNBC and later via video Webcast on NBCSports.com. The NFL Now became a syndicated program again when WBZ-FM in Boston started airing the show, a few weeks after the station's launch.

Francesa also provided the nightly "Sportstime" commentary on the CBS Radio Network and Westwood One. Francesa regularly contributed to the Imus in the Morning program with his views on sports while it aired on WFAN and Westwood One.

=== 2008–2017: Solo career ===
On August 14, 2008, it was announced that Russo had decided to leave WFAN, and thus ended the Mike and the Mad Dog show two weeks shy of its 19th anniversary. This ended two months of speculation regarding the show's future. At the same time, Francesa signed a five-year deal to stay at WFAN. On September 8, 2008, Francesa's new solo WFAN program began, titled Mike'd Up, the same name as that of his former weekly television program on WNBC. Francesa's show was simulcast on the YES Network from 2008 until 2014.

On January 17, 2012, the show was renamed Mike's On. After Francesa left the show Mike'd Up: The Francesa Sports Final on WNBC, the television station retained the rights to the name of the show. NBC and CBS did not reach an agreement for the rights, causing WFAN to change the name.

During his show's time on the YES Network, Francesa's trademark show introduction was: "From the studios of WFAN in New York and simulcast across the country on the YES Network, this is Mike's On: Francesa on the FAN."

On September 10, 2012, Francesa fell asleep live on air during a segment with Yankees beat reporter Sweeny Murti. He later denied that he had fallen asleep after national ridicule and mockery, including that from callers to the show.

On March 24, 2014, Francesa's show began broadcasting nationally on Fox Sports 1. He changed his trademark intro to the show to "From the studios of WFAN in New York and simulcast across the country on Fox Sports 1, this is Mike's On: Francesa on the FAN." The relationship with Fox Sports was tumultuous at times, and Francesa's contract ended on September 11, 2015. Francesa took primary responsibility for the failure of the relationship. During his entire solo run, Francesa hosted the top-rated drive-time sports-talk show in the New York market.

On March 30, 2016, Francesa and Russo hosted a Mike and the Mad Dog reunion show at Radio City Music Hall.

On December 24, 2016, Francesa aired his last Mike Francesa Football Sunday after CBS declined to renew it for 2017.

== Initial retirement ==
On January 19, 2016, Francesa stated that he planned to leave WFAN when his contract with the station expired at the end of 2017. On May 3, 2017, WFAN announced WFAN Presents: Mike Francesa, A Night to Remember, to be held at the LIU Post Tilles Center on November 15 at 7:30 p.m. WFAN broadcast Francesa's penultimate radio show live from the Paley Center for Media. His final day on WFAN was December 15, 2017. Francesa signed off at 6:26 p.m. EST on December 15, 2017, with these final words:

"I want to thank you guys, the listeners, the audience. Because without you—we don't last a week. We don't last a month. So, what I'd like to say to you is, 'I will miss you. I thank you. And, from the bottom of my heart, I love you. Goodbye.'"

== Return and launch of app ==
=== 2018 ===
On April 24, 2018, just over four months after having retired from WFAN, Francesa announced his intention to return. The station confirmed the decision, stating that he would return to afternoon drive, albeit with a shorter show running from 3:00–6:30 p.m. Monday through Friday.

On August 23, 2018, Francesa launched a subscription-based mobile app known as Mike's On, which provides a live video stream of his daily WFAN show, archived interviews from previous shows, his Sunday NFL show and Saturday college football show and occasional live reactions to sporting events. The $8.99-per-month price of the service was widely criticized by the media.

After returning to WFAN, Francesa won the fall 2018 ratings book, the first since his return, with an average of 6.4 percent of the listening audience as compared to the 5.8 registered by The Michael Kay Show's 5.8, the show opposite Francesa's time slot on the New York ESPN affiliate WEPN-FM. The total included both the over-the-air radio listening audience and WFAN's online streaming audience, which has traditionally been included in the total audience rating because WFAN has different advertising on each format. Without the stream, Francesa would have still won the fall 2018 book during the time slot by a share of 5.9–5.8 over Kay's show.

=== 2019 ===
In the winter 2019 ratings book, Francesa received a 6.2 percent share of the listening audience compared to the 5.9 received by The Michael Kay Show during the same time slot. The total included both the over-the-air share as well as the WFAN online streaming. However, Kay beat Francesa 5.9–5.5 in the radio segment, and both hosts claimed victory on their respective shows. After hearing that Kay was celebrating victory over the disputed ratings book, Francesa said on his April 15, 2019, show that "I have nothing but sadness and pity for you that you would actually claim a victory that wasn't real” as well as saying that "you're ESPN, and you get beat like a rented mule for 20 years, it's got to hurt." Francesa later tweeted that "there was only one possible way to read [the ratings]" and that "anyone, and that means anyone, who says differently is either a fool or a liar." Francesa also felt the stress of a close ratings battle for the first time in his sports-radio career, and became embroiled in a heated argument with WFAN management about the availability of a Craig Carton post-sentencing interview on the last few days of the ratings book after Carton had been interviewed by Kay.

On April 28, 2019, Francesa became the center of controversy again, appearing to shame both the New York Giants and their 2019 sixth-round draft pick Corey Ballentine after Ballentine was wounded in a drive-by shooting the day before. Francesa said that the incident contrasted with the "great character" of the draft class that the Giants claimed to have picked, despite evidence that the shooting was completely random. After some media members picked up on the comments, such as Francesa's fellow WFAN hosts Boomer and Gio, Francesa retreated from the opinion on his next day's show, but launched a fiery rant on their morning show the same day, accusing them of purposely distributing misinformation about him and his comments.

On May 16, 2019, Francesa fell asleep on the air while taking a call from a listener.

On September 3, 2019, it was announced that WFAN's owner Entercom had acquired the intellectual property of the Mike's On app, and that its content would be integrated into the company's Radio.com platform, with no additional subscription required. The Mike's On app was discontinued by the end of September, with its content having been made available for free. Francesa never revealed the number of paying customers for his app, which was roundly criticized by the media throughout its existence.

While delivering his "5 Minute Morning" recording on November 4, 2019, Francesa appeared to release flatulence while on the air, which was turned into a mainstream news story on several online publications, including the New York Daily News. Francesa later denied that the incident had occurred, saying on his afternoon show the same day that it was "fake news" and that the media was desperate for a headline.

In the fall 2019 ratings book, Francesa's third full book since his return, his WFAN show lost to The Michael Kay Show in direct head-to-head ratings, dethroning Francesa from the top of the New York sports ratings for the first time in his career, spanning back to 1989. In the book, Francesa was outrated by Kay 7.4–5.5, with Francesa's total share rising to 6.0 after including streaming. In response to his first-ever ratings-book loss, Francesa criticized Kay and his cohosts, claiming that "celebrating [their] success now would be the same as spiking the football after finally scoring a TD in a game that is 77–0!"

During his radio comeback, Francesa's show was the target of criticism for reasons ranging from his frequent inaccurate predictions to his treatment of callers. His show was described as "grumbles and contentious conversations with callers on a regular basis" by Deadspin, and Francesa was noted for responding negatively to a caller who told him that Stan Lee had died. Video clips of Francesa making inaccurate predictions often went viral on Twitter, with players such as Virginia basketball's Ty Jerome coming onto the show to specifically address them. Francesa also received attention for maintaining that Tiger Woods had "nil" chance after the second round to win the 2019 Masters Tournament, which Woods later won, and then later claiming that the video clips that contained the inaccurate predictions were doctored or altered.

In a November 2019 interview, Francesa's former Mike and the Mad Dog cohost Chris Russo called Francesa's radio comeback "unhealthy". Russo revealed that he and Francesa had not spoken since March 2018 and said: "Mike should never have come back. He should have stayed retired." Russo also conjectured that Francesa may have realized toward the end of his second afternoon drive run that it was a mistake.

== Second retirement and second return ==
On November 5, 2019, Francesa announced his retirement from WFAN for a second time, announcing he would leave the station that December. On December 6, 2019, he hosted his final afternoon show, giving thanks to both the station and the listeners.

Francesa's departure left WFAN needing a replacement for its afternoon-drive slot, which was eventually filled by Joe Benigno and Evan Roberts, who had formerly hosted the midday show.

After Francesa left his afternoon-drive show, WFAN announced that he would not be leaving the station altogether and would instead host a shortened show in a later timeslot. On December 16, 2019, Francesa revealed that he would host a 30-minute show on WFAN from 6:00 to 6:30 p.m., with an additional hour on Radio.com. Francesa announced that the show would be mostly freeform, saying that "I can do whatever I want. I don’t have to do sports. I can do politics. I can do whatever I want" in terms of content.

=== Third comeback and retirement ===
On January 6, 2020, Francesa debuted the first show in his new format, hosting a half-hour show on WFAN nights during the week while also hosting on Entercom's Radio.com platform. Francesa announced plans to branch out to more than New York sports, talking about national sports as well as political matters. On the first day of his new show, Francesa announced that his political coverage would be "played down the middle," claiming to provide an unbiased centrist perspective.

On March 24, 2020, Francesa returned to daytime sports radio at WFAN for the first time after his second retirement, taking a temporary weekend gig from 9:00 a.m. to 1:00 p.m. on Sundays. Downsizing at the station during the COVID-19 pandemic played a part in WFAN's decision to rehire Francesa. In May 2020, WFAN announced a revamp to its afternoon plans, scheduling Francesa for his first weekday show on the network since his second retirement with a 6:00–7:00 p.m. time window.

On July 24, 2020, Francesa retired from broadcasting his daily WFAN and Radio.com show for the third time, citing the desire to spend more time with his family.

== Post-retirement activities ==
Since retirement, Francesa has been podcasting with the BetRivers Network, hosting the Mike Francesa Podcast.

== Acting ==
Francesa played a bookie in the 2019 film Uncut Gems, starring Adam Sandler. He also had a role playing himself in the 2003 TV movie Undefeated.

== Personal life ==
Francesa's first marriage was in 1983, to a woman named Kate. They divorced in 1994.

Currently a resident of Manhasset, New York, Francesa married his second wife, Rosemary (whom he usually calls Roe), on July 14, 2000. They have three children, fraternal twins Emily Grace and Jack Patrick and Harrison James. In November 2019, Francesa bought a home in South Florida, reportedly to reduce his tax burden.

=== Political views ===
In April 2007, Francesa criticized Democratic presidential nominees Barack Obama and Hillary Clinton after they called for the resignation of Don Imus following comments that Imus had made about the Rutgers women's basketball team.

In 2016, Francesa supported Republican presidential candidate Donald Trump. He has expressed support for Trump's position on the national anthem at sporting events, tweeting that the "NFL has lost its way" by allowing players to kneel during the anthem. Francesa also brushed off reports that Trump's finances were in trouble, pointing out that he was still able to win the 2016 election.

Despite having voted for Trump, Francesa claimed in January 2020 that he would provide an "unbiased" moderate political perspective on his Radio.com show.

In March 2020, Francesa sharply criticized Trump's response to the COVID-19 pandemic.

=== Health ===
During the first week of June 2006, Francesa missed several days on the radio for what was termed as "personal reasons.” Soon after returning on June 8, 2006, he revealed that following medical tests he needed to change his diet because of his struggle with his weight. He also admitted to having an angioplasty procedure. Francesa underwent emergency knee surgery on August 31, 2006, to repair a shattered kneecap suffered during a golf game the previous day. On October 8, 2025, the Mike Francesa Podcast YouTube channel posted in a live chat room that Francesa had emergency gallbladder surgery that day.

=== Horse racing ===
Francesa owns horses through his JEH Racing Stable. In 2021, his two-year-old High Oak won the Grade II Saratoga Special Stakes. In 2022, in partnership with Lee Einsidler's LRE Racing, his horse Casa Creed won the Grade I Fourstardave Handicap at Saratoga. JEH Racing Stable is named for his children Jack, Emily and Harrison.

== Awards and criticism ==
In 2012, Mike Francesa was ranked first among the 100 most important sports-talk radio hosts in the U.S. by Talkers Magazine. Francesa credited colleagues at WFAN for his success, with a special salute to Russo. He remained the top sports-talk radio host by Talkers in 2013 and 2014. Francesa won the 2000 Marconi Award for Major Market Personality of the Year and won again in 2012.

New York Post columnist Phil Mushnick and Francesa have waged a long-running public battle, which has continued into 2022. At the root of Mushnick's dislike of Francesa is his perception of the latter's egotism, condescension, "know-it-all" attitude, and pomposity. He once accused Francesa and Chris Russo of being recorded demanding loyalty oaths from Jews after the September 11 attacks. Francesa has described Mushnick as a "jealous old man". Mushnick's counterpart at the New York Daily News, Bob Raissman, sounded similar themes in 2017 - but noted that Francesa's polarizing approach was what got so many listeners to tune in.
