= Chris Russo =

American sports radio personality (born 1959)

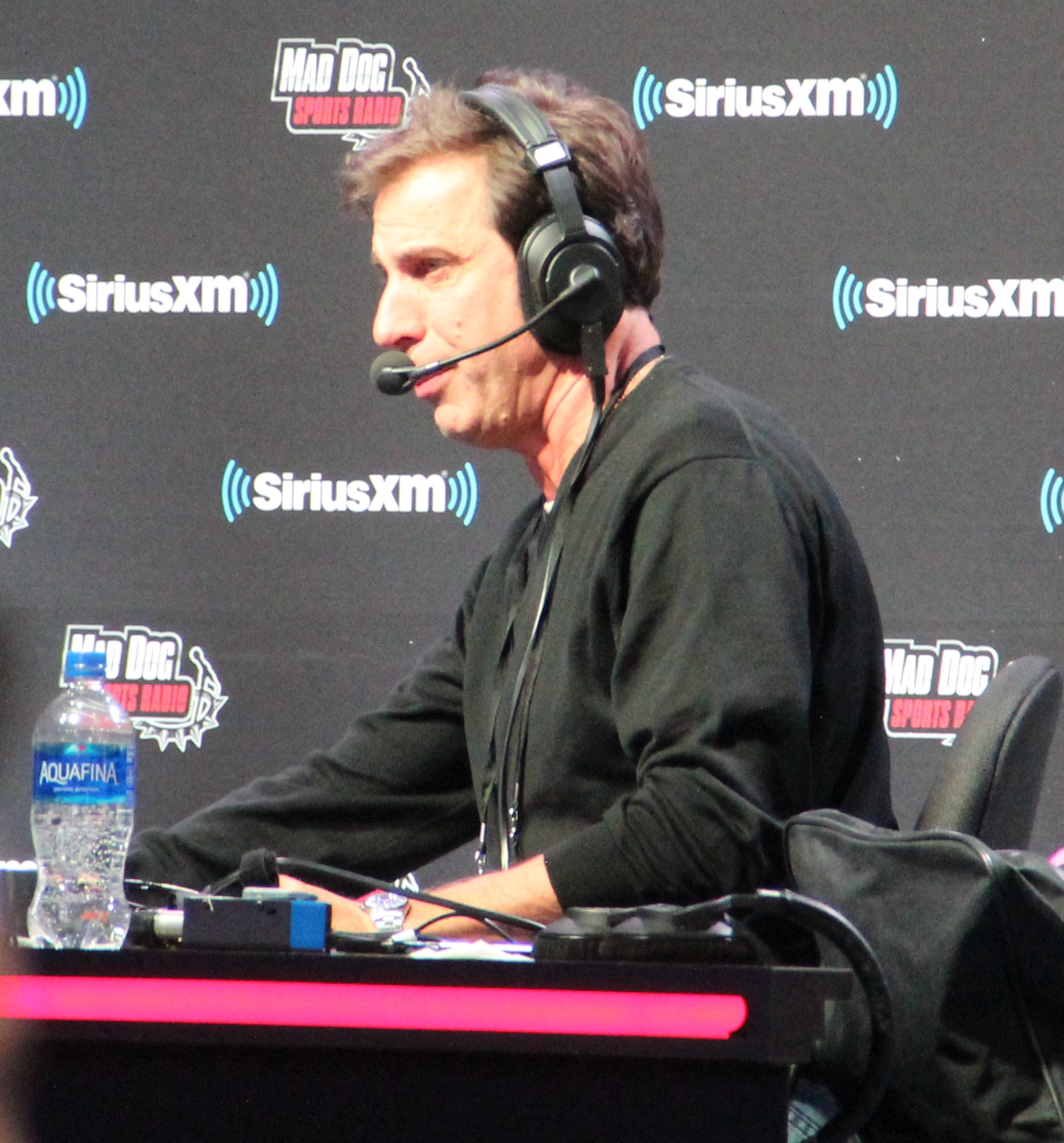
- Russo in 2019
- Born: October 18, 1959 (age 67); Syosset, New York, U.S.
- Education: Rollins College (BA)
- Years active: 1984–present
- Spouse: Jeanne Lavelle (m. 1995)
- Children: 4
- Presenting career
- Show: Mad Dog Unleashed
- Station: Sirius XM
- Time slot: 3 pm – 6 pm ET
- Style: Sports radio
- Country: American

Christopher Michael Russo (born October 18, 1959), also known as "Mad Dog", is an American sports radio personality best known as the former co-host of the Mike and the Mad Dog sports radio program with Mike Francesa, which was broadcast on WFAN in New York City and simulcasted on the YES Network. Russo joined Sirius XM Radio in August 2008 and operates his own channel, Mad Dog Sports Radio. He also hosts an afternoon radio show, Mad Dog Unleashed, SiriusXM Ch. 82 Mad Dog Sports Radio. Russo also joined MLB Network on March 31, 2014 and hosted his own show, High Heat, until 2024. He also frequently appears on ESPN’s First Take. Russo was inducted into the Radio Hall of Fame on November 1, 2022.

== Background ==
Russo was born in Syosset, New York on Long Island. He went to Darrow School in New Lebanon, New York, and Rollins College near Orlando, Florida graduating with a degree in history. He also spent one spring at the Cranleigh School south of London, England (Russo's mother is English) and in 1980, one semester at the University of Sydney in Australia studying Australian history and literature.

Prior to joining WFAN, Russo worked for WKIS in Orlando between 1984 and 1987 and WMCA in New York City between 1987 and 1988. During his career at WKIS, when it became clear that the people of Central Florida were having difficulty understanding his accent, the station sent him to speech therapy twice a week. He received the "Mad Dog" nickname from New York Daily News sports media critic Bob Raissman, who said Russo's approach to radio reminded him of former professional wrestler Maurice Vachon, who was also known as "Mad Dog."

Russo is known for his quick manner of speaking, his whistles, and his trademark greeting of "Good afternoon everybody!" at the start of the Mike and the Mad Dog show. George Vecsey of The New York Times described his voice as "a bizarre mixture of Jerry Lewis, Archie Bunker and Daffy Duck." Russo's voice was also described as "Donald Duck on steroids" by Don Imus.

== Career ==
=== Mike and the Mad Dog ===
Russo joined WFAN in December 1988 as an overnight, weekend, and fill-in host. Former WFAN Morning Show Host Don Imus brought Russo on board the Imus in the Morning show as the sports reporter. Imus also later helped promote Russo's nickname. By early 1989, his work on Imus led to Russo getting his own regular weekend show on Saturday Mornings. When Pete Franklin's drive time Show from 3 pm to 7 pm was not renewed by WFAN station management, WFAN paired up Russo with Mike Francesa, who at the time was a co-host on the mid-morning show. The show was dubbed Mike and the Mad Dog and officially launched on September 5, 1989, at 3 PM Eastern Time.

On August 14, 2008, Russo reached a mutual agreement with WFAN to release him out of the remainder of his contract. Russo insisted it was solely a personal decision and said, "This has nothing to do with Mike and I hating each other... This is about doing something different. I'm 48 years old and there are not going to be too many more opportunities to break away. It's time to try something else, but it was a tough decision to make." On August 15, 2008, Russo phoned Francesa on the show to say an emotional goodbye.

On October 16, 2009, Russo joined Francesa for a one-hour reunion show at Yankee Stadium, where both were scheduled to broadcast in adjacent booths. Francesa joined Russo on his Sirius XM show later in the day.

On March 30, 2016, Russo joined Francesa for a Mike and the Mad Dog reunion at Radio City Music Hall.

=== Mad Dog Unleashed ===
On August 19, 2008, Russo signed a five-year contract with SiriusXM Radio to headline a new sports talk channel called Mad Dog Radio on both Sirius and XM satellite radio. Russo hosts the channel's anchor program, Mad Dog Unleashed, live from Sirius's New York studios every weekday afternoon. Russo brought aboard long-time WINS anchor Steve Torre as the new program director of "Mad Dog Radio" and hired Bill Zimmerman (known on the air as "Billy Z") as the executive producer of his show. The show began airing daily on Sirius Channel 123 and XM Channel 144 on September 15, 2008. The show now airs on Sirius and XM Channel 82.

Russo said there was nothing WFAN could have done to keep him, after Sirius XM provided him his own channel, hosting American sports talk personalities. Russo's 5-year deal was worth approximately $3 million per year and Russo operates the channel himself, and hires the on-air staff.

On July 9, 2009, Russo reacted to his station being ranked outside the Top 100 stations on satellite radio by berating his entire staff, which included bringing on nighttime host Andy Gresh for an in-person dress-down. Russo concluded by firing his program director, Steve Torre. Torre was later re-hired and it is unknown if the incident was legitimate or a radio skit. On August 28, 2013, Russo announced that he had been signed by Sirius XM for three more years, commencing in September 2013.

Following Game 5 of the 2023 National League Championship Series with the Philadelphia Phillies leading the series 3–2, Russo predicted a Phillies' win on Mad Dog Radio and said that he would retire if the Arizona Diamondbacks won two consecutive games at Citizens Bank Park in Philadelphia to advance to the World Series. Diamondbacks manager Torey Lovullo, who said he is a friend of Russo, said that he "would love to see him quit" if the Diamondbacks won. Russo's promise reportedly caused a surge in support for the Diamondbacks among social media users. The day after the Diamondbacks defeated the Phillies in Game 7 to advance to the World Series, Russo appeared on The Howard Stern Show and reneged on his retirement vow, instead agreeing to walk around New York City wearing a Diamondbacks-themed bikini and a self-deprecating sign at the suggestion of Stern.

=== High Heat ===
Russo's Sirius XM deal also included daily hosting of an MLB Network TV show, High Heat, which began on March 31, 2014 and simulcasts on the MLB Network Radio channel of SiriusXM. He signed a new three-year contract, in September 2016. Russo renewed his contract for four more years, in April 2019. On February 15, 2021, Russo announced that the show's producer Bruce Schein, who appeared daily on-air, had been let go by MLB Network. After the 2024 MLB season, the show was cancelled by the network.

== Personal life ==
Russo is the only child of Anthony Michael "Tony" (1931–2013) and Vera "Molly" Russo, from Flushing, Queens and England, respectively. Russo married Jeanne Lavelle on May 6, 1995, and they have four children, Timmy, Kiera, Colin, and Patrick. Colin made his radio debut in his father's old time slot on WFAN on December 30, 2020, cohosting with Sonny Carton, son of long-time host, Craig Carton. Their daughter Kiera graduated from the University of Notre Dame with a degree in Film, Television, and Theatre, and now writes a Blog titled “A Penny For My Thoughts”. Russo resides in New Canaan, Connecticut and is a lifelong, avid San Francisco Giants fan.

== Published work ==
- Russo, Christopher; Allen St. John (2003). The Mad Dog 100 : The Greatest Sports Arguments of All Time. Doubleday. ISBN 0-385-50898-0.
- Russo, Christopher; Allen St. John (2006). The Mad Dog Hall of Fame: The Ultimate Top-Ten Rankings of the Best in Sports. Doubleday. ISBN 0-385-51746-7.
