= The Sean Hannity Show =

American talk radio show

- Genre: Conservative talk
- Running time: Weekdays: 3 hours (ET) (3:00 pm – 6:00 pm)
- Country of origin: United States
- Language: English
- Home station: WVNN, Athens, Alabama (1990–1992); WGST, Atlanta (1992–1996); WABC, New York City (1997–2014); WOR, New York City (2014–present)
- Syndicates: Premiere Networks; Westwood One
- TV adaptations: Hannity
- Hosted by: Sean Hannity
- Announcer: Scott Shannon
- Recording studio: Florida; New York City
- Original release: c. 1989
- Opening theme: "Comin' to Your City" by Big & Rich
- Website: hannity.com
- Podcast: hannity.com/podcasts/

The Sean Hannity Show (or simply Hannity) is a conservative talk radio show hosted by Sean Hannity. The program is broadcast live every weekday, from 3 p.m. to 6 p.m. ET. The show is produced in the New York City studios of radio station WOR and is transmitted via ISDN from Hannity's home in Florida, or on location if Hannity's commitments to Fox News Channel take him out of the New York area. The show is now syndicated by Premiere Networks, a subsidiary of iHeartMedia, on terrestrial radio affiliates across the United States, on Sirius XM Patriot channel 125. and on American Forces Network's AFN 360 PowerTalk and The Voice channels. The primary focus of the program is the politics of the day, with interviews of liberal and conservative commentators. After conservative radio show The Rush Limbaugh Show ended its run following Limbaugh's 2021 death, The Sean Hannity Show became the most-listened-to commercial radio talk show with an estimated 16.25 million listeners.

== Syndication ==
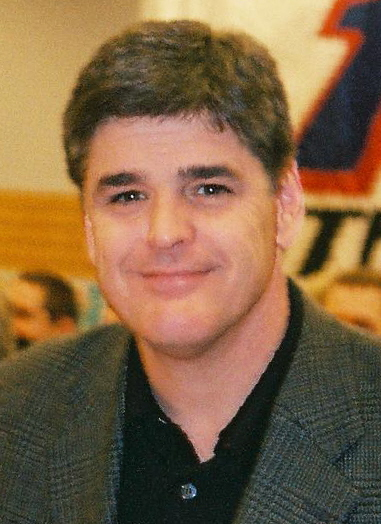
Show host Sean Hannity in 2004

Syndication began through the ABC Radio Networks on September 10, 2001, one day before the September 11 attacks. The program is carried on WSB in Atlanta, Georgia (second and third hours delayed three hours), KFYI in Phoenix, Arizona, WOKV in Jacksonville, Florida, WDTK in Detroit, WCBM in Baltimore, Maryland and WKRC in Cincinnati, Ohio, among others. The show is carried in most markets by a Citadel Broadcasting radio station; the show is owned by Citadel Broadcasting, which acquired the ABC Radio networks in 2006.

Hannity's first version of his radio show was in the late 1980s as a volunteer broadcaster for the University of California, Santa Barbara's radio station, KCSB-FM. He was dismissed from the station in 1989, following a controversial interview about AIDS in which he insulted a lesbian caller. Later, Hannity would bring his program to WVNN in Athens, Alabama and NewsRadio WGST in Atlanta, Georgia.

Hannity is carried on several hundred stations, and is the highest-rated talk program on many of them. He is a three-time consecutive winner of Radio & Records National Talk Show Host of The Year Award from 2003 to 2005. In 2004, Hannity signed a US$25 million, five-year contract extension with ABC Radio to continue the show through 2009; however, ABC Radio's acquisition by Citadel Broadcasting on June 12, 2007 gave Hannity an opportunity to leave one year after the acquisition.

In July 2008, it was announced that Hannity's show would be co-managed by Citadel's ABC Radio Networks and Premiere Radio Networks, a division of Clear Channel Communications. Premiere Radio would handle advertising sales and distribution to all non-Citadel owned stations, including Clear Channel-owned stations. Hannity already had agreements with approximately 80 Clear Channel stations in a separate agreement. The two networks would cooperate for special circumstances.

== Radio show ==
The show primarily features a mixture of monologues, conversations with callers, and interviews with those in the news.

=== Content ===
Hannity's frequent political targets initially included terrorism, illegal immigration, weapon of mass destruction in Iraq, and the Emergency Economic Stabilization Act of 2008. He frequently characterizes American liberalism as a movement more in line with democratic socialism than classical liberalism.

The show frequently features "man on the street" interviews (Man On The Street Thursday), where New York pedestrians are stopped and questioned about politics. Hannity will sometimes debate the answers with participants.

The show also features the occasional inclusion of behind the scenes staff, including producers Elisha, Lynda, "Sweet Baby" James, and animal-rights proponent "Flipper". "Gregster" is the engineer who typically plays the audio clips.

The show used to close daily with the segment "Trash the Lines" where calls were taken unscreened, with callers given approximately five seconds to say whatever they wanted. The segment, which had its roots in a late-night show Hannity hosted earlier in his career, has been used less frequently since the summer of 2006.

Following the election victory of Democrat Barack Obama, Hannity has hyperbolically referred to his show as "conservatism in exile", "the conservative resistance," "the conservative underground."

In the last 10 years he has consistently supported Donald Trump on the show.

=== The "Hate-Hannity Hotline" ===
Hannity provides a phone line for people who disagree with him to call in. He plays some of these clips at the beginning of the bottom half-hour segment of the show. He usually supplements these clips with the explanation that he is performing a service to the American people by "Absorbing the hate and bitterness of the angry left so that they will be nicer to you when you meet them along your way." This has appeared with less frequency in the radio show, though on the revamped Hannity on the Fox News Channel, this has become a regular segment (usually airing on Thursday).

=== Guest hosts ===
WABC personality Mark Levin frequently filled in for Hannity during the host's absence until Levin obtained his own syndicated program. Guest hosts have included Barry Farber, Mike Gallagher, Curtis Sliwa, Kirby Wilbur, Dennis Miller, and Mark Simone.

=== Guests on his show ===
The frequent guests on his radio show have included John McCain, Rudy Giuliani, Mike Huckabee, Newt Gingrich, Mitt Romney, Bobby Jindal, Fred Thompson and other politicians from both sides of the political aisle.

=== Book club ===
The Hannity show also has a book club with author interviews and discussions on topics. More recent books have included Strategery by Bill Sammon and Fight Back by G. Gordon Liddy. Hannity has also authored three New York Times bestsellers on politics and current events.

=== Show website ===
Hannity's website offers subscribers to the "Hannity Insider" subscription service live and recorded streaming audio of the program, available for download to an iPod or other MP3 player. In addition, the program was added to the Armed Forces Radio Network in December 2005. Audio streams of The Sean Hannity Show average more than 190,000 subscribed listeners per month. There is also Hannidate, a chat room for conservative singles, both heterosexual and gay. The website also includes a forum to discuss political topics. Respectful conversation and debate is encouraged.

== See also ==
- Alan Colmes
- Hannity
- Hannity & Colmes
- Hannity's America
