= WFAN (AM) =

Clear-channel sports radio station in New York City

- New York, New York; United States
- Broadcast area: New York metropolitan area
- Frequency: 660 kHz
- Branding: WFAN Sports Radio 66 and 101.9 FM, The Fan

Programming
- Language: English
- Format: Sports radio
- Affiliations: BetMGM Network; Brooklyn Nets; New Jersey Devils; New York Giants; New York Yankees; Rutgers Scarlet Knights; Westwood One Sports

Ownership
- Owner: Audacy, Inc.; (Audacy License, LLC)
- Sister stations: WCBS-FM; WFAN-FM; WHSQ; WINS; WINS-FM; WNEW-FM; WXBK

History
- First air date: May 1922
- Former call signs: WEAF (1922–1946); WNBC (1946–1954, 1960–1988); WRCA (1954–1960)
- Call sign meaning: Sports fan

Technical information
- Licensing authority: FCC
- Facility ID: 28617
- Class: A (Clear channel)
- Power: 50,000 watts (unlimited)
- Transmitter coordinates: 40°51′35.36″N 73°47′7.48″W (main); 40°51′35″N 73°47′12″W; (aux)
- Repeaters: 101.9 WFAN-FM (New York); SiriusXM channel 94

Links
- Public license information: Public file; LMS
- Webcast: Listen live (via Audacy)
- Website: www.audacy.com/wfan

WFAN (660 AM) is a commercial radio station licensed to serve New York City, with a sports radio format, branded "Sports Radio 66 AM and 101.9 FM" or "The Fan". Owned by Audacy, Inc., the station serves the New York metropolitan area, while its 50,000-watt clear channel signal can be heard at night throughout much of the eastern United States and Canada. WFAN is also heard nationwide via SiriusXM satellite radio (channel 94). WFAN's studios are located in the Hudson Square neighborhood of lower Manhattan and its transmitter is sited on High Island in the Bronx.

The current WFAN, and its sports format, is the second New York City station with that call sign and programming. The original WFAN was launched on July 1, 1987, on 1050 AM, as the world's first radio station to adopt the sports radio format around-the-clock.

The callsign WFAN and sports format were moved to the former WNBC on 660 kHz on October 7, 1988. WNBC's history dated to 1922, when it began operation as WEAF, licensed to Western Electric. Purchased by the Radio Corporation of America in 1926, it became the flagship of the NBC Radio Network, the first national radio network in the United States, later becoming WRCA and WNBC.

== Founding by AT&T ==
=== Early AT&T radio development ===
The American Telephone & Telegraph Company (AT&T) had an early interest in radiotelephone development, although initially only as a method for establishing telephone links to locations where it was not possible to string wire lines. Lee de Forest's development of vacuum-tube amplification would prove invaluable for progress in a number of areas. In July 1913 the company spent $50,000 to purchase from the inventor the patent rights for telephone wire amplification, and in 1915 used this innovation to make the first transcontinental telephone calls. In October 1914, the company further purchased the commercial patent rights for radio signalling for $90,000, and in October 1915 conducted test radio transmissions from the Navy's station in Arlington, Virginia, NAA, that were heard as far away as Paris, France and Hawaii.

AT&T's main competitor in the radio field would be the Radio Corporation of America (RCA), which was formed in 1919 as a subsidiary of General Electric (GE). Because no single company held sufficient patents rights to operate radio systems without infringing on other company's patents, a series of cross-licensing agreements were concluded between companies holding key patents, and on July 1, 1920, AT&T signed a comprehensive agreement with GE. These agreements effectively assigned dominance in specified areas of the radio industry to individual companies, which eventually would meet with anti-trust challenges. In addition, conflicting interpretations of some of the pact's clauses by the signatories would lead to numerous disputes, especially between AT&T and the other participants, known collectively as the "radio group".

On December 1, 1921, the U.S. Department of Commerce, which regulated radio at this time, adopted a regulation formally establishing a broadcasting station category, which set aside the wavelength of 360 meters (833 kHz) for entertainment broadcasts, and 485 meters (619 kHz) for market and weather reports. AT&T soon recognized that it had the technical expertise and patent rights needed to play an important, and possibly dominant, role in the broadcasting industry. A December 1921 memo, prepared by AT&T engineers Harley C. Lauderback and John F. Bratney, proposed that the company construct a nationwide radio network, using the company's long lines to connect together individual stations. They also noted that "this service would enable the national and local advertisers, industrial institutions of all kinds, and even individuals if they desire, to send forth information and advertising matter audibly to thousands". AT&T moved quickly to start implementing this plan, and on February 11, 1922, formally announced its intention to develop a "national chain of radio transmitting stations".

A key component was the construction by AT&T of a well equipped New York City station. In early 1922 an experimental station, 2XY, was built atop the AT&T "Long Lines" building at 24 Walker Street. On April 29, 1922, the Walker Street station was issued a broadcasting station license, for operation on 360 meters, with the call sign of WBAY. On May 19 a second New York City broadcasting station, also on 360 meters, was licensed to the Western Electric Company, an AT&T subsidiary located at 463 West Street, with the call letters WDAM. Ten days later, this call sign was changed to WEAF. All of these call signs were randomly assigned from a sequential roster of available call letters, although at the time it was noted that WEAF matched the entrance artwork at AT&T headquarters at 195 Broadway, which depicted the four classical elements of water, earth, air and fire.

The original plan was that AT&T would not originate any programming of its own, and instead would rent WBAY out for commercial use, $40 for 15 minutes daytime, $50 during evenings, which, using an existing telephone term, was called "toll" broadcasting. However, initially there was very little interest in this idea, and to begin service the company had to start broadcasting its own programs. The debut broadcast over WBAY, of recorded music, took place on July 25, 1922, its signal was found to be weaker than expected, so on August 16, 1922, broadcasting operations were transferred to the WEAF transmitter located at West Street. It was later reported that the first WEAF broadcast included the singer Marguerite Dunlap.

On August 28, 1922, WEAF broadcast its first sponsored program, a roughly 10-minute-long talk anticipating today's radio and television infomercials. This promoted an apartment development in Jackson Heights near a new elevated subway line (the IRT's Flushing-Corona line, now the number 7 line). Although often credited as the first radio commercial, there are reports that a few other stations had already quietly carried paid programs.

In September 1922 the Department of Commerce set aside a second entertainment wavelength, 400 meters (750 kHz) for "Class B" stations that had quality equipment and programming. Both WBAY and WEAF were assigned to this wavelength.

The original issues with the weak WBAY transmissions from 24 Walker Street were eventually solved, and AT&T returned to that site as its primary transmitter location. Because the WEAF call sign was now well-known, the two stations swapped call signs on May 12, 1923, with WBAY becoming WEAF, and WEAF becoming WBAY. Because of this, FCC records list WFAN's "First License" as April 29, 1922, which is when the first license was issued for WBAY at Walker Street. (The new WBAY later became WECO, and was deleted on November 6, 1924).

Effective May 15, 1923, additional "Class B" assignments were made available, with New York City-Newark allocated three frequencies, including 610 kHz, and WBAY and WEAF were reassigned to this new frequency.

=== Network operations and the "WEAF chain" ===
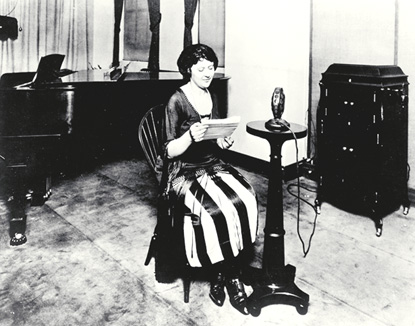
Helen Hahn in the WEAF studio, 1922.

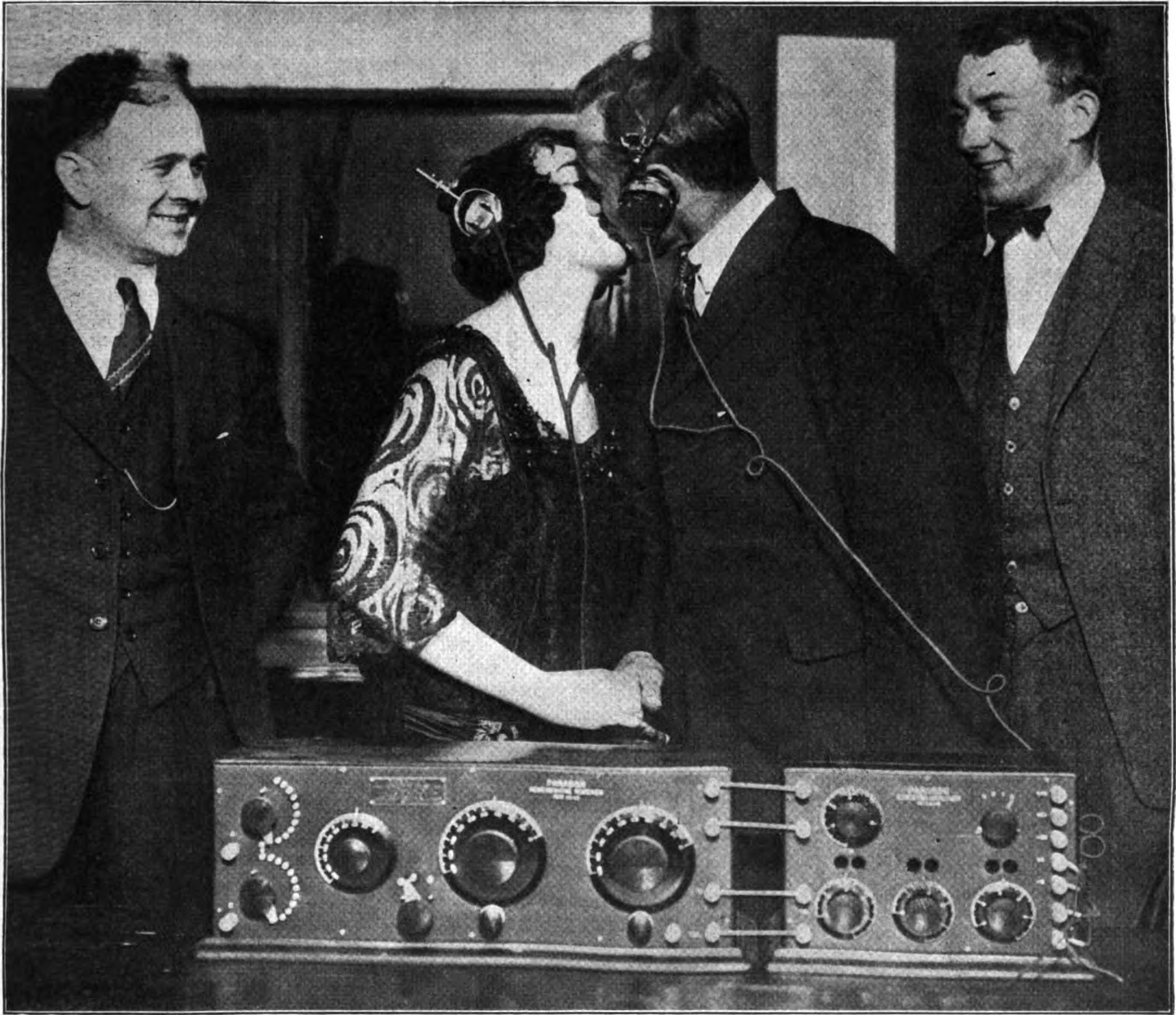
WEAF broadcasting Margaret Girstner and Joseph Woorm's wedding, 1923.

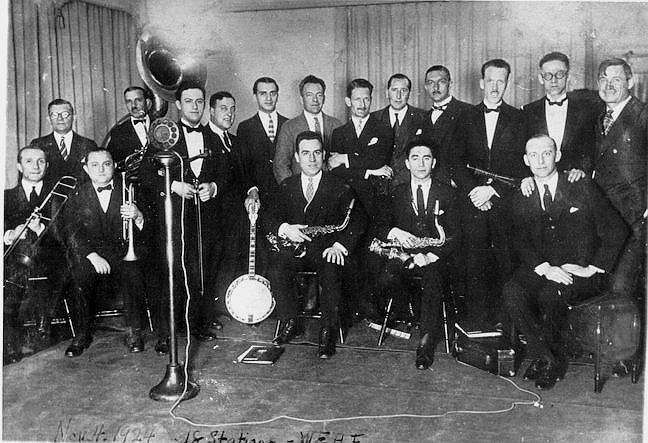
The Eveready Hour's election night broadcast from WEAF to 18 stations on November 4, 1924: Will Rogers (far right), Art Gillham, Wendell Hall, Carson Robison, Eveready Quartet, Graham McNamee and the Waldorf-Astoria Dance Orchestra.

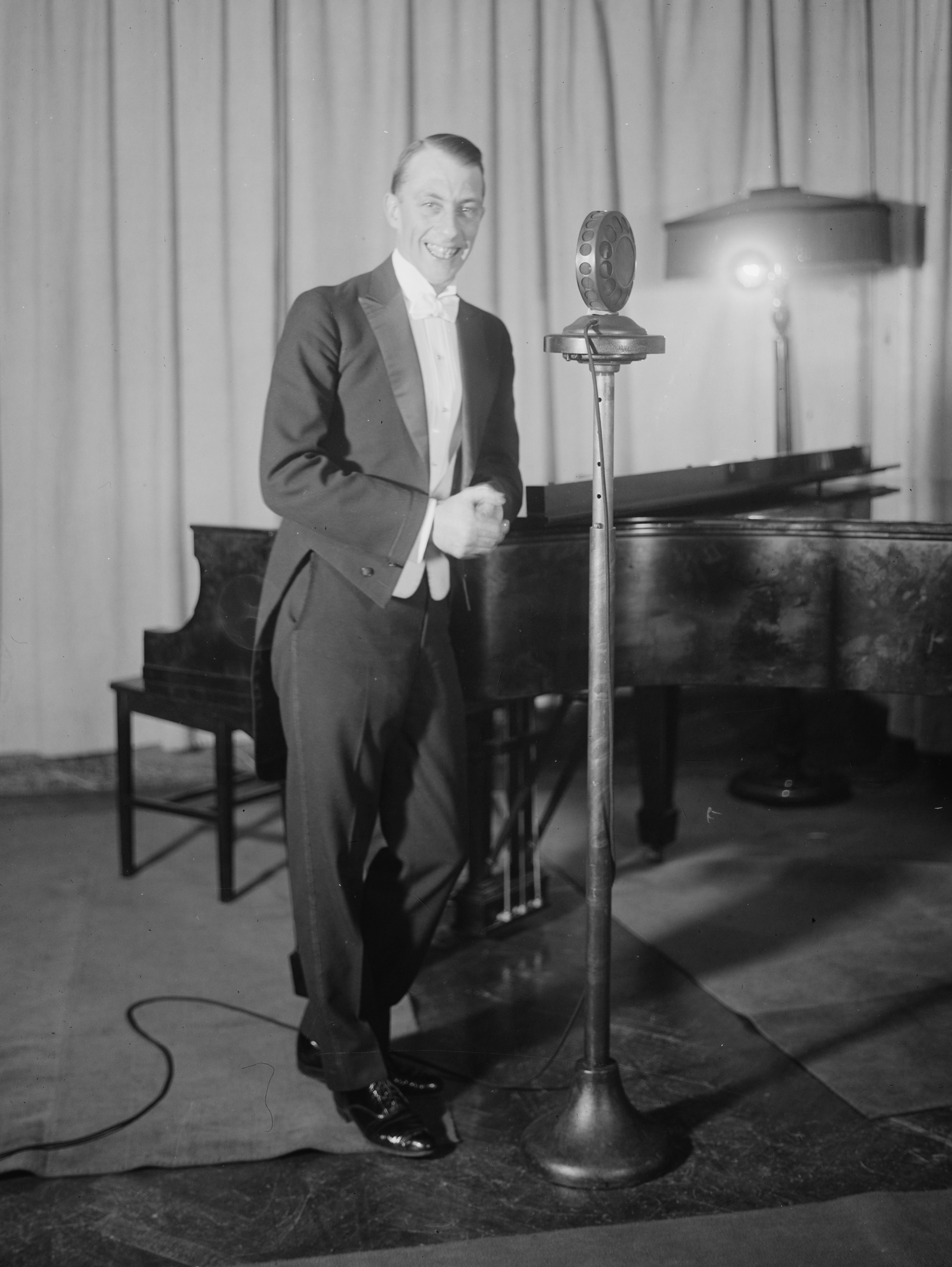
Graham McNamee in the WEAF studio, 1925.

WEAF's first network program was transmitted on January 4, 1923, using dedicated telephone lines to link to one additional station, WNAC in Boston, Massachusetts. A more ambitious three-month link began operation on July 1, 1923, when Colonel Edward H. R. Green arranged for AT&T to provide WEAF's programming for rebroadcast by his station, WMAF in South Dartmouth, Massachusetts. The summer of 1923 also saw the opening of WCAP in Washington, D.C., licensed to the Chesapeake and Potomac Telephone Company, an AT&T subsidiary. The resulting New York-to-Washington link was extensively used to gain engineering knowledge in using telephone lines for radio network connections.

Initially the WEAF network had few advertisers, so most of its schedule consisted of unsponsored "sustaining" programs which network stations had to pay for, although they were not charged for sponsored programs. An important early sponsored program was The Eveready Hour, which debuted over WEAF in December 1923, and began to be carried over a rapidly growing number of stations in early 1924. The first transcontinental link was made in early 1924, and that fall a coast-to-coast network of 23 stations broadcast a speech by President Coolidge. By the end of 1925 there were 26 affiliates in the standard WEAF chain network, extending westward to Kansas City, Missouri.

Reacting to AT&T's innovations, RCA began efforts to establish its own network, originating from its New York City station, WJZ, but was badly handicapped in competing effectively. AT&T maintained that the cross-licensing agreements gave it the exclusive right to sell airtime. AT&T also normally refused access to its high-quality telephone lines to competitors, so RCA's efforts generally used telegraph lines to connect stations, which would prove to have inadequate fidelity and reliability. RCA also investigated using high-powered or shortwave stations to establish network connections, but none of these alternatives matched the quality of AT&T's telephone links. Thus, while President Coolidge's March 1925 inauguration was sent over a growing AT&T transcontinental network of 23 stations, the WJZ chain's broadcast of the speech was carried by only four stations, all located in the East.

=== Formation of the Broadcasting Company of America ===
On May 11, 1926, AT&T announced that "The radio broadcasting activities heretofore carried on by the radio broadcasting department of the American Telephone and Telegraph Company, under the general designation of WEAF, will be incorporated under the name Broadcasting Company of America." Unpublicized at the time were ongoing intense negotiations between AT&T and the radio group companies, led by RCA, about the status of the cross-licensing agreements, and the overall future of the broadcasting industry. AT&T's consolidation of its radio activities into the BCA subsidiary allowed for two possible outcomes: if AT&T decided to withdraw, then the transfer of its radio operations would be simplified, otherwise, the new entity could continue to be run semi-independently of the parent corporation.

During BCA's short existence, the standard WEAF chain configuration consisted of 17 stations, concentrated in the northeastern United States, but also extending westward to WDAF in Kansas City, Missouri. Individual evening hourly station rates ranged from $170 for three stations located in smaller communities to $480 for flagship WEAF. The standard charge for an hour of evening programming over the entire roster of stations was $4,080, before any applicable discounts.

=== BCA sale to the Radio Corporation of America ===
Although the WEAF network operations were profitable, AT&T ultimately decided it was best to withdraw from radio broadcasting. The result was a total of twelve agreements, dated July 1, 1926, but signed six days later, between AT&T and the radio group companies. Included was the sale of BCA's assets, principally WEAF and its associated chain operations, to RCA for $1 million. A Consolidated Press Association wire service review of the transaction noted that the sum paid reflected WEAF's position in the industry, as it represented a substantial premium over what other radio stations were commanding in the marketplace, and estimated that 4/5ths of the purchase price for WEAF represented good-will and the securing of the use of AT&T's lines.

The sale was initially kept secret from the staff and the general public, and did not become publicly known until July 21. AT&T's press release announcing the sale stated that although operation of WEAF and the WEAF chain had been financially successful, the company had concluded that "while the technical principle was similar to that of the telephone system, the objective of the broadcasting station was quite different from that of a telephone system. Consequently, it has seemed to us after years of experimentation, that the broadcasting station which we have built up might be more suitably operated by other interests."

== NBC era ==
On September 13, 1926, RCA's chairman of the board Owen D. Young and president James G. Harbord announced the formation of the National Broadcasting Company, Inc. (NBC), to begin operations upon RCA's acquisition of WEAF on November 15. WEAF became the flagship of the NBC Red Network, which sometimes would still be referred to as the WEAF chain, while WJZ became the originator of the NBC Blue Network.

On November 11, 1928, the Federal Radio Commission implemented a major reallocation under the provisions of its General Order 40. This introduced frequencies reserved for "clear channel" stations, and WEAF was assigned exclusive nighttime operation on 660 kHz.

In 1941, the Federal Communications Commission (FCC) forced RCA give up one of its radio networks, citing antitrust concerns, by announcing that it would no longer license radio stations that were affiliated with an organization operating more than one network. This ruling was upheld by the U.S. Supreme Court two years later, and RCA decided to keep the flagship station WEAF and the Red Network, which was rebranded as the NBC Radio Network after the Blue Network was divested, along with several stations (including WJZ), to Edward J. Noble. The Blue Network was renamed the American Broadcasting Company (ABC).

WEAF's call letters were changed to WNBC in 1946, then to WRCA in 1954, and back to WNBC in 1960. The decline of scripted network radio programming in the late 1950s saw the station gradually relaunched into a middle-of-the-road musical format.

=== 1960s ===
By the early 1960s, the station gradually switched from NBC network programs to more local-oriented programs and adjusted its music policy from traditional standards to incorporate more popular hits while staying away from harder rock and roll. In 1964, it adopted a talk format, the first in New York radio. Hosts included genial morning-drive companion Big Wilson, The Tonight Show Starring Johnny Carson announcer Ed McMahon, New York–based actor Robert Alda, NBC Radio comedian/satirist Mort Sahl, the witty mid-morning game-show host ("Fortune Phone") Sterling Yates, late-morning talk radio provocateur Joe Pyne, midday voices Lee Leonard and later Jim Gearhart, sports talk host Bill Mazer, plus late-nighters Brad Crandall (later of NFL Films) and Long John Nebel.

On weekends, WNBC aired almost all of the NBC Radio Network's Monitor program, which featured many of WNBC's own hosts as well as the already established lineup holding court at NBC's Radio Central (Gene Rayburn, Henry Morgan, Bill Cullen, David Wayne, Kitty Carlisle and Wayne Howell). Later in the decade, WNBC shed its "Conversation Station" format and readopted a middle-of-the-road (MOR) music format, covering songs from the 1940s to the 1960s with non-rock and soft rock hits recorded after 1955. The format would feature such artists as Frank Sinatra, Elvis Presley, Nat "King" Cole, The Everly Brothers, Tom Jones, The 5th Dimension, Peggy Lee, and Dionne Warwick.

Hosts during this transition back to music included Wilson, Jack Spector (formerly of WMCA), Jack Hayes, Charlie Brown and later Ted Brown, hired away from then-dominant MOR station WNEW. Well-known MOR host and vocalist Jim Lowe joined WNBC for a time during one of his many shuttles to and from WNEW. Former WMCA morning man Joe O'Brian joined WNBC during this time. By 1971, music from such acts as Sinatra and Cole would disappear, with a few exceptions, separating WNBC from its WNEW-like beginnings while WNEW also began to also move away from the more traditional artists as well (only for them to return to a more traditional Big Band format 10 years later).

=== Adult contemporary relaunch ===
Don Imus was hired in November 1971, giving New York its first exposure to the shock jock genre. Imus stayed with the station for most of the next two decades, except for a couple of years in the late 1970s when there was a general purge of the air staff and a short-term format flip to a music-intensive top 40 approach. Despite somewhat different formats, WNBC saw itself as a mostly unsuccessful competitor to New York top 40 powerhouse WABC. Thus, they brought in Murray "the K" Kaufman in 1972, and Wolfman Jack opposite WABC's Bruce "Cousin Brucie" Morrow in 1973. This did not improve ratings much. By 1973, WNBC was a mainstream top 40-leaning adult contemporary music radio station featuring The Carpenters, Paul Simon, Carole King, The Stylistics, Neil Diamond, James Taylor, and other artists of that era. They also began to play more 1960s-era rock and roll oldies, including the Motown artists, The Beatles, The Beach Boys, and The Rolling Stones, at that point.

Ted Brown would leave in the early 1970s and return to WNEW. In 1974, NBC Radio's new president, Jack G. Thayer, formerly of WGAR in Cleveland, hired John Lund from WNEW to be program director. Then, WNBC hired Bruce Morrow away from WABC to take over the evening shift. In addition to Imus in the morning, Lund moved Cousin Brucie to middays, hired Bob Vernon ("Vernon with a V") for afternoons, Oogie Pringle for early evenings, and Dick Summer for late nights. Other new DJs included Norm N. Nite, who arrived from WCBS-FM in 1975. Lund departed the following year, while Joe McCoy was hired. Mel Phillips was program director at the time of McCoy's hiring. By 1975, WNBC was playing an Adult Top 40 format, trying to compete with WABC. The station's playlist featured hits from 1964 to then-current music. By this time, artists such as the Eagles, Billy Joel, Steve Miller, Fleetwood Mac, Bee Gees, Donna Summer, and disco acts, among others, were mixed in. Unfortunately, despite or because of the continuous tweaking of WNBC's format, the station remained in the second tier of New York stations.

In 1977, Bob Pittman was hired as WNBC's new Program Director, replacing Mel Phillips. His first decision was to lay-off all of the station's personalities, some of which were veterans (including Don Imus, Cousin Brucie, Norm N. Nite and Joe McCoy), replacing them with younger-sounding disc jockeys from Boston and medium markets. He also shifted the format from adult top 40 or hot AC to a more aggressively current-based top 40 format, with occasional nods to FM radio (such as commercial-free hours). As a result of this tweaking, the station was now playing artists such as Andy Gibb, KC and the Sunshine Band, Boston, Peter Frampton, Fleetwood Mac, the Eagles, Billy Joel and the Bee Gees, among others. However, listenership actually went down, and while some of the new air personalities would find success (Johnny Dark, Frank Reed, and Allen Beebe would be heard on the station well into the 1980s), others would not (Ellie Dylan, who replaced Imus in morning drive, would be gone within months). By 1979, Pittman would leave WNBC (he would soon become the founder of MTV), John Lund was hired back as program director (from KHOW in Denver), and Imus returned to the morning show. Under program director John Lund, WNBC's playlist was tweaked back to an adult top 40 format, and ratings increased by 50% to surpass WABC by the summer of 1980.

=== "The Next One" ===
In the early 1980s, WNBC continued as an adult-leaning Top 40 radio station. The best days of WNBC were from the fall of 1980 until the fall of 1983, when the station was consistently in or near the top 5. When Lund returned as program director in late 1979, WNBC general manager Robert Sherman set the goal: "Beat WABC", which had been New York's No. 1 station for decades. Lund launched the "Twice as Many" contest promoting "twice the music, twice the prizes, and twice as many chances to win". As New York's No. 2 station (behind WABC), "WNBC had to be twice as good to be #1". WNBC promotion director Dale Pon (who later created the successful "I Want My MTV" campaign) created its slogan "The Next One", meaning that it would be the number-one ranked AM music station in New York City. As part of that campaign, TV commercials and subway boards softened the image of the cantankerous Don Imus by including two cute twin blonde little girls saying "We're #2" and blanketing the New York City metro area.

When an Arbitron report was released that WNBC believed confirmed that it was in fact the most popular AM music radio station in New York City, the slogan was changed to "The New One". Also in 1980, to differentiate its call letter similarity with WABC, Lund got Imus and other talents to over-emphasize the letter N when saying the station name: "66 W-NNNN-B-C". Within a year, Imus was No. 1 in the morning and WNBC surpassed WABC in Arbitron ratings. WNBC added American Top 40 with Casey Kasem late in 1980. In reality, WABC's ratings had begun to nosedive in 1978–79, and by the time WNBC beat them in 1980, it was only good enough for sixth place in the market (behind WBLS, WKTU, WOR, WCBS-FM and WRFM).

In 1981, John Lund left WNBC to begin his consulting and research firm in San Francisco, and the station's assistant PD R.E. "Buzz" Brindle served as interim program director until Kevin Metheny was hired in the late Spring. WNBC began moving to an AC format similar to sister station WYNY. With the shift, hard rock songs were eliminated during the day; at night, the station was slightly hotter, playing a limited number of rock songs. At that time, WNBC and WYNY were sort of fraternal twin stations (playing identical types of music but presented differently, and their music mix was somewhat different for both current and gold songs). By summer 1982, WNBC was near the top with some of their best ratings ever. On August 8, 1982, WNBC added C-QUAM AM stereo.

Once WABC switched to their present-day all-talk format on May 10, 1982, WNBC added a few rock songs that were not heard on any AC stations in the area. In the fall of 1982, to much fanfare, Long Island native Howard Stern was brought in from WWDC-FM in Washington, D.C., to do afternoon drive. Initially, Stern played a considerable amount of music, much to his dismay, though his ratings were high. Then, in 1983, with ABC-owned WPLJ evolving to a Contemporary hit radio (CHR) format, as well as WHTZ's debut with the same format, WNBC began to lose some listeners. WNBC lost American Top 40 to WPLJ in November 1983. The station performed well through 1984.

In the spring of 1985, Dale Parsons took over as program director. After that, Stern cut down his music load, eventually playing only four songs an hour and began to talk much more. In overnights beginning in the spring of 1984, WNBC added taped Wolfman Jack shows which featured oldies from the 1960s with some 1950s and early 1970s music, with current and 80's hits mixed into rotation and pre-recorded voice tracks of Wolfman Jack announcing the songs, making the show sound live.

=== Decline of WNBC ===
On September 30, 1985, Howard Stern was terminated abruptly, supposedly due to corporate pressure. In Private Parts, Stern detailed how WNBC management expected that his last day would be September 26, and that Stern would not go in to work on September 27 due to Hurricane Gloria. However, Stern went in, and because there was no station management on hand, Stern did his show as normal, refusing to cover the problems related to the storm. Ironically, he spent much of the show insisting that he was leaving the station, because he had learned that Soupy Sales had signed a syndication contract that had long been withheld from Stern.

After Stern's dismissal and subsequent debut on then-rival New York station WXRK, WNBC's ratings plummeted, and they were under a two-share by the spring of 1986. Initially, they played a bit more music and then went through several temporary afternoon hosts. Afternoons were back to about 12 songs per hour. The music was more of a gold-based adult contemporary format with many oldies and moderate amounts of current product. In the spring of 1986, Joey Reynolds moved into afternoons with a talk-intensive show while playing six songs an hour. Wolfman Jack was dropped in overnights in favor of various weekend announcers playing the regular AC rotation. Weekends had Bill Grundfest doing a talk intensive show a few hours each day playing six songs an hour. Despite these changes, by the fall of 1986, WNBC was in a ratings crisis.

At approximately 4:42 p.m. on October 22, 1986, the station's "N-Copter" traffic helicopter crashed into the Hudson River, killing traffic reporter Jane Dornacker and severely injuring pilot Bill Pate. As WNBC listeners heard Dornacker giving her traffic report, she stopped abruptly as a grinding noise could be heard in the background. Dornacker then screamed in terror, "Hit the water! Hit the water! Hit the water!", as the radio transmission was suddenly cut off and a very shaken Joey Reynolds, working as radio host, awkwardly tried to figure out what had happened by saying "Okay, we're going to play some music here, I think". Dornacker had returned to flying in a helicopter after surviving a previous crash of the N-Copter into the Hackensack River in New Jersey a few months earlier on April 18, 1986.

WNBC had a turnover of programming in early 1987. On February 23, the music-intensive AC mix with various people was dropped on overnights in favor of Alan Colmes, who would also do a talk intensive show and only six songs per hour. On February 27, 1987, Joey Reynolds' show was ended and Bill Grundfest temporarily moved into this time slot. On March 9, 1987, Alan Colmes moved to afternoons and continued to play four songs per hour. Joey Reynolds did not run his own board and had Big Jay Sorensen as his producer and board operator. Since Colmes ran his own board, Sorensen moved to the overnight shift and did a music intensive show. This show was now marketed as The Time Machine, playing oldies from 1955 to 1974 (emphasizing 1964–1969), complete with old jingles and an echo effect, resulting in a sound similar to WABC's during its Top 40 heyday. Two weeks later, on March 23, 1987, Soupy Sales had found out that there were plans to end his show; at that point, he walked off midway through with Dale Parsons finishing the show. Weekender and assistant programming director Jim Collins moved into that time slot with a gold-based music intensive show on a temporary basis. Then, on April 6, 1987, a couple weeks after Soupy Sales left, his former sidekick Ray D'Ariano moved back into the 10 am to 2 pm weekday time slot, but was now playing 1955–73 oldies while focusing on 1964–69. His show was music intensive, playing about 12 oldies an hour.

In the summer of 1987, WNBC considered going all oldies, running The Time Machine full-time, with the exception of Knicks and Rangers games, and Imus in the Morning. Instead, they increased the amount of oldies programming, but not on a full-time basis. Therefore, WNBC modified their format, keeping Imus in the morning, playing a few AC cuts and a couple oldies an hour with his usual talk. Alan Colmes continued hosting the afternoon drive talk show, but dropped music altogether. In evenings, Dave Sims continued with sports talk along with Knicks and Rangers games. The Time Machine remained on overnights, but was now expanded to full-time on weekends with hosts Dan Taylor (laid off from WHN when they became WFAN), "Big" Jay Sorensen, "The Real" Bob James, Jim Collins, Lee Chambers, Dale Parsons, Carol Mason and others. Ray D'Ariano continued his midday weekday oldies show, but was not part of the "Time Machine" programming. His show had newer WNBC jingles, no echo sound effects, and slightly softer songs. From the Summer of 1987 to the station's demise on October 7, 1988, WNBC's format was classified as Adult Contemporary, but they only played adult contemporary cuts during Imus's show. The actual format was block programming featuring AC and talk in morning drive; all-oldies on Middays, overnights, and weekends; talk on weekday afternoons; and sports talk weekday evenings and whenever the Knicks or Rangers played a game. It was difficult to classify WNBC's format at that point.

=== The launch of sports radio on 1050 ===
At 3:00 p.m. on July 1, 1987, Emmis Communications-owned WFAN signed on at 1050 kHz, replacing country music station WHN, and billing itself as the world's first 24-hour-per-day sports talk station. (The WFAN call sign was suggested by the wife of "The Fan's" first program director, John Chanin.) The first live voice heard on WFAN was that of Suzyn Waldman, with a sports update, followed by the first show, which was hosted by Jim Lampley. Waldman reported for the station, covering the New York Yankees and New York Knicks for 14 years. Other hosts besides Lampley during WFAN's fifteen months at 1050 kHz included Bill Mazer, Pete Franklin, Greg Gumbel, Art Shamsky, and Ed Coleman. Ann Liguori is also one of the original hosts and was the first woman to host a show on the station. "Hey Liguori, What's the Story" aired the first weekend the station was on the air in 1987 and continued until 2008. WFAN also inherited broadcast rights to the defending World Series champion New York Mets from WHN, who had held the rights since 1983; Mets games stayed on WFAN until 2013.

=== WFAN moves to 660 ===
Final WNBC logo, used from 1986 to 1988

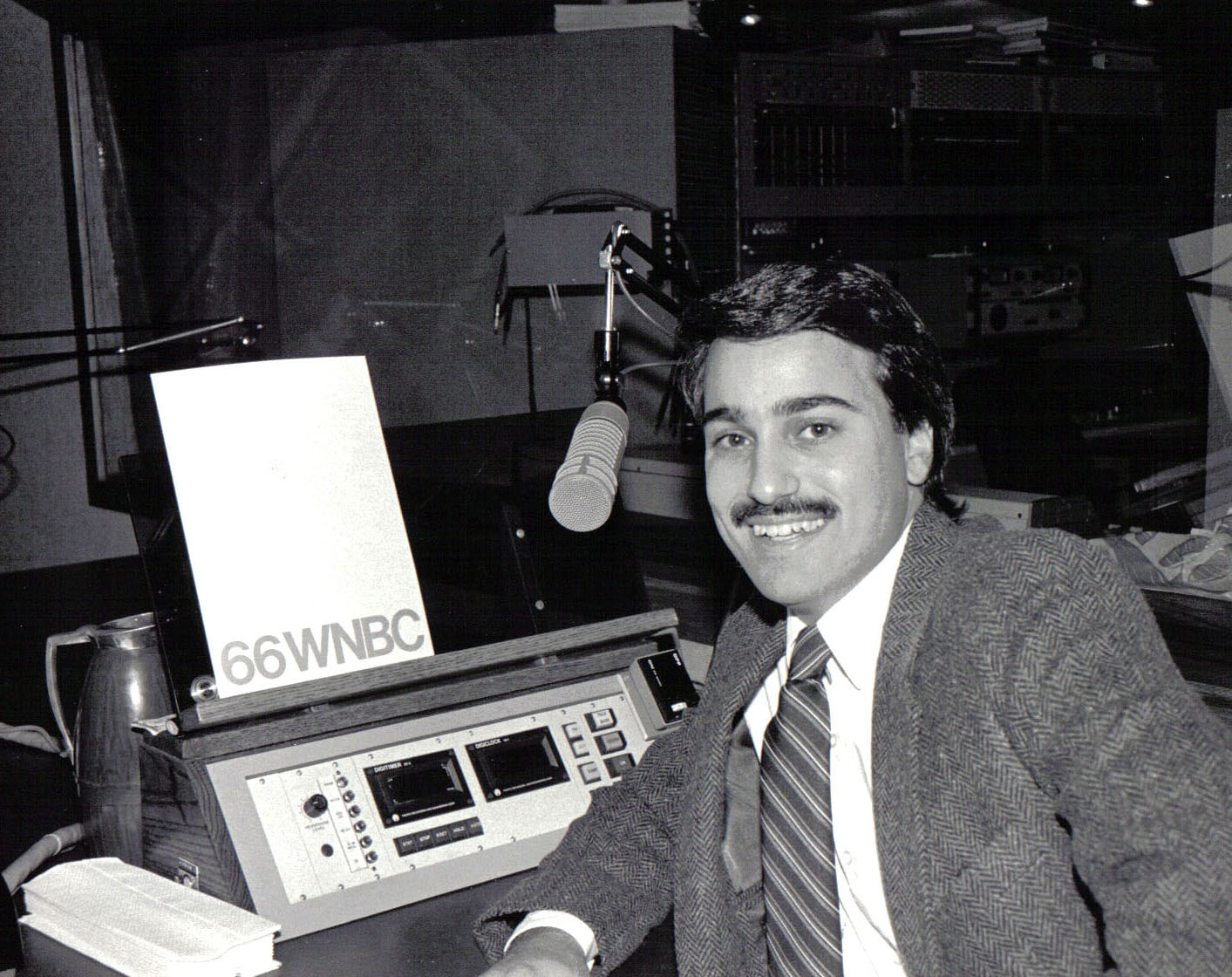
Frank Cipolla at WNBC, 1988.

In early 1988, General Electric (GE), which owned NBC through its purchase of RCA two years earlier, announced that it would close NBC's radio division and sell its owned-and-operated stations. In February of that year, GE made a multi-station deal with Emmis; in New York City, the WNBC license for 660 was included in the sale. On October 7, 1988, at 5:30 pm, WFAN changed frequencies to replace WNBC at 660 kHz. The last voice heard on WNBC was that of Alan Colmes, who counted down the seconds to WNBC's demise with the NBC chimes (the notes G-E-C) playing in the background.

In the complicated switch that saw WFAN move to the 660 frequency, the 1050 frequency that was formerly the home of WFAN became that of Spanish-language WUKQ, owned by Spanish Broadcasting System (SBS). However, SBS already owned an AM station in the market, Newark, New Jersey–based WSKQ at 620 kHz. In those days, FCC rules stipulated that companies could own only one AM station per market. As a result, SBS received a temporary waiver to run 1050 while exploring the sale of either AM frequency. SBS chose to keep 620, and 1050 was traded to Forward Communications, which owned WEVD, then at 97.9 FM. After that deal was approved, WEVD's call letters and programming moved to 1050 AM, and SBS took over 97.9 as WSKQ-FM. The October NBC-Emmis switch also saw Emmis's WQHT (then at 103.5 MHz.) move to 97.1 MHz., which had been the home of NBC's WYNY. Emmis sold the 103.5 frequency to Westwood One, which also acquired the WYNY call letters and its country music format.

As it had before when it took over the frequency formerly belonging to WHN, WFAN inherited broadcast rights from WNBC as WFAN to this day operates under WNBC's original license. The switch to 660 AM added the New York Knicks and New York Rangers to their lineup along with the Mets, who moved down the dial with the station.

In the end, WFAN retired two of the oldest radio call letters from the dawn of commercial radio: WHN and WNBC.

== The WFAN era ==
=== After the switch ===
As Don Imus had already been the morning show host at WNBC, WFAN left his program in place when they took over the frequency. WFAN's original morning show on 1050 was hosted by Greg Gumbel; his was a straightforward sports show, but it was not doing well in the ratings. At the time of the switch, sports talk radio was still an untested format with questionable prospects, and the idea was that bringing on board a host who appealed to a broader audience would get more people to give the station a try. WFAN also benefitted from having Imus's fans - who were used to tuning into 660 kHz on weekday mornings - in place to listen to other shows. WFAN instantly took advantage of its Imus inheritance; for example, it featured a special live monologue by Imus character "Billy Sol Hargus" from Shea Stadium moments after taking over the 660 frequency. Imus slightly altered his show for his new employer, adding sports updates and replays of last night's big plays. Discussions of sports stories that crossed over to general interest were also featured on the program, although Imus also kept many of his regular comedy bits that were not sports-related.

Initially, WFAN aired sports news and score updates every 15 minutes (at the quarter-hour), but by 1991, began doing updates every 20 minutes (at :00, :20 and :40 past the hour). These updates, called 20-20 Sports Flashes, are now considered an industry standard. Additionally, in a nod to the former WNBC, update anchors often end their top-of-the-hour updates with the catchphrase "And that's what's happening ...", which is how WNBC on-air news readers had ended their updates. WFAN discontinued the thrice-hourly updates on January 2, 2018; until the station ended these in December 2025, news updates occurred only at the top of the hour during and in-between station programming.

Other programming that WFAN had at its launch included a mid-morning show with Ed Coleman and Mike Francesa, and an afternoon drive time show with Pete Franklin, who in Cleveland had become one of the first polarizing, outrageous talk show hosts. During his stay in New York City, Franklin was probably best known for an incident where he used a four-letter expletive on air, in error, when trying to say "All you folks" (he was not disciplined for the incident).

Running a close second was a 30-second Franklin diatribe on whether he had been offensive – "Do I offend anyone? I'm not here to offend you, dammit!" – that has been replayed ever since, especially on the July 1 WFAN anniversaries.

In a further drive to boost ratings, Imus instigated a feud with Franklin, much as he had with Howard Stern at WNBC in the mid-1980s. Both Imus and Franklin took shots at each other during their shows, with Franklin calling Imus "Minus", and Imus recording parodies of radio commercials where he bashed Franklin as a "dinosaur", among other things. Ratings did not increase, and Franklin left WFAN in August 1989.

On September 5, 1989, a jointly hosted afternoon drive show with Francesa and Christopher "Mad Dog" Russo – the latter a weekend/fill-in host prior to that time – would premiere. The Mike and the Mad Dog show became the defining show of WFAN, one of the most consistently popular radio shows in New York City and one of the most influential sports talk radio shows in the country.

=== Radiothon ===
Each spring from 1990 until 2007, WFAN conducted the "WFAN Radiothon" to benefit children's charities that seek to ensure the continuity of life in its earliest stages and the treatment and eventual elimination of childhood cancer. The three most recent beneficiaries of the radiothon were Tomorrow's Children's Fund, the CJ Foundation for SIDS, and the Imus Ranch. WFAN has also done other radiothons and special broadcasts to raise money for assorted charities. The combined success of Mike and the Mad Dog and Imus in the Morning helped WFAN become the number-one billing station in America during the 1990s. It also proved that the all-sports format worked as a radio format, prompting the explosion of sports talk radio across the country.

On August 15, 2008, Mike Francesa announced during the final broadcast of Mike and the Mad Dog that WFAN would broadcast a new fundraising radiothon. The new fundraiser would benefit both the Boomer Esiason Foundation for cystic fibrosis research, and the Mike Francesa Champions of the Heart Foundation, a new charity created by Francesa. The first radiothon took place in September 2008.

=== Sale to Infinity ===
In 1992, Emmis sold WFAN to Infinity Broadcasting, which would be purchased by Westinghouse Electric Corporation – CBS' then-parent company – in 1997.

=== Midday show controversy ===
The midday slot has been one of the better slots from a ratings perspective for WFAN. However, this slot's hosts have often found controversy.

In the mid-1990s, popular hosts Ed Coleman and Dave Sims had their show on the station cancelled (Sims later returned to the station in 2025 as the lead PBP voice for Yankees games). WFAN then announced that New York Daily News columnist Mike Lupica and WNBC-TV sports anchor Len Berman would co-host the new midday program. The show seemed all set to go when, at the last minute, Berman had a change of heart. He cited that he would have to work a near 14-hour day, combining his 10 a.m. start on radio with his WNBC-TV duties, which consisted of him appearing on all three of the station's evening newscasts. WFAN would not let Berman out of his contract, and as a result, the slot was split into two shows: Lupica hosted from 10 a.m. to noon, while Berman hosted from noon to 2 pm. The split format did not work: Berman's show was cancelled and Lupica's soon followed.

WWOR-TV sports anchor Russ Salzberg, who also worked an evening sportscast, was more than willing to assume the midday show duties. In 1995, he was joined by longtime overnight host Steve Somers and the show became known as "The Sweater and The Schmoozer", playing off Salzberg's habit of wearing sweaters on the air and Somers' on-air nickname.

The midday show featured one of the most famous incidents in WFAN history. It occurred when Salzberg "banned" Eli from Westchester from calling his show due to comments that Salzberg considered to be inappropriate. In another incident, Salzberg said to Somers, during an Atlanta Braves World Series appearance, while talking about Braves' manager Bobby Cox: "What about Cox, Steve? You like Cox ... don't you, Steve?"

In 1999, with the ratings not being what WFAN management expected, the Salzberg/Somers show was cancelled and both men were fired. However a large outcry from listeners over the termination of the popular Somers—one of those unhappy listeners being comedian Jerry Seinfeld, a native of Long Island—led to WFAN management giving Somers the evening shift, which (despite frequent pre-emptions for live games) he continued to hold until his retirement in 2021, when he was replaced by Keith McPherson. In middays, Salzberg and Somers were replaced by Suzyn Waldman and Jody McDonald. Waldman had been with WFAN since its infancy, as she was the first update anchor, and had served as the station's Yankees beat reporter and the Knicks' studio host. McDonald, one of the original WFAN personalities (and son of former Mets general manager Joe McDonald), was the weekend overnight host before leaving for sister station WIP in Philadelphia, nearer to his southern New Jersey home. Both Waldman and McDonald had their fans and detractors at WFAN.

Waldman would leave WFAN in late 2001, joining the Yankees television broadcast team the following year. She would be replaced by Sid Rosenberg who, despite his shock jock reputation, had a vast knowledge of sports. Many felt there was great chemistry between McDonald and Rosenberg. However, the ratings still weren't what WFAN expected and in 2004 McDonald was let go. He later joined WEPN, Sirius Satellite Radio, and WPEN radio in Philadelphia before returning in 2012. Overnight host Joe Benigno moved to daytime to replace McDonald and work with Sid Rosensberg. In 2014, Waldman returned to become the first woman color commentator for the station's Yankees broadcasts.

Rosenberg was forced to resign from WFAN on September 12, 2005, after being given an ultimatum by station management for not showing up to host the New York Giants' pregame show the day before. Benigno hosted the weekday midday show solo for over a year, until January 2, 2007, when part-time overnight host Evan Roberts became Benigno's new midday co-host. The pairing continued to consistently out-rate rival station WEPN, which broadcasts network and local programming opposite it. Benigno retired in November 2020 and was replaced by former morning host Craig Carton, and later on Tiki Barber, who previously co-hosted in midday with Brandon Tierney.

WFAN was the sole flagship of the NCAA Men's Basketball Championship carried over Westwood One, but beginning in 2006, competitor WEPN took over a majority of the coverage. That included early round games as well as conference tournament finals to which Dial Global had the rights. WFAN aired some of the conference tournament games, but would not usually air the early round tournament contests, opting instead for local programming. WFAN does broadcast some of the tournament, but the majority—including the Final Four and the National Championship Game—is carried by WEPN-FM.

=== Streaming ===
On April 11, 2006, WFAN started streaming live on the Internet. Web streaming of live games, however, is limited due to broadcast rights (Yankees and Nets games are offered separately, through the MLB and NBA websites respectively, as annual subscriptions). When these games are broadcast over the air, listeners who have Internet access receive alternate sports talk programming through CBS Sports Radio. As of April 2010, WFAN stopped streaming live on the Internet to listeners outside of the United States.

=== Exit Imus, enter Boomer and Carton ===
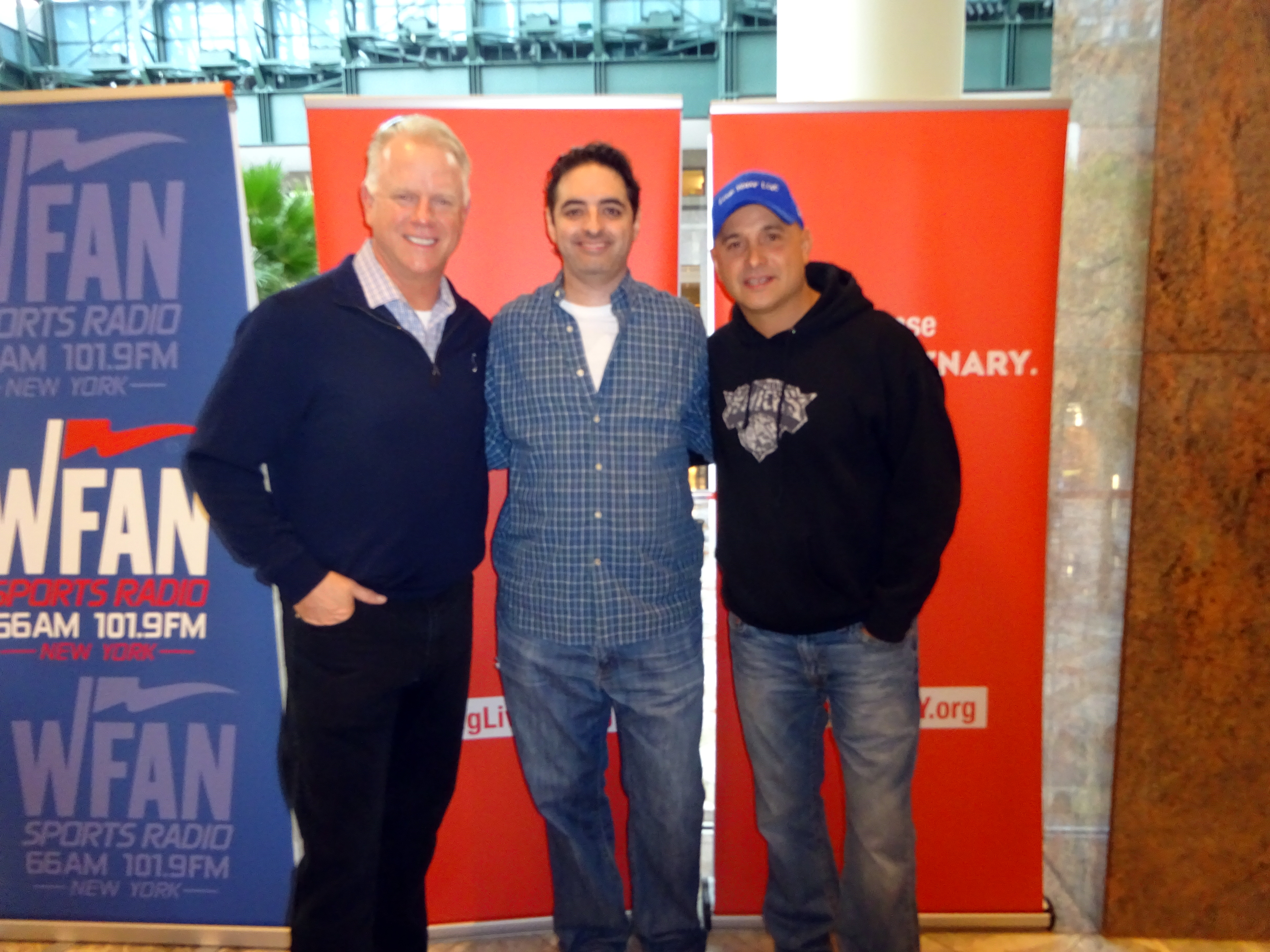
Boomer (left) and Carton (right) in 2016.

On the April 4, 2007, broadcast of Imus in the Morning, Don Imus made a sexually and racially controversial comment in reference to the Rutgers University women's basketball team, during a conversation with the show's producer, Bernard McGuirk, and Sid Rosenberg (who was on the phone).

Two days after making the comments, Imus issued a public apology. By that time, however, there were various calls for his dismissal, particularly from civil rights activists Jesse Jackson and Al Sharpton, who threatened to protest both CBS Radio and MSNBC (which aired a video simulcast of the program), and to boycott companies who advertised on the program. WFAN offered its hosts and listeners a sounding board for their own feelings and comments, which were both for and against his dismissal.

Imus was initially given a two-week suspension which was scheduled to begin on April 16, allowing him to work the annual WFAN Radiothon on April 12 and 13. On consecutive days, Imus made public appearances to address the controversy, first on Sharpton's syndicated radio show (April 9) followed the next day on NBC's Today Show (April 10) to reiterate his regret for the remarks. However, on April 11, MSNBC announced the cancellation of the video simulcast of Imus in the Morning. The following day, CBS Radio dismissed Imus, at the time leaving WFAN with a very large programming—and money-earning—void in its schedule.

Imus' last WFAN program was aired on the opening day of the radiothon. Imus's wife Deirdre joined his longtime co-host, comedy writer, and news reader, Charles McCord, to anchor the final segment of the radiothon on April 13. Imus revived his program at WABC radio in December 2007, and took his fundraiser with him—with the charities intact—and conducted a radiothon there in May 2008.

WFAN afternoon drive co–hosts Mike Francesa and Chris Russo expressed disappointment with Imus's comments, but vehemently disagreed - on air - with the decision to fire Imus. Russo said that management had chosen to "cave" to the pressure.

From that point on, the 6:00 to 10:00 a.m. time slot was filled by various hosts. McCord and Chris Carlin remained on all the replacement shows as assistants and staff, in similar roles as they were on Imus's show, and the replacement shows continued to be syndicated via Westwood One. Mike Francesa and Chris Russo were the first to fill the spot, hosting for the two weeks (April 16–27) immediately after Imus' firing. Francesa and Russo also worked the shift separate from each other, as did fellow WFAN staffers Richard Neer, Joe Benigno and Evan Roberts, and Carlin, who worked both alone and with co-hosts, notably Kimberly Jones and Washington Post sports columnist John Feinstein.

WFAN and Westwood One also brought in outside personalities into the slot. Among them were Boomer Esiason, Patrick McEnroe, Geraldo Rivera, Lou Dobbs, and Chicago market sports radio host Mike North. As MSNBC also held its own claim to the slot, the cable network was able to have its own replacement shows simulcasted; these programs were hosted by in-house personalities David Gregory, Jim Cramer, and Joe Scarborough; eventually Scarborough would become the permanent replacement host on MSNBC with Morning Joe.

=== Twentieth anniversary ===
On July 1, 2007, WFAN celebrated its twentieth anniversary. On the weekend of July 4, past WFAN hosts such as Suzyn Waldman and Jim Lampley did guest-hosting stints, and the station's current hosts provided career and station retrospectives throughout the weekend. The station also invited listeners to vote on the "Greatest New York sports moments", and the "Top 20 New York sports celebrities", during WFAN's 20-year history.

On September 4, 2007, Esiason took over as the permanent host of the WFAN morning show, with veteran radio personality Craig Carton (previously of WKXW-FM in Trenton, New Jersey) serving as co-host, and Chris Carlin remaining to do sports updates. The new program is not distributed nationally by Westwood One. Charles McCord left the station shortly after the announcement was made and rejoined Don Imus at WABC. Carlin was also given his own show in the one-hour time slot immediately preceding Esiason's show. The television simulcast, which had been on MSNBC since 1996, was not immediately brought back; it was not until September 2010 that WFAN reached an agreement with MSG Network to simulcast Boomer and Carton live each weekday; each four-hour show was simulcast live with a condensed one-hour "best-of" program airing later each day and throughout the weekend. In January 2014, the show's televised simulcast moved to CBS Sports Network.

=== The end of Mike and the Mad Dog ===
During their 19-year run as WFAN's afternoon drive team, Mike Francesa and Chris Russo had enjoyed a relationship—both on- and off-air—which varied from respect to contempt. The two hosts did not get along well during the early days of their partnership, and had several differences which potentially put their program in jeopardy. In spite of the disagreements, the duo always seemed to patch things up for the benefit of the station and their listeners.

In early 2008, several reports surfaced that Francesa and Russo were on the outs again, and these reports came as both men's contracts with WFAN were in the early stages of renegotiation. On June 22, 2008, sports columnist Neil Best of Newsday reported that the Francesa/Russo relationship had cooled, and they were considering ending their radio show. Francesa, reached by Newsday while vacationing, refused to comment. Russo, doing the show alone on June 23, denied the rumors. But on the June 27, 2008, broadcast, Francesa (working alone as Russo was on vacation) acknowledged the show was at a "crossroad", and could not guarantee the show would last through the summer. Francesa also stated he and Russo had not spoken since reports of their possible breakup came out.

On July 11, 2008, Francesa and Russo reunited for their first show together since news of their possible breakup came out. Both men were coy about their future beyond the summer. Francesa and Russo then continued their normal summer routine of alternating vacation weeks, and on August 5, 2008, they would do their final show together at the New York Giants' training facility at the University of Albany.

On August 14, 2008, Russo reached a mutual agreement with WFAN to let him out of his contract, which ran until October 2009. Russo insisted it was solely a personal decision and said, "This has nothing to do with Mike and I hating each other... This is about doing something different. I'm 48 years old and there are not going to be too many more opportunities to break away. It's time to try something else, but it was a tough decision to make." On August 15, Russo phoned Francesa on the show to say goodbye. A highly emotional Russo began to break down on air as he talked about his partnership with Francesa.

At the same time, while Russo left WFAN, Francesa signed a five-year deal to stay at WFAN and continue to host the afternoon drive-time show. On August 19, 2008, Russo signed a five-year contract worth about 3 million per year with SiriusXM to headline a new sports talk channel called Mad Dog Radio on both Sirius and XM satellite radio. Russo said there was nothing WFAN could have done to keep him after Sirius XM provided him an opportunity to not only do a show, but have his own channel, which he could not pass up.

=== Move to Manhattan ===
On October 10, 2009, WFAN moved from its first studio location, the landmarked Kaufman Astoria Studios in Astoria, Queens, after 22 years in that location. The station began broadcasting from CBS Radio's then-new Hudson Square studios in Manhattan. Along with the move, the station changed its longtime call-in phone number from 1 (718) 937-6666 to 1 (877) 337-6666.

=== Honors ===
In 2010, the station was honored by the National Association of Broadcasters with the Marconi award for Sports Station of the Year.

=== Controversy ===
In 2012, WFAN drew controversy for a New York City Subway ad that discouraged fans from offering their seats for pregnant women wearing Boston Red Sox gear. Detractors viewed the ad as taking fan attitudes in the Yankees/Red Sox rivalry too far.

=== Twenty-fifth anniversary ===
On June 25, 2012, notable current staff announced their favorite moments, interviews, and teams.

On June 28, 2012, it was revealed that Mike Francesa would join Boomer Esiason and Craig Carton on the Boomer and Carton program on June 29, 2012, as part of the festivities. It marked the first time they had appeared together since 2009, when Francesa was still the number one sports talk show host in New York. Later in the day, Carton and Esiason would join Francesa on his show, Mike's On: Francesa on the FAN.

The same day—Carton surprised everyone by welcoming back host Sid Rosenberg, and Rosenberg later joined Francesa for a short interview the next day. Other notable former hosts who joined Mike Francesa included Christopher "Mad Dog" Russo and Don Imus.

=== WFAN-FM ===
On October 6, 2012, CBS Radio announced the purchase of WRXP (101.9 FM) from Merlin Media for $75 million. CBS began operating 101.9 under a local marketing agreement (LMA) at 11:57 p.m. on November 1, 2012, with the call sign changed to WFAN-FM.

=== Merger with Entercom ===
On February 2, 2017, CBS Radio announced it would merge with Philadelphia-based Entercom. The merger was approved on November 9, 2017, and was consummated eight days later.

On March 30, 2021, Entercom rebranded to the corporate name Audacy. WFAN programming is found on the Audacy.com website and app.

=== Craig Carton arrest ===
Carton was arrested on September 6, 2017, along with Michael Wright, and charged with four counts of fraud in what authorities say was a Ponzi scheme that duped investors of millions of dollars by promising them a share of the profits from the sale of concert tickets. The two were reportedly trying to pay off millions of dollars in gambling debts. Carton was suspended indefinitely by CBS Radio and later resigned from the station. (After his release from prison, Carton returned to the airwaves to partner midday with Evan Roberts, as mentioned above, before briefly leaving and returning again to the station effective 2026, this time with his own afternoon program.) Esiason hosted the morning show by himself with guest hosts, until Gregg Giannotti was announced as Carton's full time replacement.

== Team coverage ==
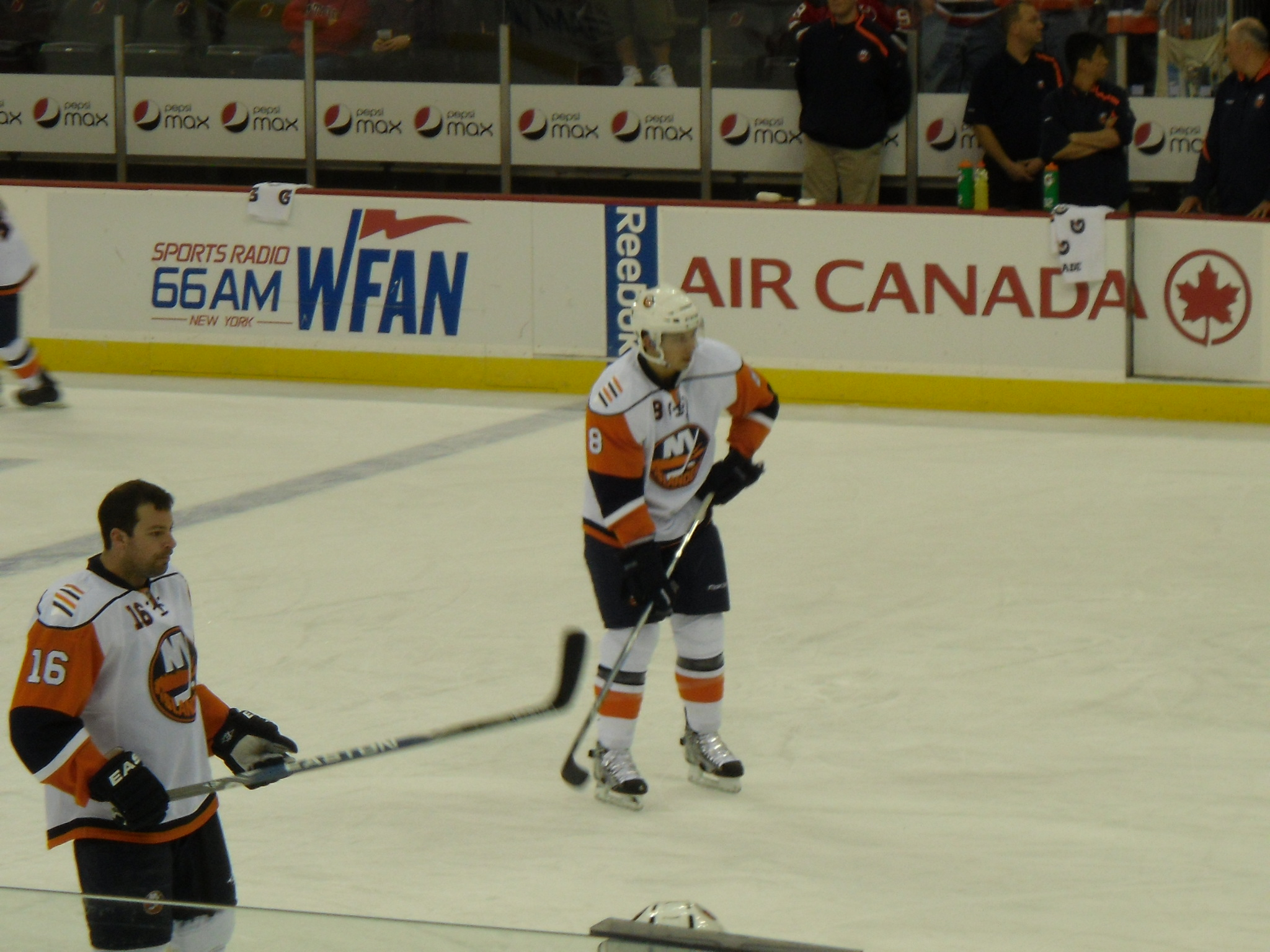
WFAN broadcasting the New York Islanders vs. New Jersey Devils game on April 10, 2010.

Currently, WFAN airs broadcasts of MLB's New York Yankees, the NFL's New York Giants, the NBA's Brooklyn Nets, and Rutgers University football. In addition, select games of the NHL's New Jersey Devils are carried by WFAN, though the bulk of the Devils' schedule is aired exclusively on the co-owned Audacy streaming service (formerly known as Radio.com). WFAN is the flagship outlet for Westwood One's NFL broadcasts and some of its National Collegiate Athletic Association college football and basketball broadcasts.

In years prior to 2019 WFAN used corporate sisters WCBS (AM), WCBS-FM, WNEW-FM and WNYL, and non-sister stations including WNYM, WBBR and WLIB, as outlets for overflow broadcasts when teams are scheduled opposite each other. This was due to contractual terms requiring the Yankees (prior to 2014, the New York Mets) and Giants to have first priority of airtime over the other teams carried by WFAN. Beginning in 2018, WFAN began to split its AM and FM simulcast to allow the station to simultaneously air two events, albeit one on each frequency. When conflicts arise, the station directs its audience to listen to the game of their choice on either 660 AM or 101.9 FM. The simulcast splits became more regular in 2019 after WCBS (AM) began carrying Mets radio broadcasts.

WFAN has marketed itself in recent years as the "Flagship Station for New York Sports". In previous years, Yankees managers (more recently, Aaron Boone) and a member of the Giants (such as, in the past, former quarterback Eli Manning) have made exclusive appearances on WFAN during their respective baseball and football seasons.

The station was the longtime radio home for the Devils, Mets, New York Jets, New York Rangers and New York Knicks (the latter two were inherited from WNBC while the Jets coverage was moved from WCBS). Currently, WFAN's primary competition is WHSQ (the former WCBS AM) and WEPN, the New York ESPN Radio affiliates which now carry the Mets, Knicks and Rangers plus national ESPN Radio programming, all of which WFAN previously broadcast.

During the 2016-17 and 2017-18 seasons, WFAN broadcast New York Islanders games produced by Hofstra University-owned WRHU in Hempstead. Beginning in 2018-19 both the Devils and Islanders moved their broadcasts to the Radio.com platform, though WFAN is expected to broadcast a limited number of Devils contests. The station also carried matches of New York City FC during its inaugural 2015 season. In 2022, the station became the home for Rutgers Scarlet Knights football, replacing longtime flagship station WOR. In August 2024, with WCBS taken over by Good Karma Brands, rights to Scarlet Knights men's basketball also moved to WFAN.

Due to MLB and NFL blackout rules, WFAN is only allowed to air sporting events involving the New York-area teams within its home market; therefore, stations that carry WFAN on a HD radio subchannel are required to broadcast alternate programming in its place.

In 2024, after the Yankees entered the 2024 World Series, WFAN was required to air the World Series coverage on both AM and FM broadcasts. As such, WFAN used WINS, WXBK, and an online overflow stream called WFAN2 to air overflow coverage of Rutgers Football, New York Giants, and Brooklyn Nets coverage until the World Series concluded.

== Influence of sports format ==
WFAN's success—especially after the 1988 frequency switch—proved that sports-talk radio could in fact be a steadily profitable and popular format. This in turn fueled the explosive growth of sports-talk radio in the 1990s and 2000s (decade). Once a novelty, every major market (and many smaller markets) now has at least one sports radio station, and often more. ESPN Radio, Fox Sports Radio and Yahoo! Sports Radio have all launched 24-hour national sports talk radio networks, while NBC Sports Radio and CBS Sports Radio (now Westwood One Sports, the latter of which WFAN would become a member of at one point) debuted in fall 2012. There are also nationally syndicated radio shows, such as The Jim Rome Show and 2 Live Stews. Additionally there are dedicated sports radio streams on satellite radio, such as NFL Radio on Sirius and MLB Home Plate on XM Satellite Radio. With the migration of music stations to FM and other carriers all but complete, sports talk radio are considered to have been critical in saving the AM band as a viable broadcast medium.

It is worth noting that, for all the success and influence that WFAN has had, its signature Mike and the Mad Dog show experienced limited syndication outside of New York state (the show had been carried over WQYK in Tampa, Florida, and WROW in Albany, New York). This was primarily due to a desire by the hosts to keep their show New York-centric.

WFAN once produced some of Fox Sports Radio's programming, notably Chris "Mad Dog" Russo's Saturday show, but the relationship did not last even one year for the same reason that Mike'd Up is syndicated nationally only through the YES Network—the hosts often talk about the NFL on a national basis, but stick mostly to local coverage of baseball. Nevertheless, callers from as far as California and Norway made it to air.

== Frequent callers ==
Callers are an important facet of WFAN programming. A few callers have earned a reputation over the years and become as familiar to listeners as the hosts themselves.

Jerome from Manhattan

Jerome Mittelman, known on-air as "Jerome from Manhattan", is a die-hard Yankees and Knicks fan. Jerome is known for his on-air take-no-prisoners blistering rants and raves, as well as his unique take on the English language. One of his favorite exclamatory phrases is "frickin' frack!" He refers to the bullpen as the "ballpen", and once shouted that the Yankees are "... done! D-O-E-N [sic], DONE!" His relationship status is intriguing enough for Steve Somers to once give Jerome $60 to take a lady out on a date, only for Jerome to keep the money and not go out on the date. Former host Sid Rosenberg once asked Jerome if he was upset that he was not taking his eagerly anticipated trip "... to Colorado?", and Jerome replied, "No, [it was] to Denver." He does "... not like jets. They make [him] seasick". Jerome, when he still called WFAN regularly, was known as being the only caller to have an audio intro, much like those played at the top of each show. Mr. Mittelman's health problems had kept him from the WFAN airwaves on a regular basis from late 2004 until mid-2008; when he again started to call in more frequently. Occasionally when he calls into Steve Somers' program, a special introduction is played to the tune of The Twilight Zone.

Eli from Westchester

Eli Strand, known when calling as "Eli from Westchester", was another famous repeat caller. Citing racism as the underlying factor behind any number of sports happenings, he was occasionally banned from calling for periods of time. One of the most famous times he was banned was by former mid-day host Russ Salzberg. However, he was also given an on-air tryout for the job which would eventually go to Joe Benigno. Strand, from Tuckahoe, New York, played college football at Iowa State University and spent two years in the NFL with the Pittsburgh Steelers and New Orleans Saints.

Miriam from Forest Hills

"Miriam from Forest Hills" is a blind New York Islanders and New York Mets fan from Queens. The first Islanders game Miriam ever attended became the topic of a Rick Reilly column in Sports Illustrated.

Dave from Harlem

David Paterson, former Governor of New York, has been known to call into the station on occasion. He has also used the alias "David from Manhattan". After the end of his term, Paterson sporadically appeared as a guest host and in-studio guest for the station; Paterson accepted a job with WOR in August 2011.

Jerry from Queens

Standup comic and sitcom star Jerry Seinfeld was also an avid Mets fan who sometimes called—and, on occasion, guest-hosted on–WFAN.

Doris from Rego Park

Doris Bauer was one of the regular callers to WFAN. Calling in as "Doris from Rego Park" for a decade, Bauer was recognized by her chronic hacking cough, an encyclopedic knowledge of baseball, and her loyalty to the Mets. She called to talk sports on the overnight show with hosts like Steve Somers. Such was her status as a beloved member of the WFAN talk community that, when she died at 58 of complications from lung and breast cancer, it was host Joe Benigno who broke the news to his late-night audience at 1 am, Doris' usual call–in time.

Omar from Brooklyn

"Omar from Brooklyn" is another regular called on the Boomer and Carton Show. A Buffalo Bills fan, Omar's trademark is to call in on a Monday to rant (often incoherently due to his thick accent) about the Bills shortcomings and his hatred for other New York teams. During these calls there is usually Middle Eastern music playing in the background, courtesy of WFAN. Boomer and Carton had Omar in studio as a guest, and Omar received a pie in the face from Boomer. Omar also received tickets from Boomer to a Jets-Bills game in 2011.

Ira from Staten Island

Ira Lieberfarb is a frequent caller from Arden Heights, Staten Island that almost exclusively talks New York Jets football. Ira has been calling the station since 1993 and attends every Jets game (both home and away). In 2012, he was rewarded with a one-on-one conversation with Mike Francesa after being voted as one of the most famous callers during WFAN's 25th anniversary celebration.

Short Al from Brooklyn

Albert Kaufman was a retired mailman and widower, who was a devoted Mets fan and a near daily caller to the FAN, from its inception in 1987 until his prolonged absence from the airwaves in 2009 made him the subject of a front page story in the New York Times.

Mike from Mahopac

Mike "Sour Shoes" DelCampo, a voice impersonator also known for his long association with The Howard Stern Show, was best known for calling in to Mike and the Mad Dog. Francesa eventually tired of DelCampo's schtick and stopped taking his calls.

== The FAN Sports Network ==
In addition to having its broadcast heard on 660 AM in New York City, WFAN's programming is also transmitted via a secured internet feed to Audacy owned and operated stations. These stations simulcast the same over-the air feed that is heard in New York City including all of the live team coverage of the New York Yankees, New York Giants, New Jersey Devils, and the Brooklyn Nets. The internet stream legally cannot include professional sports coverage because Major League Baseball, the National Basketball Association, and the National Football League, provide their own in-house on-demand and yearly subscription services for live and archived radio and television broadcasts. WFAN's simulcasts make it one of only a handful of terrestrial based radio superstations in the United States; KPIG-FM in Freedom, California, and WBBR in New York also syndicate terrestrially, though through different providers.

== Notable on-air staff ==
=== Current on-air staff ===
- Tiki Barber
- Joe Benigno
- Craig Carton
- Boomer Esiason
- Bob Heussler
- Ann Liguori
- Richard Neer
- Jerry Recco
- Evan Roberts
- Dave Sims
- Suzyn Waldman

=== Former on-air staff ===
- Len Berman
- Mike Breen
- Kevin Burkhardt
- Roberto Clemente Jr.
- Gary Cohen
- Linda Cohn
- Howard David
- Spero Dedes
- Ian Eagle
- Scott Ferrall
- Mike Francesa
- Pete Franklin
- Greg Gumbel
- Don Imus
- Kimberly Jones
- Jim Lampley
- Steve Levy
- Josh Lewin
- Mike Lupica
- Anita Marks
- Bill Mazer
- Tom McCarthy
- Charles McCord
- John Minko
- Bob Murphy
- Tony Paige
- Howie Rose
- Sid Rosenberg
- Spencer Ross
- Chris Russo
- Sam Ryan
- Bart Scott
- John Sterling
- Steve Somers
- Gary Thorne
- Bob Wischusen
- Rick Wolff
- Warner Wolf

== See also ==
- List of initial AM-band station grants in the United States
