= Hannity's America =

- Title card for Hannity's America
- Presented by: Sean Hannity
- Country of origin: United States
- No. of episodes: 50

Production
- Running time: 60 minutes

Original release
- Network: Fox News Channel
- Release: January 7, 2007 – January 4, 2009

Hannity's America is a weekly American talk show on the Fox News Channel hosted by Sean Hannity. It was replaced in January 2009 with Hannity.

== Overview ==
At the beginning of each show, Hannity gives his opinion about the nation as a whole, usually relating to issues happening in politics over the past week.

Additionally, the program also features other segments, including "2 on 2" and "Hannity's Hot Seat." During the "2 on 2" segment, Hannity welcomes one conservative to join his side and two liberals to talk about issues covered earlier in the program, commonly causing conflict between both sides with differing ideals.

The "Hot Seat" section of the program features someone who Hannity has an issue with, debating them about what they have talked about.

Later, a segment called "Beyond Belief" was added, which focused on Christian and spiritual issues, such as angels and ghosts.

Fox News reader Ainsley Earhardt often does an unsolved crime story.

In the final segment of the show, Hannity usually features a segment called "Your America." Hannity describes it as "stories you didn't read about in the New York Times."

Hannity's America shares its theme song with the first part of his ABC Radio talk show.

The show was rebranded as Hannity and follows a similar format as the previous show. "Beyond Belief" is an occasional segment on the new show.

== See also ==
- The Sean Hannity Show
- Hannity & Colmes
- Fox News Channel
