= Steve Somers =

American talk radio host

- Born: April 17, 1947 (age 79); San Francisco, California, U.S.
- Education: University of California, Berkeley
- Occupation: Sportscaster
- Years active: c.1968–present

Steve Somers (born April 17, 1947), nicknamed the Schmoozer, is an American talk radio host best known for his work on the New York City sports radio station WFAN (660 AM). He has been with the station since its inception in 1987.

== Early life ==
Somers is a native of San Francisco, California, and became a fan of the San Francisco Giants upon the team's arrival to the city in 1958. He graduated from the University of California at Berkeley in 1969. He currently resides in Manhattan. His nickname is, "the Schmoozer." He roots for the New York Mets (or Metropolitans as he refers to them), the New York Knicks (or Knickerbockers), the New York Rangers and New York Jets (sometimes he even calls them the Jetropolitans).

== Career ==
Somers began his career in the Bay Area. Before graduating high school, he worked at KYA radio in San Francisco delivering on air high school sports reports. After college, Somers began hosting a news talk show on KNEW radio in Oakland. To that effect, Time Magazine ran a story naming him the youngest talk show host in the country at that period of time. Somers also worked as a public address announcer for the NBA's San Francisco Warriors.

In 1970, Somers joined KPIX in San Francisco as a weekend sports anchor and won a San Francisco Press Club Award. Over the next decade and a half he held other television sportscasting positions at KOVR in Sacramento, WXIA-TV in Atlanta and KNBC in Los Angeles. While in Los Angeles, he also launched a sports talk program at KMPC radio.

=== WFAN (1987-present) ===
Somers joined WFAN at the station's inception in July 1987. He spent his first few years with the station as the overnight host. While he was on the overnight program he dubbed himself "Captain Midnight". During this time he conducted one of the last ever interviews with Mark Koenig, who was the last living member of the 1927 New York Yankees. He later spent a few years co-hosting the 10am-1pm slot with WWOR-TV sports anchor Russ Salzberg. The program was titled "The Sweater and the Schmoozer." At that time, Somers developed some of the quirks that have been hallmarks of his WFAN tenure, dropping catchphrases such as "schmoooooozing S-P-O-R-T-S" (spelling out the word "sports"), giving time checks in minutes and seconds, uniquely reading the end of the station's phone number as "six-six-six-six" rather than the standard "sixty six-sixty six", joking at the expense of engineer Eddie Scozzare ("THE Eddie Scozzare?" "No, Eddie Maple, who do you think we're talking?" yes THE Eddie Scozzare), and reading the catalogue numbers of live commercials ("LV-242, for those of you scoring at home, and I know you are..."). He is also known to refer to the New York Mets, by their official name "The New York Metropolitans" drawing out the parts as Metro-Politans, and referring to the Islanders as the Ice-landers.

Currently, Somers usually works during the evening on weekdays. His program can be heard anywhere from 6:30pm to 2am, depending on whether WFAN airs a sporting event that night. He is also sometimes heard on weekends. He is colloquially known as "The Schmoozer." Somers has said of the infrequent scheduling, "Sometimes, just sometimes, I forget what time zone I live in."

In October 2021, Somers stated that WFAN's owner Audacy had requested to move his show back into the overnight hours, a request Somers declined as he was no longer willing to work a graveyard slot. He stated that, because of the request, he was planning on retiring from his regular shift at WFAN "sooner rather than later," with the intention of remaining at WFAN on a reduced schedule as a fill-in host if Audacy allows.

On Sunday, February 25, 2024, Somers returned to WFAN. He also stated he would once again return to the air the following Saturday.

In November 2025, Somers released his memoir Me Here, You There: My Three Decades Overnight, Under the Covers, Schmoozing S-P-O-R-T-S as Captain Midnight for WFAN.

=== Film ===
Somers appeared in the 1979 film The Visitor.
