= Jocelyn Elise Crowley =

American professor (born 1970)

- Born: September 5, 1970 (age 56); Englewood, New Jersey, U.S.
- Spouse: Alan Colmes (m. 2003; died 2017)
- Relatives: Monica Crowley (sister)

Academic background
- Education: Cornell University (BA); Georgetown University (MPP); Massachusetts Institute of Technology (PhD)
- Thesis: The New Social Policy: Transforming Child Support Enforcement in the United States (1999)
- Website: http://www.jocelyncrowley.com

Jocelyn Elise Crowley (born September 5, 1970) is an American academic working as a professor of public policy at Rutgers University–New Brunswick, where she specializes in family law in the United States.

== Early life ==
Crowley was born on September 5, 1970, in Englewood, New Jersey. She grew up in Warren Township, New Jersey, with her sister Monica Crowley.

== Education ==
Crowley earned a Bachelor of Arts degree, summa cum laude, in government with distinguished honors from Cornell University in May 1992. She received her master's degree in public policy from Georgetown University in May 1994, with a specialization in American social policy. In September 1999, Crowley received her Ph.D. in political science from Massachusetts Institute of Technology with a concentration in the field of American politics.

== Personal life ==
Crowley was married to the late American radio and television host Alan Colmes from 2003 until his death in 2017. Her sister is an American political commentator and the current chief of protocol of the United States, Monica Crowley.

== Selected bibliography ==
- Crowley, Jocelyn Elise. (2003). The Politics of Child Support in America. New York: Cambridge University Press. ISBN 978-0-5215-3511-3.
- Crowley, Jocelyn Elise. (2008). Defiant Dads: Fathers’ Rights Activists in America. Ithaca, NY: Cornell University Press. ISBN 978-0-8014-4690-0.
- Crowley, Jocelyn Elise. (2013). Mothers Unite! Organizing for Workplace Flexibility and the Transformation of Family Life. Ithaca, NY: Cornell University Press. ISBN 978-0-8014-5175-1.
- Crowley, Jocelyn Elise. (2018). Gray Divorce: What We Lose and Gain from Mid-Life Splits. Oakland, CA: University of California Press. ISBN 9780520295322.
