= What the (Bleep) Just Happened? =

Non-fiction book by Monica Crowley

- Author: Monica Crowley
- Language: English
- Subject: American politics
- Published: June 19, 2012
- Publisher: Broadside Books
- Pages: 382 pp.
- ISBN: 978-0-06-213115-7
- OCLC: 768800592

What the (Bleep) Just Happened?: The Happy Warrior's Guide to the Great American Comeback is a 2012 book by Fox News contributor Monica Crowley. It was published by Broadside Books, a HarperCollins imprint.

What the (Bleep) Just Happened? was a New York Times bestseller. In 2013, the book was re-released with an afterword and the title What the (Bleep) Just Happened... Again?: The Happy Warrior's Guide to the Great American Comeback.

According to Crowley, the book's name came from a conversation she had with her friend about the Obama administration:

Every day, we were getting hit with a new piece of insane leftist social engineering or some new policy to take down American power or prestige abroad—a rapid-fire assault I call “Barack-a-mole.” Our enemies were getting olive branches, our allies were getting dissed, and millions of Americans were being moved into government dependency at home. “What the (bleep) just happened?” I sighed. She looked at me and said, “That’s your title.” And so it came to be.

== Reception ==
Kirkus Reviews panned the book, writing that Crowley's "vitriol corrodes any basis for rational discussion". The review suggested that readers pass on the book unless they are Fox News junkies, saying it is "just a restatement of similar xenophobic, snarkily presented sentiment". A review by Lauren Weiner in The Weekly Standard said that Crowley's arguments were overstated and employed doggerel. Weiner wrote further that after "over 300 pages of cynical quips, Nixonian realism, and declarations that 'the romanticism of the Left is over'", Crowley declared herself a "happy warrior".

== Plagiarism ==
Following the announcement by the Donald Trump administration in December 2016 that Crowley would be appointed to the U.S. National Security Council, reports surfaced of plagiarism in What the (Bleep) Just Happened?. A January 7, 2017 report from CNN Money alleged numerous instances of plagiarism in the book, including over fifty incidents of copying from published sources without giving attribution.

The Trump transition team responded that:

Any attempt to discredit Monica is nothing more than a politically motivated attack that seeks to distract from the real issues facing this country ... HarperCollins—one of the largest and most respected publishers in the world—published her book which has become a national best-seller.

Two days later, on January 9, 2017, a Politico report alleged a dozen instances of plagiarism in her 2000 Ph.D. dissertation on international relations at Columbia University. Crowley had previously been accused of plagiarism in 1999 related to a column on Richard Nixon she wrote for The Wall Street Journal containing "striking similarities" (according to the Journal) with a piece written eleven years earlier by Paul Johnson. The next day, HarperCollins announced that "What the (Bleep) Just Happened?, which has reached the end of its natural sales cycle, will no longer be offered for purchase until such time as the author has the opportunity to source and revise the material." In 2019, it remained available from HarperCollins as an e-book download.
