= Monica Crowley =

American diplomat (born 1968)

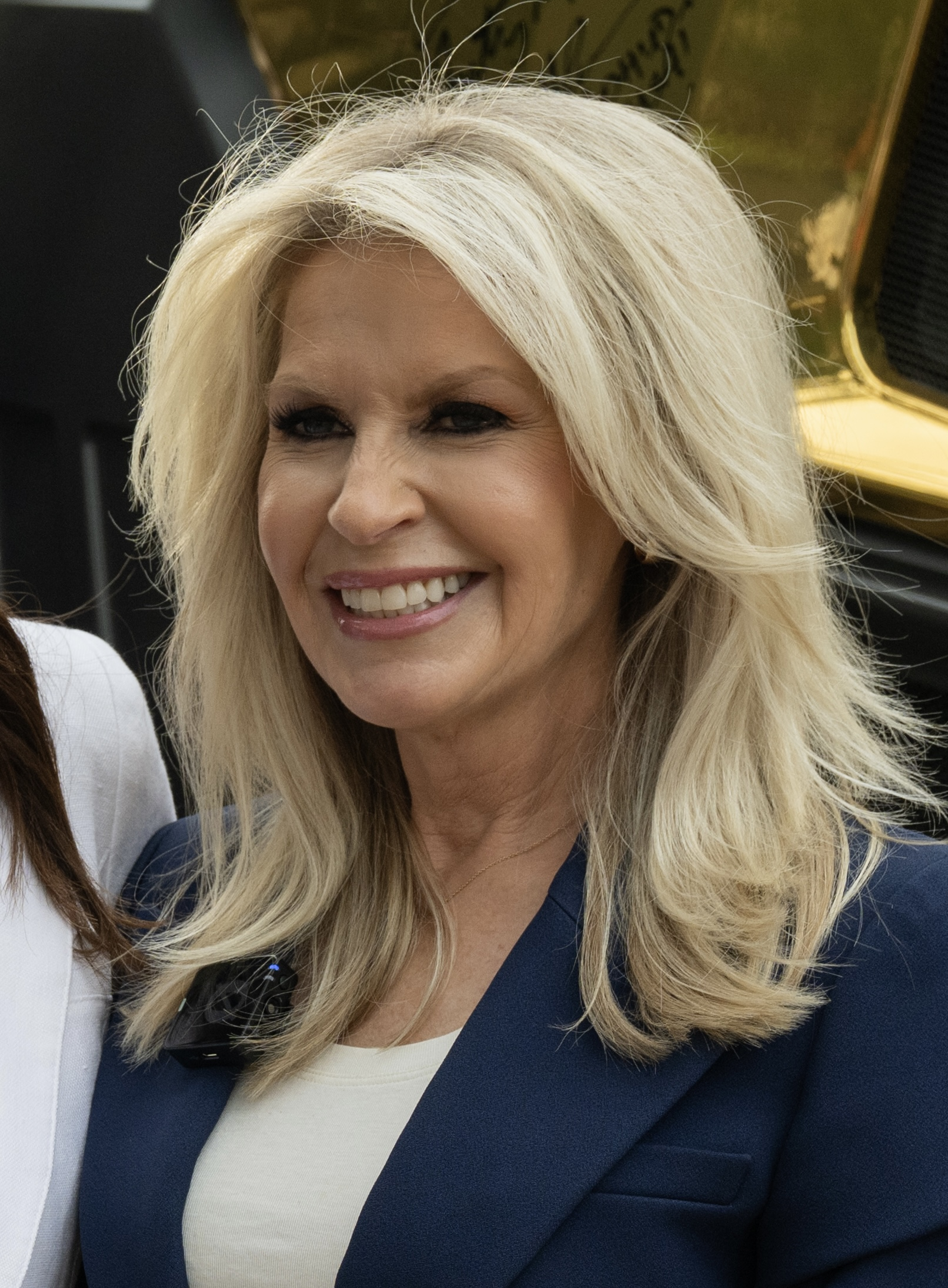
- Crowley in 2025

Chief of Protocol of the United States
- Incumbent
- Assumed office May 30, 2025
- President: Donald Trump
- Preceded by: Rufus Gifford

Assistant Secretary of the Treasury for Public Affairs
- In office July 24, 2019 – January 20, 2021
- President: Donald Trump
- Preceded by: Tony Sayegh
- Succeeded by: Calvin Mitchell

Personal details
- Born: Monica Elizabeth Crowley; September 19, 1968 (age 58) Fort Huachuca, Arizona, U.S.
- Party: Republican
- Relatives: Jocelyn Crowley (sister)
- Education: Colgate University (BA); Columbia University (MA, PhD)
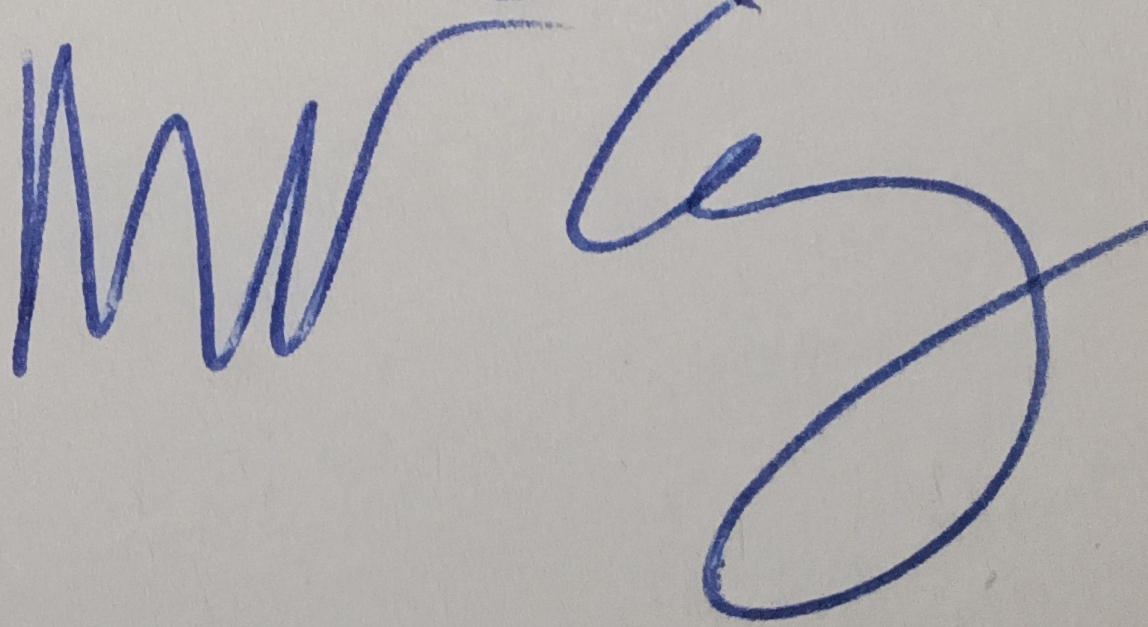
- Signature

Monica Elizabeth Crowley (born September 19, 1968) is an American diplomat and former political commentator who has served as the 35th Chief of Protocol of the United States since 2025. A member of the Republican Party, she served in the U.S. Department of the Treasury as the assistant secretary for public affairs in the first Trump administration from 2019 to 2021. She was a Fox News contributor, where she worked (with a few breaks) from 1996 to 2017, and was an opinion editor for The Washington Times and a member of the Council on Foreign Relations.

In December 2016, President-elect Donald Trump announced his intention to appoint Crowley as deputy national security advisor. She withdrew a month later following reports that she had plagiarized portions of her 2012 book What the (Bleep) Just Happened? and that there were "localized instances of plagiarism" of her 2000 Ph.D. dissertation that Columbia concluded did not meet the level of "research misconduct". In 2019, Trump announced Crowley's appointment as spokesperson for the Treasury Department, serving until 2021. After the 2024 presidential election, Crowley was nominated to serve in the U.S. Department of State as chief of protocol in the second Trump administration.

== Early life and education ==
Crowley was born at Fort Huachuca, an Army base located outside Sierra Vista, Arizona, and grew up in Warren Township, New Jersey. Crowley graduated from Watchung Hills Regional High School in 1986.

She holds a BA in political science from Colgate University and a Ph.D. in international relations from Columbia University in 2000. There were "localized instances of plagiarism" in her dissertation that Columbia concluded did not meet the level of "research misconduct".

== Career ==
=== Media ===
External videos
- [Nixon Off the Record] | C-SPAN.org Booknotes interview with Crowley on Nixon off the Record', September 29, 1996, C-SPAN

In the mid-1990s, Crowley wrote a regular column for the New York Post. She has also written for The New Yorker, The Washington Times, The Wall Street Journal, the Los Angeles Times, and the Baltimore Sun.

Crowley was a commentator for National Public Radio's Morning Edition in the mid-1990s. Since 2002, she hosts a nationally syndicated radio show, The Monica Crowley Show, and she is a regular contributor to The John Batchelor Show.

In 1996, Crowley joined Fox News Channel, where she was a foreign affairs and political analyst and occasionally substituted for Sean Hannity on Fox News Channel's Hannity. In 2004, she joined MSNBC's Connected: Coast to Coast with co-host Ron Reagan. After a nine-month run, the last show aired on December 9, 2005. Crowley has also been a recurring guest on Imus in the Morning and has hosted the MSNBC broadcast The Best of Imus in the Morning. In 2007, she returned as a contributor to Fox News Channel. She was also a regular participant on The McLaughlin Group from late 2007 to 2011.

Crowley was an occasional panelist on Fox News Channel's late-night talk show; Red Eye w/ Greg Gutfeld. She had been a guest host for Bill O'Reilly on The O'Reilly Factor and his subsequent podcast and appeared opposite Alan Colmes on an episode of The O'Reilly Factor in a segment called "Barack and a Hard Place". She was also an occasional guest host on the daily (5:00 pm ET) Fox opinion show, The Five.

Crowley appeared in the TV series 24 in 2001, and in the Netflix original series House of Cards in 2013, portraying herself in both. She has been a guest on The Colbert Report in 2005 (S1 • Episode 9) and on Real Time With Bill Maher in 2003 (S1 • Episode 2).

In election-day commentary in 2016 on Fox News, speaking of Republican candidate Donald Trump's impending upset victory, Crowley said, "This is a revolt of the unprotected class against the protected elite class."

=== Politics ===
As a student, Crowley began writing letters to former president Richard Nixon, who hired her as a research assistant in 1990 when she was 22. She was an editorial advisor and consultant on Nixon's last two books, and following Nixon's death, she published two books about him: Nixon off the Record: His Candid Commentary on People and Politics and Nixon in Winter.

In March 2017, Crowley joined the firm of Douglas Schoen as a part-time consultant, providing "outreach services" on behalf of Ukrainian industrialist and political figure Victor Pinchuk. Crowley registered as a foreign agent as required by the Foreign Agents Registration Act of 1938.

Following Trump's election victory, it was announced in December 2016 that Crowley would join the Trump administration as a deputy national security advisor. Following this announcement, on July 16, 2019, Trump announced Crowley's appointment as Assistant Secretary for Public Affairs in the Treasury Department. Crowley replaced Tony Sayegh, who left the position in May, as the top spokeswoman for Treasury Secretary Steven Mnuchin.

Crowley is a contributor to Project 2025; her name is listed alongside the Nixon Seminar, of which she is a member.

On December 4, 2024, president-elect Trump announced that Crowley would be appointed as the ambassador, assistant secretary of state, and chief of protocol.

=== Plagiarism ===
External videos
- Booknotes interview with Crowley on Nixon off the Record, September 29, 1996, C-SPAN

Crowley has been shown to have committed plagiarism associated with a column on Richard Nixon she wrote for The Wall Street Journal which contained "striking similarities" (according to the Journal) to a piece written 11 years earlier by Paul Johnson. When contacted by The New York Times for comment, Crowley responded, "I did not, nor would I ever, use material from a source without citing it."

On January 7, 2017, CNN published a report documenting numerous instances of plagiarism in Crowley's 2012 book, What the (Bleep) Just Happened? The book includes about 50 examples of copying freely from published sources with no attribution given, including from Wikipedia. In a statement, the Trump transition team called the plagiarism report "nothing more than a politically motivated attack" and stood by her.

Two days later, on January 9, 2017, Politico reported that a dozen additional instances of plagiarism were in Crowley's 2000 Ph.D. dissertation on international relations at Columbia University. In December 2019, an internal Columbia University investigation concluded that Crowley had engaged in “localized instances of plagiarism” but that the plagiarism did not meet the level of "research misconduct."

Shortly after reports emerged that she plagiarized the book What the (Bleep) Just Happened?, the publisher of the book, HarperCollins, announced:

The book, which has reached the end of its natural sales cycle, will no longer be offered for purchase until such time as the author has the opportunity to source and revise the material.

On January 16, 2017, Crowley withdrew from consideration for the role of senior director of strategic communications at the National Security Council in the Trump administration. "I have decided to remain in New York to pursue other opportunities," she said in a statement. The Washington Times, where she served previously as online opinion editor, said the same day that it would be investigating her work at the paper for possible incidents of additional plagiarism by her.

Crowley subsequently told Fox News host Sean Hannity, "What happened to me was a despicable, straight-up, political hit job" and said that it had been "debunked." Andrew Kaczynski, the CNN reporter who first reported instances of plagiarism in Crowley's book, called her claims of innocence false and "complete BS," stating: "No one has yet to point out a single inaccuracy in our reporting or asked for a correction on it. Monica Crowley v. reality."

=== Obama conspiracy theories ===
Crowley has supported false claims that President Barack Obama is secretly a Muslim. In 2010, after Obama defended the right to build the Islamic community center Park51 in Lower Manhattan near the World Trade Center, Crowley suggested he had dual loyalties to Islam and the United States, and asked, "How could he....support the enemy?" In 2013, she said that the Muslim Brotherhood had "found an ally" in Obama.

In 2009, she noted that Obama used his full name, Barack Hussein Obama, during his Oath of office of the president of the United States swearing in as president (which presidents typically do), had early in his presidency ordered the closure of the Guantánamo Bay detention camp, and granted an interview to the media outlet Al Arabiya, saying this "tells you where his head is and, possibly, his sympathies. Just sayin'."

In 2011, Crowley said that birther conspiracy theories about Obama raised legitimate concerns.

In 2015, she shared an article which described Obama as an "Islamic community organizer" who was "conforming US policy to Islam and Sharia."

== Bibliography ==
- Nixon Off the Record: His Candid Commentary on People and Politics. New York: Random House. 1996. ISBN 9780679456810. OCLC 473225114.
- Nixon in Winter. New York: Random House. 1998. ISBN 9780679456957. OCLC 37688321.
- What the (Bleep) Just Happened?: The Happy Warrior's Guide to the Great American Comeback. New York: Broadside Books, an imprint of HarperCollinsPublishers. 2012. ISBN 9780062131157. OCLC 768800592.
