= The Alan Colmes Show =

- Genre: Talk radio show
- Running time: 3 hours
- Country of origin: United States
- Language(s): English
- Hosted by: Alan Colmes
- Executive producer(s): Joel Morton
- Recording studio: Manhattan, New York City
- Original release: February 2003 – February 22, 2017
- Opening theme: "Psycho" by Muse
- Other themes: Various throughout the show
- Website: Official Website
- Podcast: Official Podcast

The Alan Colmes Show was a nationally syndicated American radio show hosted by commentator Alan Colmes on Fox News Radio. The show aired on weeknights from 6:00 p.m.-9:00 p.m. (Eastern Time) from Fox's Manhattan studios. The program was carried by a number of terrestrial radio stations across the country via Fox News syndication unit Fox News Radio, as well as by XM Satellite Radio and Sirius Satellite Radio, both on channel 126 Fox News Talk. The show featured commentary by Colmes, numerous callers, and interviews of guests. It began broadcasting in February 2003.

The show's last original broadcast was on February 23, 2017, the same day that Colmes died at the age of 66 from lymphoma.

For the February 24, 2017 broadcast (final broadcast of Colmes' show), Fox News Radio aired a retrospective-themed edition, replaying select episodes of his show from over the years. Then, on February 27, 2017, to replace Colmes's show, Fox News Radio began utilizing a rotating cast of hosts for a yet-to-be-named show.
