= Alan Colmes =

American broadcaster (1950–2017)

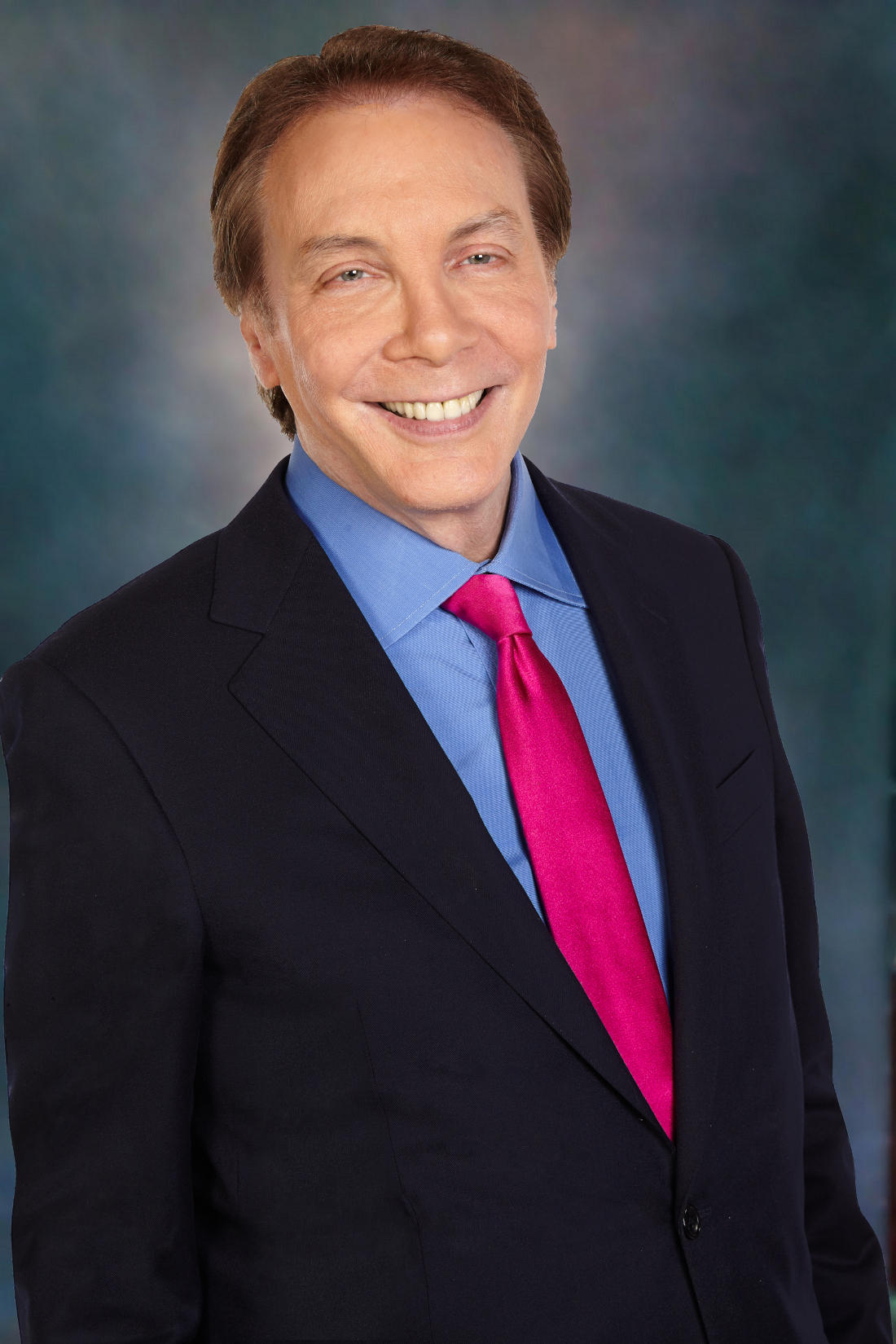
- Colmes in 2014
- Born: Alan Samuel Colmes; September 24, 1950; New York City, U.S.
- Died: February 23, 2017 (aged 66); New York City, U.S.
- Education: Hofstra University (BA)
- Occupations: Television and radio host, political commentator, writer, blogger
- Employer: Fox News Channel
- Political party: Democratic
- Spouse: Jocelyn Elise Crowley (m. 2003)
- Website: www.radiohalloffame.com/alan-colmes

Alan Samuel Colmes (September 24, 1950 – February 23, 2017) was an American radio and television host, liberal political commentator for the Fox News Channel, and blogger.

From 1996 to 2009, Colmes served as the co-host, along with Sean Hannity, of Hannity & Colmes, a nightly political debate show on Fox News Channel. He was the host of The Alan Colmes Show, a nationally syndicated talk-radio show distributed by Fox News Radio that was broadcast throughout the United States on Fox News Talk on Sirius and XM. Beginning in 2015, Colmes supplied the voice of The Liberal Panel on Fox News Channel's The Greg Gutfeld Show.

In addition to broadcasting, Colmes ran the Liberaland blog and contributed to AOL News. He was the author of Red, White & Liberal: How Left Is Right and Right Is Wrong (2003) and Thank the Liberals for Saving America (2012).

== Early life and education ==
Colmes was born to a Jewish family in Brooklyn. He grew up in Lynbrook, New York on Long Island, attended local public schools and went to Hofstra University, where he graduated in 1971 with a Bachelor of Arts degree from its School of Communications. While at Hofstra, he worked at its radio station, WVHC, which later became WRHU.

== Early career ==
Colmes began his career in comedy. He developed his radio career in the Northeast, eventually working at stations such as WABC, WNBC, WHN, WMCA and WEVD in New York, WNHC in New Haven, Connecticut, and WEZE and WZLX in Boston.

Colmes' radio career took off when WABC hired him for the morning drive time slot. He was billed as "W. Alan B. Colmes", as in the station's call sign. He moved to WNBC in 1987, but his tenure there would be short when NBC announced in 1988 it would close its radio division. When WNBC went off the air for the last time on October 7, 1988, Colmes' was the last voice heard. He had been syndicated nationally, starting with his involvement with Daynet, a venture created by Colmes and other regional radio hosts. Daynet was sold to Major Networks, Inc. in 1994.

== Fox News ==
Colmes was hired by Fox News chief executive officer Roger Ailes in 1996. He was the co-host of Hannity & Colmes, beginning with the Fox News Channel launch on October 7, 1996, and ending on January 9, 2009.

Colmes kept his radio show, which was distributed by Fox News Radio.

Colmes' debut non-fiction book, Red, White & Liberal: How Left is Right and Right is Wrong (ISBN 0-06-056297-8), was published in October 2003. It tackles issues such as civil rights, the war on terror, and liberal media bias. Interspersed throughout are actual emails from Hannity & Colmes viewers, reprinted verbatim.

Colmes left Hannity & Colmes, with Fox replacing it with Hannity, in January 2009. Colmes continued as a commentator on Fox News, most often on The O'Reilly Factor where he frequently appeared with his conservative sister-in-law, Monica Crowley. He was also an occasional guest-panelist on Fox News' late-night satire program Red Eye w/ Greg Gutfeld.

After Hannity & Colmes, Colmes was a frequent panelist on the news analysis program Fox News Watch alongside Cal Thomas, Judith Miller, and other pundits.

== Criticism ==
While Colmes described himself as a liberal and his Fox News biography touted him as "a hard-hitting liberal", he has sometimes been referred to disparagingly as a "token liberal" or a "Fox News liberal". Colmes told USA Today in 1995 that he considered himself "quite moderate". In an article he wrote in 2013, Colmes described himself as "very liberal".

During his run on Hannity & Colmes, Colmes was criticized for being less charismatic and telegenic than Sean Hannity, and just a "seat-filler" for the liberal side. Some newspapers reported him as being Hannity's "sidekick". Former Democratic Senator Al Franken criticized Colmes in his book Lies and the Lying Liars Who Tell Them, saying he refused to ask tough questions during debates and neglected to challenge erroneous claims made by Hannity or his guests. Franken used a smaller font in his book when he addressed "Colmes" by name and claimed that Colmes did not speak as much as Hannity during the show. Some liberal critics questioned whether both hosts received equal time to interview guests. Some of Colmes' liberal critics, notably commentators at Media Matters for America, praised him toward the end of the show's run. He began to cite their reports in interviews with some conservative guests on the program.

Bob Garfield, interviewing Colmes for On the Media in 2003, asked him if he was "the human straw man" and a "foil" rather than an equal of Hannity. Colmes replied that if the conservative members of the audience saw him that way, that was "their problem", and said "It's more fun for me to be in a situation like this than to preach to the choir."

== In popular culture ==
On January 5, 2009, the beginning of his last week on Hannity & Colmes, Colmes was a guest on The Colbert Report in a spoof called "Colbert & Colmes", which parodied criticisms of Hannity & Colmes. In addition to being given a list of pre-approved responses to Stephen Colbert's opinions and forced to sit on a stool (making him appear shorter than his co-host), Colmes' face was covered by the on-air graphics while Colbert discussed issues of the day. Colbert "fired" Colmes by the end of the show for pointing out fallacies in his logic.

Following Colmes' announcement that he was leaving Hannity & Colmes, The Daily Show with Jon Stewart also paid tribute to him with a guest appearance by rock duo Hall & Oates, who in a parody version of their hit "She's Gone", dubbed him "Tango to his (Hannity's) Cash" and "Laurel to his Hardy".

== Personal life and death ==
Colmes was married to Jocelyn Elise Crowley, a professor of public policy at Rutgers University, whose sister is Monica Crowley, the conservative radio commentator, pundit, television personality, and Chief of Protocol of the United States.

Colmes died of lymphoma at the Memorial Sloan Kettering Cancer Center in Manhattan on February 23, 2017, at the age of 66.
