= Dale Parsons =

Canadian gridiron football player (born c. 1934)

Profile
- Position: Center

Personal information
- Born: c. 1934 (age 91–92); Regina, Saskatchewan
- Listed height: 6 ft 2 in (1.88 m)
- Listed weight: 215 lb (98 kg)

Career history
- 1956–1959: Saskatchewan Roughriders
- 1960–1966: Calgary Stampeders

Dale Parsons (born c. 1934) is a retired Canadian football player who played for the Calgary Stampeders and Saskatchewan Roughriders. He played college football at the University of Arizona.
