= Hannity =

American political talk show

- Genre: Political program
- Presented by: Sean Hannity
- Country of origin: United States
- Original language: English
- No. of seasons: 18 (As of 2026)

Production
- Production locations: Florida; New York City
- Camera setup: Multi-camera
- Running time: 60 minutes

Original release
- Network: Fox News
- Release: January 12, 2009 – present

Hannity is an American conservative television political talk program on Fox News hosted by Sean Hannity. Episodes air live at 9:00 p.m. from Monday through Thursday, while episodes that air on Fridays are pre-recorded, with a repeat airing at 2:00 a.m. the following morning. The show focuses on the development of the day's events with long monologues, political analysis, and legal analysis. The show has been a part of the Fox News program lineup since January 12, 2009 succeeding Hannity & Colmes, and is the number one cable news broadcast in its time slot. On nights when Hannity is not available, Jason Chaffetz, Charlie Hurt, Kayleigh McEnany, and Kellyanne Conway fill in as substitute hosts.

== Format ==
At the beginning of the show, Hannity opens with an opening monologue detailing the political issues of the day. He then transitions to clips backing evidence or showing statements of opposition forces. When Hannity finishes his opening monologue, he goes to a political & legal panel analyzing the situations on hand. After the opening segments, the show has a looser format. Hannity may go to another monologue, go to an interview, or continue with another panel.

The first guest on Hannity was former Speaker of the House Newt Gingrich. Hannity featured an exclusive interview with Don Imus during his premiere week. During the second week, conservative talk show host Rush Limbaugh appeared in an exclusive two-part interview about the future of the conservative movement and the newly inaugurated President Barack Obama.

== Programming announcements and changes ==
Following the announcement on November 25, 2008, that Alan Colmes would leave Fox News primetime show Hannity & Colmes, it was decided that show would be succeeded by Hannity with Sean Hannity hosting solo.

From October 7, 2013, to September 22, 2017, most Hannity episodes were pre-recorded to air in the 10:00 p.m. time-slot, occasionally airing live if a major breaking news story was being covered. Following the move to 10:00 p.m., the 9:00 p.m. time-slot was filled by several programs, including The Kelly File, Tucker Carlson Tonight, and most recently The Five, which aired at 9:00 p.m. until September 25, 2017, when Hannity returned to its original time and got a graphics makeover.

== Location ==
Hannity is broadcast from Studio J at 1211 Avenue of the Americas (also known as the News Corp. Building), New York City. On March 20, 2018, Hannity temporarily relocated to Studio F from its original location in Studio J for construction. The program went back to renovated Studio J on June 5, 2018.

On January 2, 2024, Hannity announced that he had moved to Florida and would be broadcasting both his radio show and Hannity from his new home permanently.

== See also ==
- The Sean Hannity Show

Preceded by Jesse Watters Primetime	Hannity; 9:00 p.m. – 10:00 p.m.	Succeeded by Gutfeld!
