= Connell McShane =

American broadcaster, reporter and play-by-play commentator

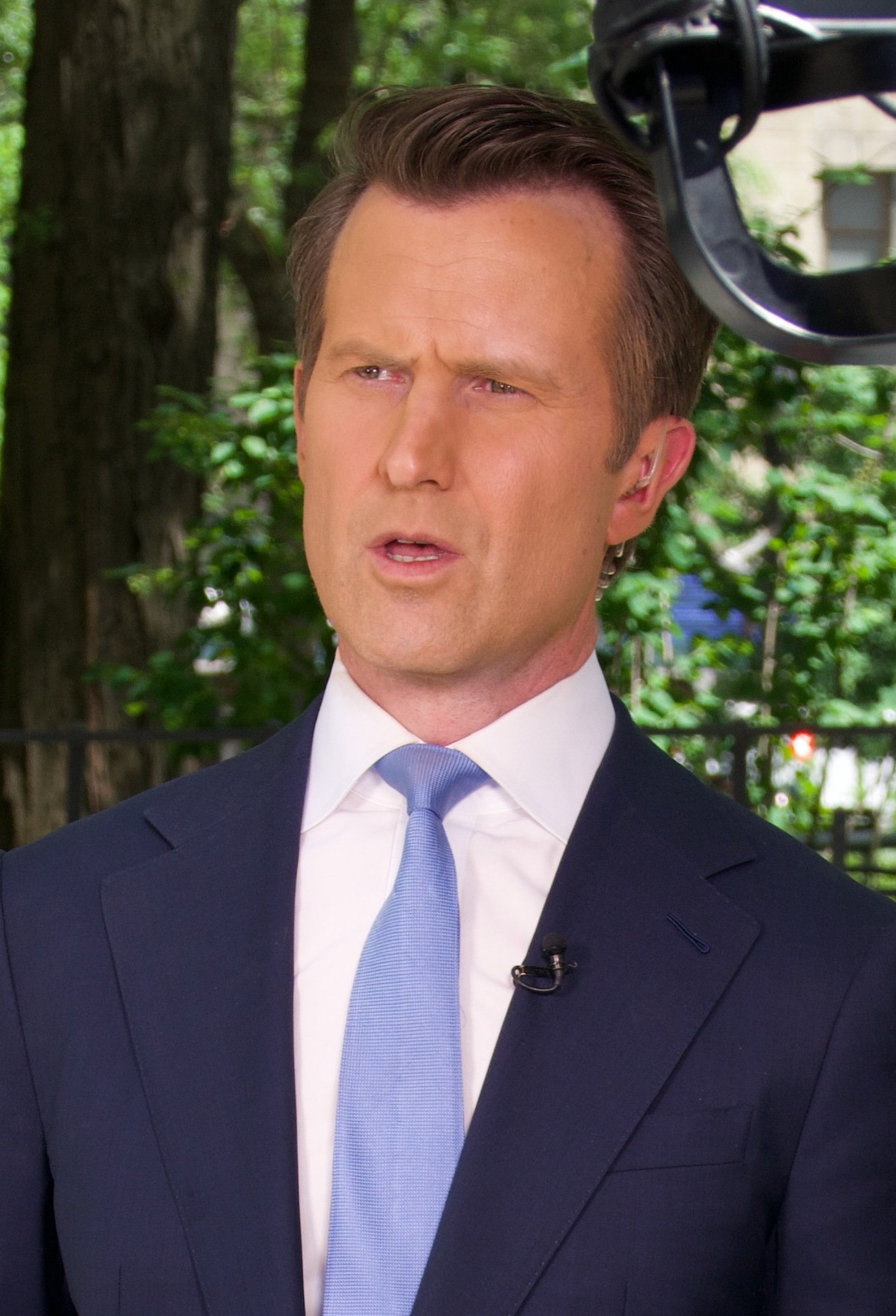
- Connell McShane in 2024.
- Born: August 4, 1977 (age 49)
- Education: Fordham University
- Occupations: Broadcaster, reporter and play-by-play commentator
- Years active: 1997–present
- Known for: Chief National Correspondent on Fox Business Network
- Spouse: Renee McShane
- Children: 3

Connell McShane (born August 4, 1977) is an American broadcaster, reporter and play-by-play commentator. He is the anchor of NewsNation Live with Connell McShane, a weekday afternoon news program seen on NewsNation. McShane previously anchored or hosted a number of programs, including Imus in the Morning, Fox Business Morning, and After the Bell.

== Early life ==
Connell McShane was born and raised on Long Island, New York. His father grew up in Kilcar, County Donegal, Ireland. He attended Fordham University where he graduated with a bachelor's degree in communication and media studies in 1999.

== Career ==
=== 1997–1999: Sports commentating ===
While studying at Fordham, he began working in sports reporting and was a sports broadcaster at WFUV from 1997 to 1999. In 1998, he interned for the Yankees Radio Network. He was also a play-by-play commentator for WBRK, where he broadcast games for the Pittsfield Mets.

=== 1999–2007: Bloomberg Radio, Bloomberg Television ===
After graduating from Fordham, McShane originally planned to become a sports commentator. However, in 1999 he became a desk assistant at Bloomberg Radio. This led to him becoming a local news reporter in New York City in 2000. One of his first major assignments as a reporter was covering the September 11 attacks for WBBR. While at Bloomberg Radio, McShane eventually transitioned into a role as a business reporter, reporting live from Nasdaq and the New York Stock Exchange. He was picked to co-anchor the syndicated morning show The First Word with Peter Schacknow. He later began working for Bloomberg Television, where he anchored On the Markets, Evening Edition, and Marketweek.

=== 2007–2023: Fox Business Network, Imus in the Morning ===
McShane joined Fox Business as a business reporter when it launched in 2007. He was then promoted to anchoring the network’s early morning program in 2008 alongside Jenna Lee. He became one of the business reporters for Don Imus' Imus in the Morning after Fox began simulcasting the program in 2009. McShane also filled in on one occasion for Charles McCord, who missed one of Imus in the Morning remote broadcasts due to illness. Beginning on May 9, 2011, McShane was news anchor on the show, a position he held until 2017. In 2010, McShane began co-hosting the 11am program Markets Now on Fox Business Network alongside Dagen McDowell. He was also a radio play-by-play broadcaster for ESPN's coverage of the 2013 Pinstripe Bowl.

McShane co-anchored After the Bell with Melissa Francis from 2018 to 2021. During the show, McShane reported live from swing states during the 2020 US presidential election. He announced his departure from Fox Business Network on May 8, 2023.

=== 2023–present: NewsNation ===
On September 12, 2023, Nexstar Media Group announced that McShane would join NewsNation as the weekday afternoon anchor for NewsNation Now. He made his debut on September 25, 2023.

== Personal life ==
McShane is an only child.

McShane married his wife Renee in 1999. As of 2007, they have three children.

== Filmography ==
List of television appearances by Connell McShane
Year	Title	Credited as	Notes
2022	The Faulkner Focus	Correspondent	
2022	Outnumbered	Correspondent	
2022	The Claman Countdown	Correspondent	
2021–2023	America Reports	Correspondent	
2021	Fox Business Tonight	Correspondent	
2021	Your World with Neil Cavuto	Correspondent	
2019	Cavuto Live	Co-host	
2018–2021	After the Bell	Co-anchor	Also appeared as a guest in 2015 and 2017
2018	Making Money with Charles Payne	Guest host	
2018	Kennedy Live		
2018	Happening Now	Guest host	
2018	The Evening Edit		
2017	Fox News Live	Guest host	Also appeared in archival footage
2017	Trish Regan Primetime		
2017	Fox Report with Jon Scott	Guest host	
2017	Fox & Friends	Guest host	
2016–2018	Maria Bartiromo's Wall Street	Panelist	
2014–2017	Cavuto on Business	Guest host	
2014	The Factor		
