= Imus (disambiguation) =

Imus is a city in the Philippines.

Imus may also refer to:

- Imus (surname), including a list of people with the name
- Imus Ranch, a cattle ranch in Ribera, New Mexico, U.S., 1998–2014
