= Vision Communications =

Vision Communications may refer to: .

- Vision Communications (Missouri), R.C. Amer's holding company of KADI-FM and KICK (AM) in Springfield, Missouri
- Vision Communications (New York), William Christian's broadcast holding company
