= Deirdre Imus =

American artist

- Occupations: Artist, writer, health advocate, radio personality
- Spouse: Don Imus (1994–2019, his death)
- Children: Wyatt Imus & Zachary Don

Deirdre Coleman Imus is an American artist, author, health advocate and radio personality and the founder and president of the Deirdre Imus Environmental Health Center, part of Hackensack University Medical Center (HUMC) in New Jersey, United States. She is also a co-founder and co-director of the Imus Cattle Ranch for Kids with Cancer, and the author of four books, Green This! Greening Your Cleaning, The Essential Green You!, Growing Up Green: Baby and Child Care and The Imus Ranch: Cooking for Kids and Cowboys.

On May 7, 2007, she was named to the board of directors of the National Autism Association. and on May 22, 2007, the National Audubon Society announced that Deirdre Imus was one of four women to receive the Society's annual Rachel Carson Award for Women in Conservation. In making the announcement, the Audubon Society cited her as "a pioneer inspiring parents and schools to clean using non-toxic products." In that same year Pace University bestowed her with an Honorary Doctorate of Humane Letters. Also in 2007, Deirdre was presented with the National Autism Association's BELIEVE award and was honored as a "Champion for Autism" by the Autism Education Foundation of MUJC in New Jersey. She was named Person of the Year in 2007 by Spectrum Magazine, a news source for families affected by autism. She was named "Woman of the Year" by the USO in 2008, and Glamour Magazine's Eco Heroes in 2009. In 2013 Deirdre received the Canary Award for her efforts toward creating a healthy and sustainable future for our children. She serves on the boards of several children's health organizations, including the National Autism Association, Safe Minds, Generation Rescue, SKIP of New York, East Harlem Council for Human Services, Inc., and Boriken Neighborhood Health Center.

Deirdre Imus has expressed concern over the chemicals used in commercial cleaning products and her book Green This! Greening Your Cleaning, published in April 2007, advocates the use of alternative cleaning products. Green This! Greening Your Cleaning contends that chemicals such as ammonia are harmful and she calls for "environmentally responsible" ways to clean around the house. She appeared on the NBC Today Show on April 6, 2007, to demonstrate the cleaning methods discussed in her book. A scheduled book tour was postponed, however, in the wake of the controversy surrounding the cancellation of the Imus in the Morning show.

Beginning in the late 1990s, she had some small acting roles as Deirdre Coleman, appearing in Form, Space & Murder in 1997. The following year, she appeared in Watchers Reborn and One Tough Cop, a movie about New York City detective Bo Dietl, who was a frequent guest on her husband's show. In 2001, she had a role in Directing Eddie.

== Personal life ==
In 1994, she married American radio and television personality Don Imus and frequently appeared on his program Imus in the Morning. They had two sons, Fredric Wyatt (nicknamed Wyatt, born July 3, 1998) and Zachary Don. They stayed together until Don's death on December 27, 2019.

In 1998, Don Imus and Deirdre founded the Imus Cattle Ranch for Kids with Cancer, a working cattle ranch near Ribera, New Mexico, 50 miles southeast of Santa Fe. The Ranch was a charitable organization for children with cancer, as well as siblings of SIDS victims.

Deirdre Imus graduated from Villanova University and is Roman Catholic. She is also a vegetarian.

== Books ==
- Imus, Deirdre, The Imus Ranch: Cooking for Kids and Cowboys. Rodale Press, 2004. ISBN 9781422392393
- Imus, Deirdre, Green This! Greening Your Cleaning. New York: Simon & Schuster, April, 2007. ISBN 9781416540557
- Imus, Deirdre, The Essential Green You! New York: Simon & Schuster, December, 2008. ISBN 9781416541257
- Imus, Deirdre, Growing Up Green: Baby and Child Care New York: Simon & Schuster, April, 2008. ISBN 9781416541240
