= Joe Crummey =

American radio talk show host

Joe Crummey is a conservative American talk show host. He hosted a local political talk show on WABC radio in New York City, in the 10 a.m. to noon slot between the syndicated Imus in the Morning and Rush Limbaugh programs, from October 11, 2010 to December 7, 2011.

Geraldo Rivera took over Crummey's 10 a.m. slot effective January 3, 2012, with regular WABC fill-in hosts Bernard McGuirk and Mark Simone substituting in the interim.

Earlier in his career, Crummey was a disc jockey at New York's WNBC and WAPP (where he briefly partnered on-air with Mark McEwen) in the 1980s, before moving to talk radio at stations in the West. For a brief era at KFI, he made use of a filtered mic to act if he were debating himself, where "Evil Joe" would take immoral or illogical positions to issues of the day. When he moved over to KABC from KFI, he jokingly referred to his former employers as "The Evil Station". From KFI he was hired by KABC in Los Angeles. Later, he worked for KFYI and KTAR in Phoenix.
