= Sid Rosenberg =

American journalist (born 1967)

- Rosenberg in 2026
- Born: Sidney Ferris Rosenberg; April 19, 1967 (age 59); Brooklyn, New York, U.S.
- Presenting career
- Show: Sid and Friends in the Morning Show
- Stations: 77 WABC (New York City)
- Time slot: 6:00–10:00 a.m., Monday–Friday
- Style: Sports/general talk radio
- Website: wabcradio.com/podcast/sid-and-friends/

Sidney Ferris Rosenberg (born April 19, 1967) is a conservative American radio personality. Currently the host of Sid and Friends in the Morning and Sid Sports Sunday on 77 WABC in New York City, he is known for his controversial and sarcastic humor as a host on many radio stations starting with, WAXY 790 The Ticket in Miami.

== Early life ==
Rosenberg's family is Jewish, his grandfather having changed the surname from Goldman to Coleman. He is a cousin of former Minnesotan U.S. senator Norm Coleman.

Rosenberg attended the University of Miami and Brooklyn College in 1984 and 1985 but dropped out of both. He then obtained an associate degree from Kingsborough Community College in 1990, followed by a B.A. in Business from Baruch College in 1992.

== Early career ==
Rosenberg's radio career started in West Palm Beach, Florida, where he hosted the syndicated sports radio program The Drive on Sports Fan Radio Network in the late 1990s, after starting as an Internet broadcast. In 2000, Rosenberg returned to New York City to co-host WNEW-FM's turbulent morning show, The Sports Guys. A year later, he joined the Imus in the Morning program. He shared the sports broadcasting duties with Warner Wolf before becoming the full-time sports reporter. He engaged in heated half-mock, half-serious disputes with the other members of the Imus cast, leading for example to an actual boxing bout with producer Bernard McGuirk. Several months after joining Imus, he became the co-host of the midday show on Imus' flagship station, WFAN. He would hold both broadcasting positions until 2005. For several years, he also hosted the radio pre-game shows for New York Giants home games.

WFAN executives accepted Rosenberg's resignation September 12, 2005, following his failure to show up to host the New York Giants' pre-game show having made an appearance for British men's magazine FHM in Atlantic City, New Jersey the previous day.

== Career ==
Rosenberg hosted his own morning show, WAXY 790 The Ticket in Miami, where he originally was paired with O.J. McDuffie, formerly a wide receiver with the Miami Dolphins. McDuffie resigned his position with the station in the summer of 2006.

Rosenberg's jokingly self-given middle name "Arthur" is a reference to former baseball player Dave Kingman. When Hall of Fame sportscaster Bob Murphy gave the lineups for the New York Mets, he would always give Kingman's name as "David Arthur Kingman"; Rosenberg continues this running gag on the Sports Guys by using Arthur as everybody's middle name.

=== Inflammatory television commentary ===
Rosenberg frequently made inflammatory remarks on the Imus show, which was simulcast on MSNBC cable television. Among other things, he said on-air that Venus Williams was an "animal," and that she and Serena Williams would be better suited for National Geographic magazine than for Playboy. He also said that "faggots play tennis" and that the U.S. women's national soccer team were "a bunch of juiced up dykes."

Rosenberg was fired from the Imus show after making crude remarks about Australian singer Kylie Minogue's breast cancer diagnosis. Chris Carlin replaced Rosenberg, although Rosenberg continued to call into the Imus program. As a substitute sportscaster on April 4, 2007, Rosenberg reported on Rutgers University's 59–46 loss the previous evening to the University of Tennessee, in the final game of the NCAA Women's Division I Basketball Championship. This served as a lead-in to Imus and other cast members, who made comments that resulted in the cancellation of the program one week later.

=== Radio broadcasting, 2005–present ===
==== Southern Florida ====
Rosenberg began working at Miami-based WAXY 790-The Ticket in November 2005. He and the station parted ways in March 2009. In September 2009, he joined South Florida radio station WQAM. He was fired in April 2012 following a DUI arrest and was replaced by Dan Sileo.

Rosenberg returned to the airwaves at WMEN 640AM on August 13, 2012. He was released by the station in December 2015 in what he called a cost-cutting move.

==== New York City ====
Rosenberg returned to WFAN on Saturday, February 6, 2010 to host a special Super Bowl preview show from Miami. On Saturday, March 27, 2010 he again returned to the radio station hosting a show in Port St. Lucie before the New York Mets faced the Washington Nationals. He also completed two weeks of fill-in work with Kimberly Jones, Marc Malusis and Anita Marks on WFAN in July 2010 from 10:00 a.m. to 1:00 p.m. for Joe Benigno and Evan Roberts, who themselves were filling in for Mike Francesa from 1:00 to 6:30 p.m. WFAN's Mark Chernoff told Newsday of Long Island's Neil Best that he was very impressed with Sid's return to the FAN, but that there was very little he could do to make the temporary hosting in New York anything more than temporary.

In 2011, Rosenberg became the weekday morning sports anchor for WFAN's sister station, 1010 WINS but left in 2012. That same year, Craig Carton welcomed Rosenberg back, who CBS had neglected to invite to WFAN's 25th Anniversary celebration.

In 2015, it was reported that Rosenberg would be filling in for Geraldo Rivera in August on 77 WABC.

On January 27, 2016, Rosenberg officially returned to New York radio as co-host of The Bernie and Sid Show of 77 WABC with Bernard McGuirk. On November 4, 2016, it was announced that he was replacing Warner Wolf as the Imus in the Morning sports contributor.

On March 8, 2018, Rosenberg and McGuirk signed contracts to replace the retiring Don Imus of the Imus in the Morning show.

On December 2, 2022, following McGuirk's death, Bernie and Sid in the Morning became known as Sid and Friends in the Morning.

On October 27, 2024, Rosenberg spoke at President Trump's rally at Madison Square Garden, railing against former Senator Hillary Clinton in particular and Democrats in general.

In March 2026, Rosenberg called New York City Mayor Zohran Mamdani an "America-hating, Jew hating, Radical Islam cockroach" in a post on the social network X attempting to turn President Trump against Mamdani. Rosenberg later deleted the post and apologized on-air for the remarks.

== Controversies ==
He called the New York mayor Zohran Mamdani a "rat fuck", "marxist", "terrorist".

== Personal life ==
He and his wife Danielle were married in 1992 and have two children. Rosenberg made his first trip to Israel in January 2024, in response to the October 7 attacks.
