= Bernard McGuirk =

American radio personality (1957–2022)

Bernard J. McGuirk (October 26, 1957 – October 5, 2022) was an American radio personality. He was host at WABC in New York City alongside Sid Rosenberg. He was born and raised in the Soundview, Bronx, New York City, where he worked in his younger years as a taxi driver.

== Background ==
McGuirk was an alum of Cardinal Hayes High School and graduated from College of Mount Saint Vincent in the Riverdale section of the Bronx, New York with a degree in communications in 1984. He worked in radio and television beginning in 1986. He was best known for his long run as the executive producer of Imus in the Morning, a radio program that was nationally syndicated from 1993 until the program ended with host Don Imus's retirement in 2018.

== Controversies ==
=== Tim Cook "religious bigot" controversy ===
On April 1, 2015, during the Imus in the Morning show on Fox Business, McGuirk called Apple CEO Tim Cook a "bigot hypocrite" for "running his mouth" about the subject of the religious freedom Indiana law passed the month prior.

McGuirk: There is a lot of hypocrisy. First of all, Governor Cuomo tells all his state employees don't go to Indiana but he's going to Cuba where gay marriage is illegal and they maybe throw you in jail. You have this hypocrite, this bigot hypocrite, Tim Cook, who is running his mouth about the whole thing.
McShane: The Apple CEO?
McGuirk: Yeah. He sells products to Iran. He sells products to Saudi Arabia where they execute people if they're gay.
McDowell: A hypocrite maybe, but a bigot?
McGuirk: A religious bigot, yeah. He won't allow these religious people to exercise their freedom.
McShane: That seems too strong to me.
McGuirk: It does seem strong but in my opinion it happens to be accurate. If he doesn't allow this Orthodox Jewish guy to refuse service...the point of the law is to allow him to exempt himself from a certain situation.
McShane: This will end up back in the Supreme Court somewhere.
McGuirk: And the governor of Connecticut. Meanwhile the state has the same law.
McShane: But I think there is a difference in the law in terms...there are small differences in these laws. Some of these state laws are just to protect you against the government not against another person. So there are differences in those state laws.
McGuirk: Gay rights and religious freedom are not mutually exclusive. They both can exist in the same universe and compromises have to be made. That's just the way we work things out in this country. Tim Cook has to put his money where his mouth is. If he really feels that way, stop marketing Apple products in Saudi Arabia, Iran, and Nigeria where they not only dump on women and treat them as second class citizens but as I said they would execute gay people.

=== Jill Carroll ===
On the Imus in the Morning show, McGuirk was not known to shy away from saying whatever was on his mind, and always in a heavily accented "Brooklyn cabdriver" deadpan that seemed both to amuse and horrify Imus in equal measure. Imus' sidekick, Charles McCord, often played the role of the instigator, doing his best to egg on McGuirk.

For example, after the release of The Christian Science Monitor reporter Jill Carroll, who was kidnapped in Iraq, McGuirk stated: "She strikes me as the kind of woman who would wear one of those suicide vests. You know, walk into the tent or try and sneak into the Green Zone.

=== Cardinals O'Connor and Egan ===
The son of Irish immigrants and an altar boy in his youth, McGuirk did impersonations of John Cardinal O'Connor and Edward Cardinal Egan (both Archbishops of New York) in which he "fashions an oversize FedEx envelope into a cone on his head ... Using a high-pitched Irish brogue ... the producer-as-cardinal said on the March 16 installment of the show that 'the only thing Hillary Clinton has in common with the late great President John Fitzgerald Kennedy, God rest his soul, is that they both enjoyed extramarital affairs with women.'"

=== U.S. President Barack Obama ===
Regarding Presidential aspirant Barack Obama, McGuirk stated: "He's a neophyte, no experience. It's all because he's half black, it's patronizing, he's Oprah's guy." After Imus tried to interrupt him, McGuirk went on again to say it was patronizing to support Obama, and referred to him as a "jug-eared neophyte".

=== Satanist controversy ===
On January 9, 2014, during a debate on Imus in the Morning about a group erecting a statue of Satan next to a sign of the Ten Commandments, McGuirk advocated that "They should be able to put the statue up, and then they should be shot right next to it, and then we take it down." McGuirk subsequently apologized, claiming that his comments were "rooted in ignorance".

=== Rutgers basketball controversy ===
McGuirk played a role in an on-air incident on April 4, 2007, that caused a nationwide controversy and ultimately led to both him and Imus being fired. During a discussion of the Rutgers University women's basketball team, Imus characterized the players as "rough girls with tattoos". McGuirk responded in his familiar "urban-speak" vernacular by referring to them as "hardcore hos". The ensuing "urban-speak" conversation involved Imus describing the girls as "nappy-headed hos" and McGuirk wondering if Imus meant to imply that the two teams looked like something out of Spike Lee's film School Daze, the "jigaboos versus the wannabes"; apparently referring to the two teams' differing appearances. Imus said "Yeah."

On April 11, 2007, MSNBC announced that it would immediately stop simulcasting the show. Originally, both CBS and MSNBC had announced a two-week suspension of the program. The next day, CBS fired Imus and canceled Imus in the Morning, effective immediately. CBS President and chief executive officer Leslie Moonves stated:

From the outset, I believe all of us have been deeply upset and revulsed by the statements that were made on our air about the young women who represented Rutgers University in the NCAA Women's Basketball Championship with such class, energy and talent. There has been much discussion of the effect language like this has on our young people, particularly young women of color trying to make their way in this society. That consideration has weighed most heavily on our minds as we made our decision.

The day before, CBS chairman Sumner Redstone said he trusted Moonves would "do the right thing", but didn't elaborate. McGuirk was noticeably absent the following week when other Imus contributors, including newsman Charles McCord and sportscaster Chris Carlin, were on the air with the WFAN replacement team of Mike Francesa and Chris "Mad Dog" Russo. McGuirk was fired by WFAN on April 19, 2007.

== After WFAN ==
On April 26, 2007, McGuirk appeared on the Fox News Channel program Hannity & Colmes to discuss his dismissal. On May 14, 2007, he reappeared on the program to debate Al Sharpton on the events that led to the cancellation of the Imus in the Morning program.

On May 2, 2007, McGuirk made a guest appearance on Jay Severin's radio program. Although there was some speculation in the media that the sometimes controversial station might be auditioning McGuirk for a job, executives of WTKK denied that this was the case. Boston talk radio station WRKO scheduled McGuirk to appear as a co-host with Thomas Finneran from May 23, 2007, to May 25, 2007, but canceled the appearance reportedly due to public criticism.

McGuirk was also a weekly guest on The O'Reilly Factor, appearing on the segment What the Heck Just Happened? with Greg Gutfeld.

== Return to WABC ==
McGuirk returned to the airwaves with Imus on December 3, 2007. Along with serving as the executive producer, he also had an on-air role. The program was heard on WABC in New York as well being nationally syndicated on stations owned by or affiliated with the ABC Radio Network and was also seen on the Fox Business Network. McGuirk was one of several people who rotated hosting of the post-Imus midday slot from May to October 2010 on WABC, a job that eventually went to Joe Crummey.

In early 2016, McGuirk partnered with Sid Rosenberg to host a morning radio talk show on WABC, called The Bernie and Sid Show, which became the replacement show when Imus retired on March 29, 2018. The show aired for more than four years, until McGuirk's death.

== Personal life and death ==
McGuirk was married with two children and resided in Long Beach, New York.

In 2021, McGuirk was diagnosed with advanced prostate cancer. According to WABC personality Curtis Sliwa, McGuirk continued to work despite going through chemotherapy, and dealing with bouts of appendicitis and pneumonia. McGuirk died on October 5, 2022, of cancer.
