= Imus (surname) =

Imus is a surname. Notable people with the surname include:

- Don Imus (1940–2019), American television and radio host
- Fred Imus (1942–2011), American radio host and the younger brother of radio talk show host Don Imus
- Deirdre Imus (born 1964), American author and wife of Don Imus
