= Warner Wolf =

American sports broadcaster

- Born: Warner William Wolf; November 11, 1937 (age 89); Washington, D.C., U.S.
- Occupation: Sportscaster
- Years active: 1961–2016
- Spouse: Sue
- Children: 2
- Parent(s): Jack Wolf; Rosemary Wolf

Warner William Wolf (born November 11, 1937) is an American television and radio sports broadcaster, perhaps best known as a local news sports anchor in Washington, D.C., and New York City, and for his catchphrase "Let's go to the videotape!" He was also known for referring to the “foul pole” as the ”fair pole.”

== Early life and career ==
Wolf was born in Washington, D.C., the son of Rosemary and Jack Wolf. His father, an actor and comedian who briefly worked as a member of Ted Healy's "stooge" act, was Jewish and his mother converted to Judaism. His earliest experience in broadcasting was on the intercom system of Calvin Coolidge High School in Washington, D.C., in the 1950s. His upbeat, entertaining patter that was to become his trademark made his sports report a welcome treat for the kids. During this period he worked part-time at Baker's Shoe Store downtown, as a salesman. Many customers must have been puzzled at the ballpark hawker's refrain of, "Get your hot dogs, get your hot doggies here" coming from the back storeroom. He was simply entertaining the staff and the customers, something he was to continue throughout his long career.

Wolf began as a radio broadcaster on April 1, 1961, doing news, weather, and sports for WLSI-AM in Pikeville, Kentucky, under the name Ken Wolf. He then moved on to radio jobs in Martinsburg, West Virginia, at WEPM, and Washington, D.C., at WTOP (AM) before landing a sports television role in 1965 at WTOP-TV (now WUSA) in Washington. There he became very well known and popular as the news sports anchor; he also did play-by-play announcing of local college and professional sports. He retained his job as sports director at WTOP (AM) throughout the 1960s, even announcing occasionally on radio broadcasts of Washington Senators games.

== ABC Sports ==
In 1976, Wolf gained an ABC Sports network role, working on Monday Night Baseball telecasts and as a host for coverage of football and the Olympics. Wolf's reception in those jobs was mixed, and he decided that he was best at the local news sports anchor role.

== WABC-TV and WCBS-TV ==
Still under contract with ABC, Wolf returned to local sportscasting with a job at WABC-TV in New York in 1976, and then in 1980 moved to rival station WCBS-TV. His move to WCBS-TV resulted in a lawsuit, American Broadcasting Co. v. Wolf, in which ABC alleged that Wolf failed to negotiate in good faith and sought specific performance of their contract which would have kept Wolf off the air for two years. The New York Court of Appeals rejected ABC's attempt to bar Wolf from working in his field, although they permitted ABC to seek relief in the form of monetary damages. He also broadcast live sports reports for Israeli television during the 1991 Gulf War.

== Return to WUSA-TV and Imus in the Morning ==
Wolf returned to Washington as the sports anchor at WUSA, the former WTOP-TV, in June 1992. Wolf succeeded Glenn Brenner, who died earlier that year and had replaced Wolf back in 1977 when he joined ABC Sports. He was dismissed in August 1995. Between November 1995 and December 1996, Wolf was the guest host of The Tony Kornheiser Show on Thursdays on WTEM and sometimes he also flew to New York as a substitute sports anchor on Imus in the Morning when the regular sports anchor, Mike Breen, was away. Because of his work on Imus in the Morning and Don Imus' recommendation on the air continuously, Wolf went back to WCBS-TV as the sports anchor on February 3, 1997 (the most recent of his replacements at WCBS, Bernie Smilovitz, had returned to WDIV in Detroit after having been caught in WCBS' infamous 1996 mass firings). During his tenure at WCBS he began uttering his famous phrase "Let's go to the videotape!" on a regular basis to switch to a video of the game he was reporting on.

During this time he also continued to do some work in radio, giving sports reports on the nationally syndicated Imus in the Morning program. Wolf broke the news of the September 11, 2001 attacks on the Imus show, when he saw the World Trade Center on fire from his Lower Manhattan apartment. Wolf also covered the story for WCBS-TV (where he was working at the time).

He stayed there until May 2004, returning to WABC (AM) in 2006 as the sports reporter for Curtis and Kuby, and continuing, with a two-week hiatus, on the Imus in the Morning program following Don Imus's arrival at WABC (AM). He served as Imus's sports contributor until November 3, 2016, when Imus decided to replace Wolf with Sid Rosenberg. Wolf sued Imus alleging age discrimination.

== Departure from WCBS-TV ==
On May 27, 2004, Wolf was fired by WCBS-TV general manager Lew Leone three months before his contract expired, and replaced by a much younger anchor, Chris Wragge. The day after his firing, his picture covered half the front page of the New York Daily News with the other half being covered by the headline "Wolf Fans Raise a Howl".

A few months after his firing, which generated much public outcry, Wolf was hired by radio station WABC and he appeared weekday mornings with Curtis Sliwa & Ron Kuby as well as Mark Simone's Saturday morning radio program. When Imus in the Morning returned to WABC in December 2007, Wolf was not the sports anchor: Tony Powell took that position. But after several weeks Wolf returned to his old position and continued as the morning sports anchor for the Imus in the Morning show. Wolf also hosted a Saturday sports talk show on 1050 ESPN Radio. Wolf modified his trademark "Let's go to the videotape!" to "Let's go to the audiotape!"

Wolf's final day with the Imus show was November 4, 2016. He stayed at WABC until December 3, when his current contract expired.

== Arrest ==
On February 7, 2019, Wolf turned himself in and was arrested after he broke letters off a sign at the entrance of Classics Plantation Estates in East Naples, Florida, according to deputies at the Collier County Sheriff's Office. Wolf, a resident of the community, expressed his opinion at homeowners association meetings that the word "plantation" was racist. Surveillance video on November 30, 2018, showed a man matching Wolf's description removing the word "plantation" from the sign with a tool. Wolf faced a felony charge of criminal mischief, according to the arrest report. Wolf told a radio talk show audience the following month that prosecutors "likely felt the intent was not criminal" so only required that he pay restitution for damages.

== Other appearances ==
Wolf played himself in the film Rocky IV and has made several other cameo appearances. He is the author of the books Let's Go to the Videotape and Give Me a Break. Wolf is currently heard Mondays at 7:35 am on "Len Berman and Michael Riedel in the Morning" on WOR AM-710 in New York.

== Books ==
- Wolf, Warner; Taaffe, William (1983). Gimme a Break! Warner Wolf on Sports. McGraw-Hill. ISBN 0-07071-537-8.
- Wolf, Warner; Weisman, Larry (2000). Let's Go to the Videotape: All the Plays and Replays from My Life in Sports. Warner Books. ISBN 0-44652-559-6.
