= KICK (AM) =

- Springfield, Missouri; United States
- Frequency: 1340 kHz
- Branding: 1340 AM

Programming
- Format: Conservative talk radio
- Affiliations: Salem Radio Network

Ownership
- Owner: Karen and R.C. Amer; (Vision Communications)
- Sister stations: KADI-FM

History
- First air date: 1950
- Former call signs: KICK (1950–1991); KIDS (1991–2005); KADI (2005–2015)

Technical information
- Licensing authority: FCC
- Facility ID: 34563
- Class: C
- Power: 1,000 watts
- Transmitter coordinates: 37°5′34″N 93°15′59″W
- Repeater: K222CT 92.3 FM (Springfield)

Links
- Public license information: Public file; LMS
- Webcast: Listen Live

KICK (1340 AM) is a conservative talk radio station in Springfield, Missouri. The station is owned by Karen and R.C. Amer, through holding company Vision Communications, along with its FM partner KADI-FM.

== Programming ==
The station features a mostly syndicated lineup, carrying affiliations with Salem Radio Network's "The Answer" conservative talk lineup (providing Morning in America with Bill Bennett, Michael Medved and Dennis Prager), Fox News Radio (carrying Brian Kilmeade), The Dave Ramsey Show, ABC News Radio (top-of-hour news updates), and the USA Radio Network (weekend programs). Local programs include "The Shopping Show" (home shopping), "Business Spotlight" and "The Business Rockstars" (both of which are brokered shows). Since January 20, 2017, the station has begun featuring more local programming, including a morning show with long-time Springfield radio personality Woody P. Snow.

== History ==
Logo as KADI

The station was previously known as KICK and signed on in 1950. Charles McCord, a cast member of Imus in the Morning, worked at the station in the 1960s (his first job in radio) before moving on to larger markets. The station changed call signs to KIDS on July 5, 1991.

When Vision Communications first went on the air in June 1990, the AM station was off the air, and the FM station was small, employing approximately eight people. Chicago-based Snowmen Broadcasting Inc. owned it and Amer was a sales representative.

On October 1, 1991, KICK switched to children's radio. The format would last until late August 1994, when the station went silent.

In the years between, Amer moved into the role of sales manager, then station manager, before purchasing KADI. The purchase was finalized in 2000, but Vision Communications had a management agreement with KADI since 1994, the year Amer formed the company. In 2001, Amer obtained rights to 1340 AM KADI (formerly 1340 AM KIDS, which was previously 1340 KICK).

Staff grew to the 20 there today, and sister station KADI-FM reached the top spot in Arbitron’s ratings for contemporary Christian stations in the 18- to 34-year-old women category, its target market. 1340 AM KICK has also grown in listenership since adopting the conservative talk format.

In summer 2016, KICK began simulcasting at 92.3 FM, K222CT. On January 20, 2017, long-time Springfield radio voice Woody P. Snow began hosting a local morning show and the station rebranded as "92.3 FM KICK".
