= Charles McCord =

American former news anchor and radio personality

Charles McCord (born c. 1942 in Joplin, Missouri) is an American former news anchor and radio personality most notable for his association with Imus in the Morning for over three decades.

== Career ==
In his early career, McCord worked as a copy writer for advertisements. He landed work as a radio newsman in 1963 at KICK in Springfield, Missouri, followed by WFAA in Dallas, Texas. This was followed by stints at WWDC and WTOP in Washington, D.C. In December 1971, while a rookie newsman at WNBC in New York City, McCord was assigned to work on Imus in the Morning, the morning show for newcomer Don Imus of WGAR in Cleveland. McCord went on to become the show's newscaster and writer. In 1975, McCord moved to NBC's News and Information Service, a 24-hour radio network, which lasted until 1977. In that year, Imus was fired and returned to Cleveland.

Following Imus' return to WNBC in 1979, McCord rejoined the show, signing a contract with the station's news department as well as a comedy writer for the programming department. In 1981, McCord co-wrote, with Imus, the book God's Other Son, a mock biography of Imus's corrupt preacher character, Rev. Billy Sol Hargis.

In 1988, when WNBC signed off and WFAN signed on, McCord was retained.

McCord continued to serve as the news anchor for WFAN's morning show for several months after the departure of Imus, and then, after over thirty years at the 660 kHz frequency in New York, left WFAN at the end of August when the contract between Imus and WFAN was settled.

McCord rejoined Imus in the Morning when the program returned to radio on WABC on December 3, 2007.

McCord's responsibilities on the Imus program included news reporting and writing comedy material for celebrity impersonators Larry Kenney and Rob Bartlett, as well as writing the questions host Don Imus would ask his guests during interviews. In character, he was usually the straight man and occasionally an Imus sycophant or antagonist.

McCord announced his retirement in April 2011; his retirement became effective May 6.
