= KADI-FM =

Christian contemporary hit radio station in Springfield, Missouri

Republic, Missouri; United States
- Broadcast area: Springfield metropolitan area
- Frequency: 99.5 MHz
- Branding: 99.5 KADI FM

Programming
- Language: English
- Format: Christian contemporary hit radio

Ownership
- Owner: Karen and R.C. Amer; (Vision Communications)
- Sister stations: KICK

History
- First air date: June 18, 1990

Technical information
- Licensing authority: FCC
- Facility ID: 60709
- Class: A
- ERP: 6,000 watts
- HAAT: 100 meters (330 ft)
- Transmitter coordinates: 37°9′54.00″N 93°23′44.00″W

Links
- Public license information: Public file; LMS
- Webcast: Listen live
- Website: kadi.com

KADI-FM (99.5 MHz) is a FM Christian contemporary hit radio station in Republic, Missouri serving the Springfield, Missouri area. The station is owned by Karen and R.C. Amer through its holding company Vision Communications.

KADI-FM was also the call sign for a progressive rock station in St. Louis, MO, located first at 96.5, then later at 96.3 on the FM dial. The station was identified as KADI from 1959 until 1987, when the call sign were changed to KRJY.

== History ==
KADI first went on the air as "99.5 KADI" at 3 p.m. on June 18, 1990. The station employed approximately eight people; Chicago-based Snowmen Broadcasting Inc. owned it and RC Amer was a sales representative.

In the years between, Amer moved into the role of sales manager, then station manager, before purchasing KADI through Vision Communications Inc., a company Amer owns with his wife, Karen. The purchase was finalized in 2000, but Vision Communications had a management agreement with KADI since 1994, the year Amer formed the company.

Staff grew to the 20 there today, and KADI reached the top spot in Arbitron’s ratings for contemporary Christian stations in the 18- to 34-year-old women category, its target market.

KADI was known as "The All New 99 Hit FM" from 2005 through April 2016. In 2015, the station celebrated its 25th anniversary and utilized "Celebrating 25 years" in much of their advertising and commercial bumpers.

On April 25, 2016, KADI returned to its original moniker "99.5 KADI" and slightly modified their slogan from "Springfield, Missouri's #1 Christian Hit Music Station" to "Today's #1 Christian Hit Music".

== Recent growth ==
Some of the station’s biggest points of pride are in its community involvement. The station and its listeners have taken on causes from the Good Samaritans Boys Ranch to Ozarks Food Harvest. KADI has sponsored the annual Children’s Miracle Network Radiothon, which raised more than $30,000 in 2006. The station has also sponsored Relay for Life events for the American Cancer Society. KADI and was the first Springfield media outlet to promote and broadcast live from the annual "I Love America" Celebration hosted by James River Assembly of God every Fourth of July.

KADI has helped bring some of the top names in Christian music to Springfield, including tobymac, Casting Crowns, Skillet, MercyMe, and The Newsboys. KADI is known within the industry for breaking new bands and artists like Sanctus Real, Superchic, BarlowGirl, and Decemberadio.

== Current on-air personalities ==
Current on-air personalities include RC Amer and Mark Hill.

== Former on-air personalities ==
Former on-air personalities include Rod Kittleman, Josh "The Kid" Wellborn, Michael “Andy Collins” Smith, Matt Wilkie, Gary McElyea, Steve Largent, Michael Gibson, and Brenton Miles (Host of the nationally syndicated "Sunday Morning Drive", also a recording artist and lead singer of Cor Captis).
