= Imus Ranch =

Cattle ranch in New Mexico

Coordinates: 35°22′43.8″N 105°24′16.4″W

The Imus Ranch was a working cattle ranch of nearly 4,000 acres (1,600 ha) located in Ribera, New Mexico, 50 miles (80 km) southeast of Santa Fe. Between 1998–2014, it was the site of a non-profit charitable program for seriously ill children, founded by long-time radio personality Don Imus and his wife, Deirdre. The charitable organization sought to ensure the continuity of the lives of children afflicted with cancer or serious blood diseases. The charity's goal was to provide children ages 10–17 with an experience of living life on a functioning cattle ranch free of charge, to build up the child's self-confidence and sense of accomplishment, in the company of similar children facing serious illness. In later years, it also opened to siblings of SIDS victims. It was incorporated in New York State and registered as a non-profit organization under subsection 501(c)(3) of the United States Internal Revenue Code. It closed following the 2014 season.

The former ranch property was initially offered for sale for $32 million in October 2014. Not having sold by 2017, the property was put up for auction by Thomas Industries, Inc., an industrial auction house with a specialty in the auction of printing companies. The property was listed for sale as a combined acreage of the foundation, the personal property of the Imuses, and state leased adjoining land totaling almost 3,000 acres. The deadline for auction was originally set for June 15, 2017, with a minimum bid of $5 million. The property was sold to Patrick Gottsch, owner of RFD-TV, in April 2018 for $12.5 million. RFD-TV used the ranch as a production facility for its Western shows. The Gottsch family sold off its Western and rodeo assets to Teton Ridge Inc. in 2024, after Gottsch's death.

A portion of the historic Santa Fe Trail passes through the property.

== Facilities ==
The ranch contained a village of eight buildings constructed to emulate an Old West town, including a general store, a "marshal's office", and a "saloon" (actually an infirmary where the young guests receive their medications at the saloon's "bar"). The main ranch house is a 14,000 sq ft (1,300 m^{2}) adobe hacienda with Native American rugs and rustic chandeliers in the great room. It had five bedrooms for the ten children who attended each week in the summer, a library, and a dining hall which served only vegetarian meals. The design was largely under the direction of Deirdre Imus at a cost of construction placed at more than $25 million.

There were bunk houses for doctors, other medical staff and ranch hands. The Hackensack University Medical Center provided physicians, nurses, and guidance counselors who attended the ranch sessions.

== Activities ==
For seven days, the children were expected to perform chores and tasks as if they were cowboys, such as caring for horses, in order to gain self-esteem. The ranch operated all year but hosted children only when school was not in session, in eight one-week sessions. Nearly half the children were from minority groups; 45% were black.

During a typical day, the children performed chores beginning early in the morning, such as feeding the various ranch animals, watering plants, gathering eggs, and saddling horses for a two-hour ride led by the Imuses. Recreation included swimming, board games, and pool. In a concession to the serious health needs of the campers, the ranch also had qualified personnel present to treat medical needs.

During the summer months, Imus broadcast his nationally syndicated radio program, Imus in the Morning, from a studio at the ranch. Occasionally, children attending the ranch appeared on the program along with his wife, Deirdre, and son, Wyatt.

== History ==
Imus, who was raised on an Arizona ranch, became interested in helping children stricken with cancer after he participated in a New York radio telethon in 1988, raising money for a charity assisting such children. After his marriage to Deirdre Coleman in 1994, the couple decided to build a western ranch where cancer-stricken children could regain their self-esteem by engaging in authentic ranch work. Deirdre Imus said in an American Profile magazine interview, "After working with these kids, we noticed a common theme: they had cancer but they were like normal kids, except they lost their self-esteem. We found no one was actually restoring their self-esteem or dignity."

Initially, the Imuses used more than $1 million of their money to purchase 810 acres (3.3 km^{2}) for the ranch in 1998. The ranch cost almost $25 million to construct, raised through a public foundation they established. The ranch cost $1.8 million annually to operate.

== Controversies ==
In March 2005, a Wall Street Journal reporter wrote an article critical of the ranch and the amount of money spent on each child. In 2006 the ranch spent $2.5 million on 90 children who stayed at ranch, or $28,000 per child. Accusations of accounting irregularities and personal use of the charity's assets were investigated by both the Attorney General of New Mexico, Patricia Madrid, and the New York State Attorney General, Eliot Spitzer. No charges were filed in New Mexico. New York closed its investigation on March 24, 2005.

== Fundraising sources ==
The Imus Ranch's annual operating cost of $1.8 million was raised by various corporate sponsors and individual contributions, enabling the youth to attend at no charge.

=== Corporate sponsors ===
Numerous large corporations donated significantly to the ranch. Major donors included Reader's Digest, for which the ranch's "locale" was named, Unilever, and Wrangler Jeans, among others. General Motors donated vehicles for use on the ranch. Buildings at the ranch were named for major corporate donors.

=== Radiothon ===
Each spring beginning in 1990, WFAN conducted the WFAN Radiothon to benefit children's causes. The Radiothon was subsequently conducted on WABC radio in New York. As of 2005, the Radiothon raised more than $30 million for the ranch, along with Tomorrows Children's Fund and the CJ Foundation for SIDS.

=== Imus Ranch Foods ===
Organic food items and cleaning products were sold in large markets and online under the now-defunct "Imus Ranch Foods" label. All after-tax profits from the sale of these products were donated to the ranch.

=== Books ===
In 2004, Deirdre Imus wrote a book, The Imus Ranch: Cooking for Kids and Cowboys, published by Rodale, Inc. in Emmaus, Pennsylvania. All after-tax profits from the sale of the book have been donated to the ranch. On April 10, 2007, a second book by Deirdre Imus, Greening Your Cleaning, was published by Simon & Schuster.

=== Records ===
The Imus Ranch Record, a country music CD, was released in September 2008. A New York Times critic called it "pairings of artists and material that are inspired, and often inspiring, and nothing if not eclectic". Sales of the album benefited the ranch. Artists who agreed to record for the project include Willie Nelson, Vince Gill, Dwight Yoakam, Patty Loveless, Randy Travis, Little Richard, and Lucinda Williams.

== Closure ==
In his broadcast on September 9, 2014, Imus announced the discontinuation of the ranch program, after 16 years of operation, due to his "health and other issues". He said the property would be sold with proceeds going to a 501(c)(3) charitable foundation. In October 2014, the ranch was offered for sale, with an asking price of $32 million. After not selling for almost three years even when the price was reduced to $19.9 million, the closed property was scheduled for auction on June 15, 2017, at a starting bid of $5 million. The ranch was finally sold in April 2018 to Patrick Gottsch (Imus's former employer at RFD-TV and the founder of Rural Media Group) for $12.5 million.
