= SKIP of New York =

Non-profit agency

Sick Kids need Involved People (SKIP) of New York, Inc. is a 501(c)(3) not-for profit agency for families who want to care for their chronically ill, medically fragile, or developmentally disabled children. SKIP is an advocacy and service agency that helps families who have seriously ill children access the necessary resources and support to enable them to live at home with their families. SKIP helps set in place the health insurance and services required for these children and serves as collaborative and innovative stewards to these families and children as they navigate the health care system. It insures that families remain equal partners with professionals in determining their children's needs.
