= Rob Bartlett =

American actor

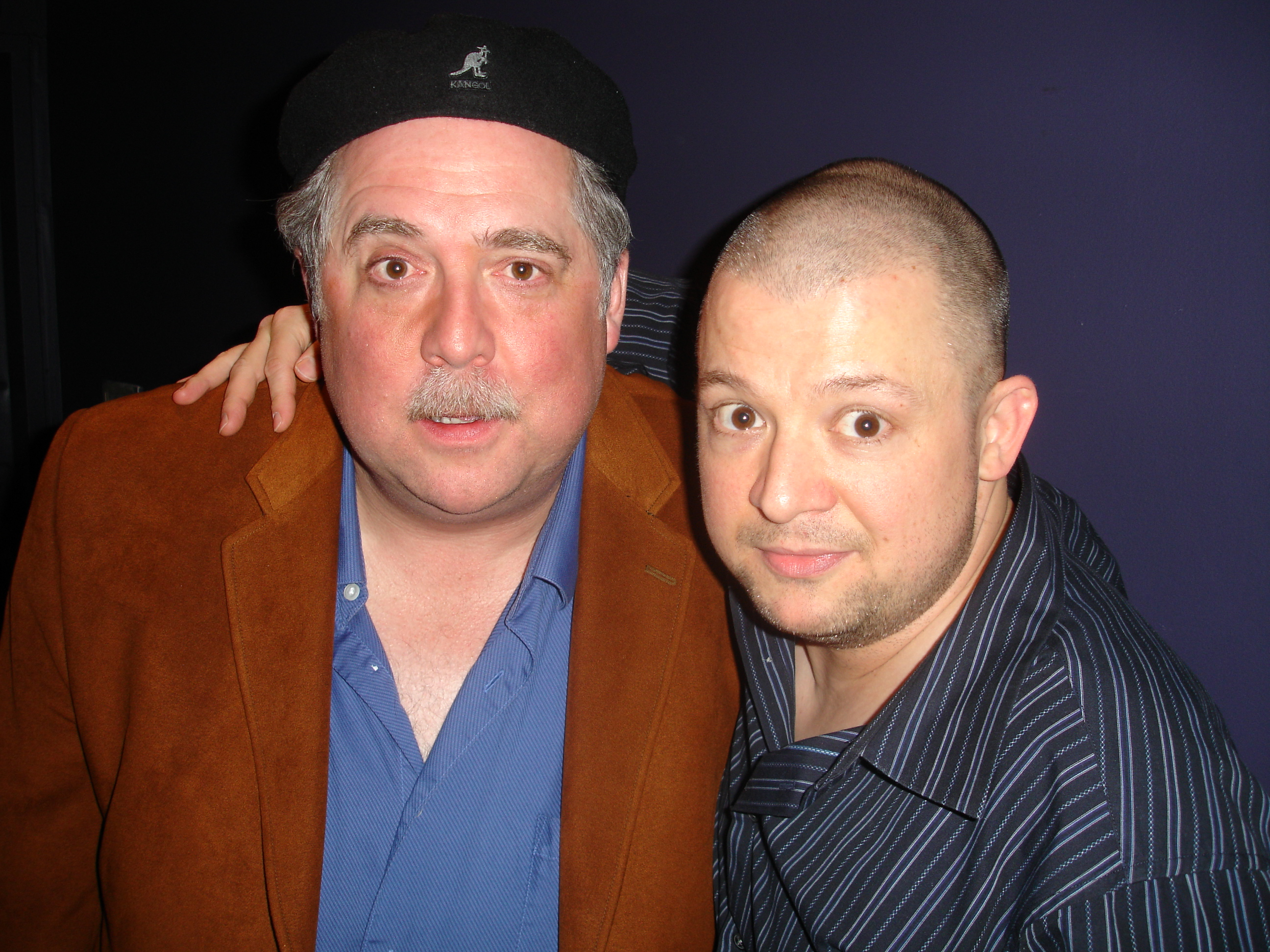
- Bartlett (left) with Jim Norton (right) at Carolines on Broadway, 2006
- Born: Robert James Bartlett; May 18, 1957 (age 69); Brooklyn, New York, U.S.
- Occupations: Film, theatre, and television actor; writer; impressionist; comedian
- Spouse: Sharon Bartlett
- Children: 3

Robert James Bartlett (born May 18, 1957) is an American comedian, actor, impressionist, and writer, who gained widespread fame on the radio show Imus in the Morning.

== Imus in the Morning ==
Bartlett appeared on the Imus in the Morning show beginning in the spring of 1987, first on New York City's WNBC-AM (660) radio then WFAN-AM, WABC-AM (770) radio as a regular writer and performer until the program's final broadcast on March 29, 2018. His earlier characters included Tom Carvel, Manuel Antonio Noriega, fictional comedians "Shecky Bhuta' and "Buddy" Miyagi", In the years on the show, some of his characters included: The Godfather, Andrew Dice Clay, Dr. Phil McGraw, Rush Limbaugh, Paula Deen, Larry King, Bill Clinton, Gary Busey, Hulk Hogan, Brian Wilson (of the Beach Boys), Ringo Starr, Bob Dylan, Yoko Ono, and Rodrigo Duterte. Not all of his characters consist of celebrity caricatures. One long-running recurring character was named Blind Mississippi White Boy Pig Feets Dupris, an old blues musician from Louisiana. His first character on the show was 'Sal Monella', a Brooklyn 'Gavonne', whose 'Night Before Christmas in Brooklyn' poem has become a holiday tradition for the past 30 years.

== Career ==
Bartlett started in stand-up comedy at Richard M. Dixon's White House Inn, a talent showcase club on Long Island. While working there, he met Eddie Murphy, and together formed two-thirds of the improvisational trio The Identical Triplets. After the two separated, he headlined at the Sands Hotel and Casino in Las Vegas, Tropicana Casino & Resort Atlantic City, Mohegan Sun and Foxwoods Resort Casino. He also appeared as a stand-up comedian on the MTV Half Hour Comedy Hour, Standup Spotlight on VH1 and on Late Night with David Letterman and Conan O'Brien. For a brief stint in 1993, Bartlett was one of the three original hosts of the World Wrestling Federation's Monday Night Raw, along with Randy 'Macho Man' Savage and Vince McMahon. His commentary was poorly received, as he had little knowledge of the wrestling business. His final appearance on the professional wrestling program was April 19, 1993 and was replaced by Bobby Heenan.

He is also a stage actor. He made his Broadway debut in More to Love, which he wrote and starred in, with Dana Reeve and Joyce Van Patten. In 1999 he starred in Tabletop, for which he received a Drama Desk Award. His Broadway roles include Amos Hart in Chicago the Musical, Herman in Sweet Charity with Christina Applegate, originated the role of Mr. Mushnik in the Broadway production of Little Shop of Horrors, Speed in the Nathan Lane/Matthew Broderick revival of Neil Simon's The Odd Couple.

On Network Television, Bartlett had a recurring role as Defense Attorney Milton Schoenfeld on Law & Order SVU, where, among his clients were Margo Kidder and Henry Winkler. He also played 'Troy the Security Guard' in the series 'Ugly Betty'. He guest-starred in a three-episode story arc as Bond Attorney, Bernie Bucovitz, on the final season of The Good Wife.

Rob wrote and starred in the Public Television special, Rob Bartlett's Not For Profit T.V. Special, produced by Connecticut Public Television (CPTV), was nominated for five Emmy Awards and won for Best Writing and Best Entertainment Program.

He was one of the writers and performers of 'The Ruthless Spectator' Sketch Comedy Website, and 'Ruthless Spectator Presents', a sketch comedy series created from the website, on Amazon Prime Video.

He was co-writer and star of 'Dr. Mantis Insect Analyst', an animated short in which he voiced the character of 'Fred the Caterpillar'. 'Mantis' won many laurels on the Domestic and International Film Festival Circuits and won 'Best Animated Short' in the Nice Film Festival in 2018.

He was also the voice of Marty the Dog in the hit animated children's show Kenny the Shark.

His feature film roles include Table One, Spin the Bottle, voiced Boss Baker Bunny in the animated film "The Easter Egg Adventure", and portrayed Rick the Cantanierous Nightclub Owner in 'All in Time"

In 2011, Bartlett returned to Broadway in the revival of How to Succeed in Business Without Really Trying, starring Daniel Radcliffe. Bartlett played the dual roles of 'Twimble' and 'Wally Womper'. .

On the final season of Elementary in Summer 2019, Bartlett played the recurring character of 'Captain Bill Dwyer' in a 5-Episode Story Arc.

Bartlett continues to make appearances in venues throughout the United States.

He is an advocate, fundraiser, board member, and trustee of The Long Island Crohn's and Colitis Foundation. Both he and one of his sons suffer from Crohn's.

== Personal ==
Bartlett attended Alfred University in New York State during the late '70s. He lives on Long Island with his wife Sharon and their three sons.
