= Dagen McDowell =

American journalist

- Born: Mary Dagen McDowell; January 7, 1969 (age 57); Brookneal, Virginia, US
- Education: Wake Forest University (BA)
- Occupations: Business news anchor, TV personality, accountant
- Years active: 1996–present
- Spouse: Jonas Max Ferris (m. 2005)

Mary Dagen McDowell (born January 7, 1969) is an American anchor and co-host of The Bottom Line and The Big Money Show on Fox Business as well as a commentator and guest host on Fox News.

== Education ==
A native of Campbell County, Virginia, from a family of Irish background, she grew up in Virginia and attended St. Catherine's School in Richmond. McDowell graduated from Wake Forest University with a degree in art history.

== Career ==
McDowell began her career as a financial journalist at the Institutional Investor's Newsletter Division.

=== Fox News ===
McDowell co-hosted Mornings with Maria on Fox Business from its inception in 2015 until 2023. She also appeared on Imus in the Morning prior to Imus' death in 2019, and was a weekly panelist for Cashin' In (she has won the Cashin' In Challenge three times, in 2013, 2014, and 2015, defeating the other three panelists, all of whom are professional money managers). McDowell is regularly asked to provide her opinions about economics and politics on Fox News. She served as a panelist on Cavuto on Business, and became the host of Bulls and Bears in 2016 following predecessor Brenda Buttner's eventually fatal cancer diagnosis. She participates regularly in Outnumbered, The Five, and Gutfeld!. She also worked for TheStreet.

In December 2022 Fox Business named McDowell co-host of a new show called The Bottom Line alongside Sean Duffy. The show debuted on January 23, 2023.

On January 13, 2025, it was announced that she would be expanding her role to a co-host of The Big Money Show on Fox Business alongside Taylor Riggs, Jackie DeAngelis and Brian Brenberg.
