= Imus in the Morning =

American radio program (1968–2018)

- Genre: Talk show; Comedy; Entertainment; Politics
- Running time: 3 hours, Monday thru Friday (6:00 am – 9:00 am)
- Country of origin: United States
- Language: English
- Home station: KUTY (1968–1969); KJOY (1969); KXOA (1969–1970); WGAR (1970–1971); WNBC/WFAN (1971–1977, 1979–2007); WHK (1978–1979; afternoons); WABC (2007–2018)
- Syndicates: Westwood One
- TV adaptations: MSNBC (1996–2007); RFD TV (2007–2009); Fox Business Network (2009–2015)
- Hosted by: Don Imus
- Starring: Charles McCord; Bernard McGuirk; Connell McShane; Mike Breen; Warner Wolf; Sid Rosenberg; Rob Bartlett; Lou Rufino; Tony Powell; Noam Laden; Mike Gunzelman
- Created by: Don Imus
- Executive producers: Don Imus; Bernard McGuirk
- Recording studio: KUTY Radio (1968–1969); KJOY Radio (1969); KXOA Radio (1969–1970); WGAR Radio (1970–1971); NBC Radio (1971–1977, 1979–1988); Kaufman Astoria Studios (1988–2005); Imus Ranch (1998–2014); MSNBC (2005–2007); WABC Radio (2007); Cablevision Rainbow Studios (2007–2009); Fox Business Network (2009–2015); Brenham, Texas (2015–2018)
- Original release: June 1, 1968 – March 29, 2018
- Opening theme: "Tom Sawyer" by Rush
- Website: www.imus.com

Imus in the Morning is a long-running radio show that was hosted by Don Imus, which ran in total from 1968 to 2018. The show originated on June 2, 1968, on various stations in the Western United States and Cleveland, Ohio, before settling on WNBC radio in New York City in 1971. In October 1988, the show moved to WFAN when that station took over WNBC's dial position following an ownership change. It was later syndicated to 60 other stations across the country by Westwood One, a division of CBS Radio, airing weekdays from 5:30 to 10 am Eastern time. Beginning September 3, 1996, the 6 to 9 am portion was simulcast on the cable television network MSNBC.

The show had been broadcast almost every weekday morning for 36 years on radio and 11 years on MSNBC until it was canceled on April 12, 2007, due to controversial comments made on the April 4, 2007, broadcast. Imus in the Morning program returned to the morning drive on New York radio station WABC on December 3, 2007. WABC is the flagship station of ABC Radio Networks (which itself was eventually subsumed into Westwood One in 2012), which syndicated the show nationally. From 2007 to August 2009, the show was simulcast on television nationwide on RFD-TV and rebroadcast each evening on RFD HD in high-definition. After Imus and RFD reached a mutual agreement to prematurely terminate the five-year deal, Fox Business Network began simulcasting the program on October 5, 2009, an arrangement which ended on May 29, 2015.

In March 2018, Cumulus Media, in the middle of a bankruptcy process, told Imus they were going to stop paying him, and as a result, Imus ended the show. The final broadcast of Imus in the Morning was March 29, 2018.

== History ==
Following a successful run as an on-air personality in Cleveland, Don Imus was hired by WNBC to host Imus in the Morning in late 1971. Imus is credited with introducing New York, and the larger Top 40 radio community, to the shock jock style of hosting. His initial run in New York ended in August 1977, when NBC management ordered a purge of WNBC's on-air staff in order to revive sagging ratings. Imus returned to Cleveland, but NBC brought him back to New York only two years later. On September 3, 1979, Imus started off his first program back on WNBC with his old character/voice/bit, "The Reverend Billy Sol Hargis". The show regularly parodied songs and voices, satirizing national and local events and persons.

After WNBC was sold to Emmis Communications in 1988, a frequency shift on New York's AM radio dial saw WFAN, Emmis's sports-talk station, move to WNBC's 660 AM dial position. WNBC signed off in October 1988, and WFAN decided to retain Imus, replacing its original morning drive-time show hosted by Greg Gumbel. Initially limited to the broadcast range of WFAN in the New York metropolitan area, the show's radio audience and influence expanded considerably once Westwood One began syndicating it in 1993.

During the WNBC years, Imus in the Morning was conducted out of NBC's radio studios at 30 Rockefeller Plaza. The program then moved to the Kaufman Astoria Studios in Astoria, Queens, WFAN's longtime studio home. In 2005, the program moved to a dedicated Imus in the Morning set at MSNBC's studios in Secaucus, New Jersey, although certain cast members remained at the WFAN studios using a split-screen format. When at the Imus Ranch, Don Imus would broadcast the show from Ribera, New Mexico, while the rest of the cast remained in New York and New Jersey.

For the first 15 months of Imus' simulcast on RFD, the show originated from a custom set created for RFD located in the Cablevision Rainbow studios in midtown Manhattan's Penn Plaza. In April 2009, the show moved to the multipurpose WABC radio studios; Imus cited the high cost of the Cablevision studios as being the reason for the move. In September 2009, the show moved to Fox Business Network's television studios in Rockefeller Center, where Fox Business began simulcasting the program on October 5, 2009. The Fox Business simulcast ended May 29, 2015. On June 15, 2015, the show started broadcasting solely on the radio from the WABC radio studios.

== Influence and demographics ==
Originally considered a shock jock, Imus turned his show more towards politics and news and gained public influence as a result. During the 1990s, Imus in the Morning became increasingly important as a useful, non-traditional platform for politicians to express their views and gain exposure. Former U.S. Sen. Al D'Amato (R-N.Y.) was one of the first officeholders to ingratiate himself with "The I-man", as Imus was frequently called by cast and guests. The show's many guests included prominent politicians such as Bill Clinton (during his 1992 presidential campaign), Barack Obama, Joe Biden, Mitt Romney, John McCain, John Kerry, Vice President Dick Cheney, J. D. Hayworth and Harold Ford Jr., as well as reporters and columnists from Newsweek, NBC, MSNBC, CNBC, CNN, Fox News and other media outlets. Among the cream of the press who regularly appeared on the show were Tom Brokaw, Tim Russert, Dan Rather, Brian Williams, Andrea Mitchell, Cokie Roberts, Sam Donaldson, Howard Fineman, Mike Barnicle, Frank Rich, Jonathan Alter and Jeff Greenfield.

In 1996 as MSNBC was being launched, the original plan for weekday morning programming was to rerun the previous night's prime-time shows. However, NBC Executive Producer of Special Events and Breaking News David Bohrman suggested to NBC president Andy Lack that putting the newsmaking Imus program on the new cable channel was the right thing to do. Bohrman contacted Imus, and over the course of several visits and business conversations a deal was struck so that the radio program would be simulcast on MSNBC. Cameras were installed in the WFAN radio studio, and remotely controlled from MSNBC headquarters in New Jersey. One of the unique features of the first few years of the program was that the television version's commercials and the radio commercials happened at different times, which allowed TV viewers a voyeuristic view of Imus and his team getting ready for the next segments. The program was a huge success on cable news for quite a while. Bohrman (who Imus referred to as "Moosebutt") produced the first few dozen programs, then hired Terry Irving to become the day-to-day Executive Producer of the television version of the program. In 1997, Imus was named as one of Time magazine's "25 most influential people in America"; he was also on the cover of Newsweek in 1999.

In 2005, Imus in the Morning was carried by about 90 radio stations across the United States, although at the time of its 2007 CBS Radio/MSNBC cancellation it was carried by 61 stations. Arbitron analysis put the program among the most listened to radio talk shows in the United States, with about 1.6 million radio listeners per week.

In an April 26, 2005, article, David Kiley wrote in Business Week magazine that Imus in the Morning commanded higher advertising rates compared to competing talk shows with larger audiences, because the Imus show was less politically partisan and its demographics were "affluent, educated and influential men". Kiley also quoted former CBS News anchor and Face the Nation moderator Bob Schieffer as saying, "I don't know anyone in Washington who doesn't listen to Imus or watch him on TV. I get more feedback off my spots on Imus than from my own shows." This included the former Howard Stern terrestrial radio broadcast. In comparison, Stern attracted more than 8.25 million listeners on half as many stations and Rush Limbaugh attracts 13.5 million listeners.

At the time of its 2007 MSNBC cancellation, Imus in the Morning averaged 361,000 viewers in the first quarter of 2007 and was up 39% over the previous year, ranking third among cable morning news programs in the Nielsen ratings, compared to 769,000 viewers of Fox & Friends on Fox News Channel and 372,000 viewers of CNN's American Morning. The program was reported to generate $20 million in annual revenue for WFAN, representing approximately 25 percent of the New York anchor station's revenue. Total revenue, including affiliate advertising and MSNBC, was said to be $50 million. MSNBC is said to have paid CBS $4 million annually in simulcast fees and to have averaged $500,000 per year in production expenses.

Imus generally selected country and western songs as bumper music, promoting artists such as Delbert McClinton, Lucinda Williams, Levon Helm, Little Sammy Davis, The Flatlanders as well as his de facto theme song from Kinky Friedman, "They Ain't Making Jews Like Jesus Anymore". Rock music, blues, oldies, and the occasional jazz piece is also used as bumper music. Imus is known for playing bumper music at a length that is unusual for talk radio.

== Cast members ==
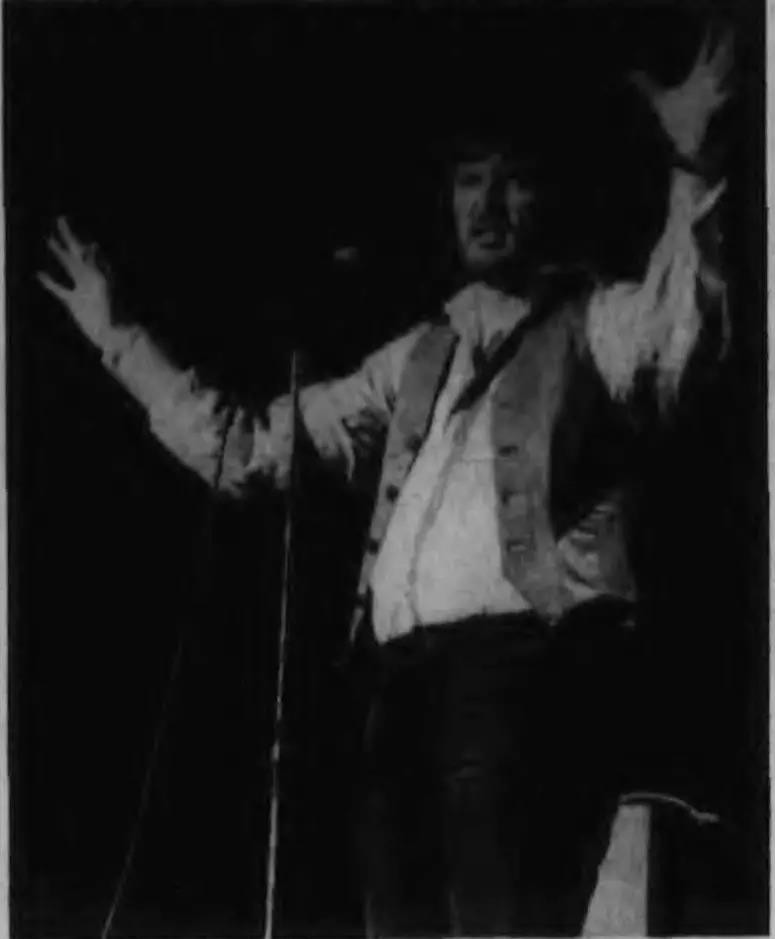
Host Don Imus in 1977.

Imus in the Morning had a regular cast of members who supplied news and comedy, and acted as foils to Imus. Part of the appeal of his show was the overt display of office politics: cast members were frequently the object of Imus' sarcasm, largely because of their outspoken points of view. The idea of including production staff as an on-air cast of characters was the idea of Fred Imus, Don's younger brother, who briefly served as the show's producer and was a regular guest on the show until his death in August 2011.

From the 1970s until his retirement on May 6, 2011, Charles McCord served as the program's newsman and head writer. In character, he usually acted as either the straight man or, occasionally, as an Imus sycophant or antagonist. McCord affected a neutral, reasoned tone and thus usually stayed out of Imus' line of fire, compared to the antics of the other cast members. He was responsible for developing the lines of questioning Imus would ask his guests, in addition to his anchor duties. Connell McShane took over the newsman position on May 9 and continued in the role until December 14, 2017.

Bernard McGuirk, his producer, was the show's antagonist, whom Imus had sometimes referred to as a "bald-headed stooge"; he also performed character voices (such as New Orleans Mayor Ray Nagin, former New York Catholic Archbishops Cardinals Edward Egan and John Joseph O'Connor, and poet Maya Angelou). McGuirk was the only other member of the cast to lose his job in the Rutgers controversy and was initially uncharacteristically quiet for the first few weeks of the revival before returning, saying only "Hi" during the first show back on December 3, 2007, on WABC-AM.

At the time of the show's ending, Sid Rosenberg was the program's sports reporter. He engaged in disputes with his fellow cast members, including a boxing bout with McGuirk. He also co-hosted Middays on WFAN with Jody McDonald and Joe Beningo. Rosenberg resigned from WFAN in 2005 and was fired on May 25 in that year from the Imus show for comments about Kylie Minogue's breast cancer diagnosis. He worked at various sports stations in South Florida for 10 years, and remained a substitute and guest contributor on the Imus program, before returning to his post on the program when Warner Wolf, who had two prolonged runs as the program's sportscaster, was ousted in November 2016. Other sports reporters included Chris Carlin (best known for "the fat boy lock of the week!,") Patrick McEnroe (who auditioned to replace Imus on WFAN), Don Criqui, Mike Breen (valued for his deadpan delivery of false sports news, and ridiculed after his head injuries during the 2008 NBA Finals), and Christopher "Mad Dog" Russo. For years, Larry "Ratso" Sloman contributed humorous New York Rangers reports but after he collaborated with Howard Stern on "Private Parts" he was persona non grata on the show and became a whipping boy for Imus especially when Imus' guest was Kinky Friedman, who is a close friend of Ratso.

Rob Bartlett impersonated a cast of celebrities (Bill Clinton, The Godfather, Dr. Phil, Brian Wilson, Hulk Hogan, Rush Limbaugh, Scott Muni, Omar Minaya, Alberto Gonzales, Vicente Fox, Al Gore, Blind Mississippi White Boy Pig Feets Dupris, Liza Minnelli, Yoko Ono, Carl Paladino, Mick Jagger and many others).

Tony Powell, an African-American comedian, originally gave sports reports before shifting into a general contributor and celebrity impersonator, usually impersonating black celebrities such as Little Richard, Jesse Jackson, Eddie Murphy, and Charles Rangel. He was one of two African-Americans added to the staff when the show returned on WABC and RFD; Texas native Karith Foster was the other, though Foster left when her contract was not renewed in 2009, just prior to the move to Fox Business Network. Powell filled a role previously held by Larry Kenney, an impersonator who (along with Bartlett) served as a celebrity impersonator (some of the voices Kenney impersonated Richard Nixon, George Patton, Ted Kennedy, Andy Rooney, Jack Nicholson, and Jerry Falwell), but was bumped from the program when it returned on WABC and RFD in favor of Foster and Powell.

Lou Rufino served as the program engineer; he had a considerable on-air role, but did not appear on-air as often as the other cast members.

Other previous reporters included Janice Dean, Christy Musumeci, and Tracy Burgess, who departed for Fox News Channel, MSNBC, and WFAN respectively. Karith Foster, a Texas-raised black woman hired in the wake of the Rutgers controversy, was a comedian and general contributor, but left the show in August 2009 after her contract was not renewed. Alexis Glick briefly served as a business reporter for the show shortly after it debuted on Fox Business, but left the show and the network after two months; Diane Macedo and Dagen McDowell filled the positions for the remainder of the show's run on Fox Business.

Imus had regular guests on the program to discuss upcoming sporting events. Typically, these guests appeared only during the season of their respective sport. Such guests include Jim Nantz and Phil Simms (of CBS) and Terry Bradshaw (of Fox) for football, and Darrell Waltrip (of Fox) for NASCAR. During an interview with Boomer Esiason, after ridiculing him, Imus chided Esiason with a trademark phrase "get off my phone," insisting he hang up. Esiason shot back with "no, you get off my phone." Other frequent guests included Bo Dietl, a private investigator; and Imus's wife.

== Controversies ==
Imus offended President Bill Clinton with remarks in front of the Clintons during a 1996 Radio and Television Correspondents Association dinner speech.

On October 19, 1998, Newsday reported that Imus called Washington Post media writer Howard Kurtz "that boner-nosed ... beanie-wearing little Jew boy".

Imus has had a long-standing rivalry with Howard Stern, dating back to their days at WNBC. It boiled to the surface in 2003, when Stern called Imus while both were on the air to demand an apology for a comedy skit that Imus had aired. After exchanging insults, Imus cut Stern off. In late 2005, Imus commented that he wished Stern would do well at Sirius satellite radio, as Imus held Sirius stock. In a CBS News interview he conducted before his retirement, Imus stated that he considered Stern one of the best radio performers in history, along with himself, Arthur Godfrey, Jack Benny and Wolfman Jack.

When the program was simulcast on MSNBC, Imus frequently ridiculed NBC/MSNBC personalities, staff, programs, and policies. During election coverage in 2004, NBC set up an outdoor interactive visitors attraction, Democracy Plaza at Rockefeller Center. Imus referred to it as "Hypocrisy Plaza."

On the December 15, 2004, Imus in the Morning show, Don Imus referred to the publishers Simon & Schuster as "thieving Jews" and later in the same show gave a mock apology, calling the phrase "thieving Jews", "redundant".

Beginning in February 2005, MSNBC featured Amy Robach, and then-afternoon regular Contessa Brewer as newsreaders on Imus in the Morning. Brewer held the position for over two months and was the target of Imus's constant ridicule, which was initially dismissed as typical show fodder. On April 29, 2005, the New York Post published a statement attributed to Brewer calling Imus a "cantankerous old fool." He responded on-air by calling her "fat" and "painfully stupid," and hurled countless personal insults. Brewer left Imus in the Morning immediately.

On November 30, 2006, on Imus in the Morning, Imus referred to the Jewish management at CBS as "money-grubbing bastards".

Sid Rosenberg, who provided sports updates on the Imus show, got into trouble when he suggested on air that tennis stars Serena and Venus Williams were animals better suited to pose for National Geographic than Playboy. Rosenberg also stated that Palestinians mourning the death of Yasser Arafat were "stinking animals" upon whom the Israelis "ought to drop the bomb right there, kill 'em all right now..." He was fired from the Don Imus show after making crude remarks about Australian singer Kylie Minogue's breast cancer diagnosis. Chris Carlin replaced Rosenberg, although Rosenberg continued to call into the Imus program up until its cancellation on WFAN/MSNBC. He has appeared on the WABC/RFD incarnation on different occasions, notably providing reports from Super Bowl XLIII.

== Cancellation ==
=== Rutgers women's basketball remarks ===
On the Imus in the Morning broadcast of April 4, 2007, substitute sportscaster Sid Rosenberg of WAXY reported on the NCAA Division I women's basketball championship game from the previous evening between the University of Tennessee and Rutgers University. As MSNBC rolled tape of the game footage, Imus said in a voiceover, "They're some rough girls from Rutgers. They got tattoos." Bernard McGuirk then interjected, "yeah, hardcore hos." Imus then added, "That's some nappy-headed hos right there." McGuirk then compared the game to "the jigaboos versus the wannabes," in apparent allusion to the Spike Lee film School Daze.

The following day, Bryan Monroe, the president of the National Association of Black Journalists, described Imus's comments as "beyond offensive" and called for his immediate firing. MSNBC responded later that day with a statement disassociating itself from Imus's remarks. On the April 6 Imus in the Morning show, Imus expressed regret over his remarks, contending that it was said in jest by "a good man who did a bad thing".

On Saturday, April 7, the Rev. Al Sharpton, described by The New York Times as "among the leaders of the movement to force Don Imus off the air", told an angry audience in Harlem, New York, that Imus should be "taken off the airwaves" for the racially disparaging remark.

Protest demonstrations by "Rainbow/PUSH" in Chicago, Illinois, in front of NBC's owned-and-operated Chicago station were led by Rev. Jesse Jackson on April 9 as 50 demonstrators held signs reading "No apologies, no forgiveness" and chanting "Imus must go".

Also on April 9, presidential candidate Barack Obama termed Imus's comments, "Divisive, hurtful, and offensive to Americans of all backgrounds", saying "With a public platform comes a trust. As far as I'm concerned, he violated that trust."

Clarence Page, who had occasionally been a guest on Imus in the Morning, wrote that Imus broke a promise made to him six years previously to eschew racially offensive remarks.

Amidst the gathering protests, Imus delivered a second, lengthier apology at the beginning of the Imus in the Morning program on Monday, April 9 and offered to meet with the Rutgers team to apologize personally. Imus again stated that he "is a good person who made a very bad mistake", citing his charitable works. Later that day, CBS Radio and NBC (which owns MSNBC through its NBC News division) announced a two-week suspension of Don Imus' program on radio and television starting Monday, April 16. The initial delay in the start of the suspension was to allow the WFAN Radiothon, which was to begin on April 12, to still be broadcast on MSNBC. NBC News President Steve Capus released a prepared statement explaining the network's action:

"Beginning Monday, April 16, MSNBC will suspend simulcasting the syndicated Imus in the Morning radio program for two weeks. This comes after careful consideration in the days since his racist, abhorrent comments were made. Don Imus has expressed profound regret and embarrassment and has made a commitment to listen to all of those who have raised legitimate expressions of outrage. In addition, his dedication – in his words – to change the discourse on his program moving forward, has confirmed for us that this action is appropriate. Our future relationship with Imus is contingent on his ability to live up to his word."

=== MSNBC cancellation ===
MSNBC Imus in the Morning logo

On Wednesday, April 11, 2007, NBC News announced that MSNBC would no longer simulcast Imus in the Morning, effective immediately.

This decision comes as a result of an ongoing review process, which initially included the announcement of a suspension. It also takes into account many conversations with our own employees. What matters to us most is that the men and women of NBC Universal have confidence in the values we have set for this company. This is the only decision that makes that possible. Once again, we apologize to the women of the Rutgers basketball team and to our viewers. We deeply regret the pain this incident has caused.

— Steve Capus, NBC News President, "MSNBC drops simulcast of Don Imus show". Today.com. April 11, 2007.

Several advertisers of Imus in the Morning announced their withdrawal from sponsorship, including General Motors (Imus' biggest advertiser) Staples Inc., Sprint Nextel, American Express, and Procter & Gamble.

Capus also revealed that in staff meetings, NBC's African-American news staff and on-air personalities opposed Imus' return to MSNBC, with Al Roker of the Today show expressing particularly strong opposition both internally and on the Today show's website. Capus denied, however, that the loss of ad revenue was a determining factor in his network's decision to drop Imus. He was quoted by The New York Times as saying that "The reputation of the news division means more to me than advertising dollars. Because if you lose your reputation, you lose everything." The absence and silence from Imus' frequent NBC guests Brian Williams, Andrea Mitchell, David Gregory, Chris Matthews and close 'friend' Tim Russert was obvious and an indication of NBC's future action.

MSNBC's timing of Imus' cancellation was criticized on WFAN, as Imus in the Morning had been scheduled to kick off the 18th Annual WFAN Radiothon, a large annual fundraising event, the next morning. The Radiothon aired April 12 on radio only.

Asked for his reaction, Sharpton told The New York Times that "we have been halfway successful so far" and that he was planning to organize a demonstration in front of CBS's Manhattan corporate headquarters. He said, "This has never been about Don Imus. I have no idea whether he is a good man or not. This is about the use of public airwaves for bigoted, racist speech."

=== CBS Radio cancellation ===
On Thursday morning, April 12, 2007, Jesse Jackson and Al Sharpton met with CBS President and CEO Les Moonves to demand that Imus be fired. That afternoon, Moonves issued a statement announcing that CBS Radio had cancelled Imus in the Morning, effective immediately:.

From the outset, I believe all of us have been deeply upset and revulsed by the statements that were made on our air about the young women who represented Rutgers University in the NCAA Women's Basketball Championship with such class, energy and talent.

— Leslie Moonves, CBS President and CEO, "CBS Corp says cancels Don Imus radio show". Reuters. April 12, 2007.

Following the announcement, Jackson called the removal "a victory for public decency. No one should use the public airwaves to transmit racial or sexual degradation."

Sharpton said of Imus, "He says he wants to be forgiven. I hope he continues in that process. But we cannot afford a precedent established that the airways can commercialize and mainstream sexism and racism."

The final day of the WFAN Radiothon, April 13, was co-hosted by Deirdre Imus and Charles McCord during the hours when Imus in the Morning formerly aired.

=== Reaction to the cancellation ===
Don and Deirdre Imus met with the Rutgers team on the evening of April 12 at the New Jersey Governor's Mansion, according to a report broadcast by CNN, which characterized the meeting as "emotional". C. Vivian Stringer, coach of the Rutgers team, said the next day that she and her team "still find his statements to be unacceptable," but that they accepted Imus's apology.

Civil rights and women's groups such as the National Organization for Women praised CBS and MSNBC for their action, saying that there is no place on the public airwaves for racial and anti-female slurs. Newsweek magazine in its April 23, 2007, cover story said that for too long its own reporters coveted an invitation to appear on Imus in the Morning:

Suddenly some of America's largest media companies and most important corporate advertisers were confronted with the fact that they had been complicit in the rise and reign of a purveyor of ugly stereotypes. Mainstream figures and institutions that had chosen to compartmentalize the Imus kingdom "enjoying the salon while overlooking the slurs" realized they could no longer have it both ways

"The Power That Was", Newsweek

Others, however, criticized the cancellation of Imus in the Morning as a "double standard", arguing that Imus was merely echoing the truth common to rap music lyrics heard on recordings, MTV, and BET. This idea itself, however, has been countered, as some think it laughable that "pundits and politicians have apparently decided on a consensus culprit to cleanse the national soul: hip-hop".

In reaction to the Imus show and its cancellation, there were calls for an end to offensive language in the rap music genre. "Bo" Dietl, a regular guest on Imus in the Morning denounced Moonves on Fox News Channel for CBS' cancellation of Imus while producing rap music with anti-female lyrics, saying, "Mr. Les Moonves, you care about the quality, why don't you care about your CBS records with all the garbage my 17-year-old daughter listens to and they use this word 'ho' back and forth and they degrade women all the time. If I thought that Don Imus was a racist in any part, shape or form, I wouldn't be here today."

=== Settlement ===
Before his show was canceled, Imus and CBS had signed a contract extension for about $10 million per year. Before Imus could explore another broadcasting job it was necessary for Imus and CBS to reach a settlement on the contract.

On May 4, 2007, Martin Garbus, a lawyer for Imus, claimed that the broadcasters of the program could have edited Imus's comments, given that the program was subject to tape delay. The lawyer also indicated that Imus would sue CBS Radio for $120 million in unpaid salary and damages. CBS Radio replied that it would vigorously defend against the suit.

During a June 29, 2007, broadcast, comments were made by WFAN host Mike Francesa and McCord which seemed to indicate that Imus would be returning to the air in the near future, possibly rejoining WFAN. The comments were made during a 20th anniversary celebration of WFAN, as part of a broadcast meant to honor Imus's contribution to the station. McCord noted that the broadcast seemed to reflect on Imus through a rear-view mirror. Then he quipped, "Be warned: Objects in the mirror may be closer than they appear." Francesa then cryptically added that by, "this September, I hope the team will once again be complete". Technically, both comments were accurate: McCord's "warning" could be seen as a prediction that he and Imus would reunite, which would indeed happen on a rival station, and Francesa's comment was true on the basis that Boomer Esiason and Craig Carton took over the morning position permanently in September 2007.

On August 14, 2007, it became clear that Imus would not return to WFAN when it was announced that Imus and CBS agreed to a settlement.

== Broadcast return ==
Although speculated since his dismissal, the return to morning radio for Imus was officially announced by New York talk-radio station WABC on November 1, 2007. The show's first broadcast aired on December 3. The financial package between Imus and WABC is a 5-year deal worth up to $40 million.

Newsman Charles McCord, producer Bernard McGuirk, and engineer Lou Rufino were part of the revived show, along with most of television production crew that worked the MSNBC broadcast; the first guests were historian Doris Kearns Goodwin, Senator John McCain, Senator Christopher Dodd, Democratic Party strategist James Carville, and Imus regular Bo Dietl.

A significant rollout of Imus in the Morning took place in March 2008 following mass layoffs at Citadel Broadcasting. Imus was packaged with The True Oldies Channel to replace select underperforming Citadel stations. In August, Imus claimed his show was heard on more stations than it was at the time of his 2007 firing.

As of late 2009 the show was one of the ten most listened to morning shows in New York City. Imus signed three-year extensions with Cumulus Media Networks (the company that bought Citadel in late 2011) and television partner Fox Business Network (see below) in December 2012. The arrangement with Cumulus was again renewed in 2016.

=== Television simulcast ===
==== RFD-TV ====
Imus was originally in talks with "big-market" TV suitors Fox Business Network, Fox News Channel, and others to simulcast the show on national television. On November 13, it was announced that a 5-year deal was reached to simulcast Imus in the Morning on RFD-TV, which is available on both DISH Network and DirecTV but only (as of November 2007) on a limited number of cable providers. The number of systems carrying RFD was anticipated to increase because of the Imus deal. The show was broadcast from 6-9am eastern time on RFD-TV and from 6-9pm in high-definition on RFD HD. In addition, the RFD press release announcing the deal stated:

"[RFD] is developing plans to offer the Imus video programming through new technologies including VOD, streaming, and podcasts, as well as, seek worldwide distribution of the RFD-TV production to obtain the highest possible audience."

However, during the program's tenure on RFD, none of the above "new technologies" (VOD, streaming, nor a podcast) ever materialized. (These would eventually arrive in 2011, long after Imus left the network.)

==== Fox Business ====
The final show on RFD TV aired August 28, 2009. Although the contract between Imus and RFD was originally for five years, both parties decided to mutually end the simulcast prematurely, amid reports of the program's inevitable move to Fox Business. Shortly thereafter, Imus inked a new television deal with Fox Business Network (FBN), a channel that was already a significant sponsor of the show.

The show debuted on FBN on October 5, 2009. The Imus in the Morning program physically moved from ABC Radio studios to Fox Business studios as part of the deal, and simulcasted live on FBN from 6am to 9am ET. On January 18, 2010, Imus in the Morning was extended by 20 minutes on Fox Business Network, from 6am to 9:20am ET, after the abrupt cancellation of The Opening Bell on Fox Business. Thus, virtually the entire show was simulcast on television, until February 24, 2014, when Imus in the Morning was truncated by 20 minutes. Therefore, the show reverted to the original 3-hour format, from 6am to 9am ET, due to the debut of Opening Bell with Maria Bartiromo on that same day.

Imus ended the television simulcast on May 29, 2015, when he relocated to Texas full-time; continuing the simulcast would have required the show to remain based in New York. Everyone from the radio side remained, as well as Connell McShane (who continued to work for both Imus and Fox Business simultaneously until a change in management forced McShane to focus on his Fox Business work full-time beginning at the end of 2017); the remainder of the television cast members did not follow Imus to the radio side.

== End ==
Imus was off the air frequently during 2017 because of health problems, some of which stemmed from a 2014 rib injury that made it difficult for him to breathe; he also suffered from emphysema for an unknown length of time. The health problems also forced Imus to shorten his program from four hours to three and eventually led to his 2019 death.

On January 22, 2018, Imus announced that he would be retiring and that the show would not continue under his name without him; he stated his last show would be March 29, 2018. The decision was not entirely of Imus's choosing; as he stated on-air, Cumulus Media, having declared chapter 11 bankruptcy, intended to void his contract in the process of emerging from it. Even if Cumulus had not gone bankrupt, Imus was planning on retiring at the end of his contract in December. In his closing remarks, Imus tearfully expressed remorse for his 2007 statements, thanked a select few members of the family and close radio associates, and stated that, while he would not miss the grind of a daily radio show, he would miss the listeners, thanking them for listening and for their contributions to the numerous charitable causes Imus promoted throughout his career.

McGuirk and Rosenberg continued in the time slot as co-hosts of The Bernie & Sid Show (later renamed Bernie and Sid in the Morning) for the next few years. McGuirk died on October 5, 2022, after battling prostate and brain cancer, and the program was renamed Sid & Friends in the Morning, with a guest co-host format replacing Rosenberg.

Preceded by Greg Gumbel	WFAN morning show 1988-2007	Succeeded by Boomer and Carton in the Morning
Preceded by MSNBC Live	MSNBC morning show 1996-2007	Succeeded by Morning Joe
Preceded by Curtis Sliwa and Ron Kuby	WABC morning show 2007-2018	Succeeded by Bernard McGuirk and Sid Rosenberg
Preceded by Money for Breakfast	Fox Business Network morning show 2009-2015	Succeeded by Mornings With Maria
