= Ribera, New Mexico =

Unincorporated community in New Mexico, United States

- CDP
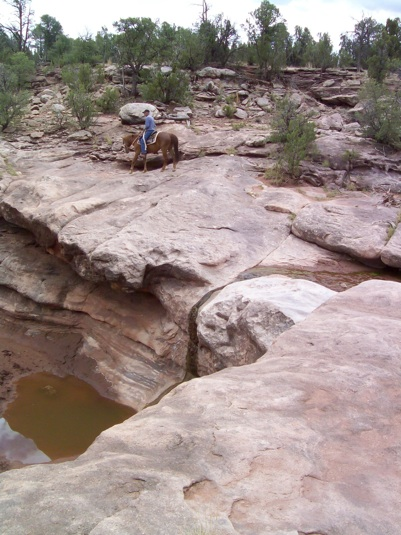
- Horse rider above a pothole in a stream bed southwest of Ribera

- Location in New Mexico and in the United States Ribera, New Mexico (the United States)
- Coordinates: 35°22′25″N 105°26′35″W
- Country: United States
- State: New Mexico
- County: San Miguel

Area
  - Total: 2.52 sq mi (6.52 km^{2})
  - Land: 2.52 sq mi (6.52 km^{2})
  - Water: 0 sq mi (0.00 km^{2})
- Elevation: 6,014 ft (1,833 m)

Population (2020)
  - Total: 314
  - Density: 124.8/sq mi (48.17/km^{2})
- Time zone: UTC-7 (Mountain (MST))
  - Summer (DST): UTC-6 (MDT)
- FIPS code: 35-62760
- GNIS feature ID: 2584192

Ribera is an unincorporated community and census-designated place in San Miguel County, New Mexico. Located in the northern part of the state, it is at the foot of Rowe Mesa and along the Pecos River, 50 miles (80 km) southeast of Santa Fe.

As of the 2020 census, Ribera had a population of 314.

== Geography ==
The town is divided by Interstate 25 and Route 3, which was along the original Route 66, and a great deal of evidence from the famous motor-tourist route still remains in the form of old rusted cars and long abandoned structures. The area is home to many artists and ranchers. The town has a now closed gas station and general store called Sunshine Station.

East of Ribera is the site of the Imus Ranch, a non-profit organization that from 1999 to 2014 helped children of all ages afflicted with cancer. The Fox Business program Imus in the Morning regularly broadcast from the Imus Ranch.

South of Ribera is San Miguel del Vado, an even smaller unincorporated community and a former stop on the Santa Fe Trail. West of Ribera is the Glorieta Mesa portion of the Santa Fe National Forest.

== Demographics ==
Historical population
Census	Pop.	Note	%±
2020	314		—
U.S. Decennial Census

== Education ==
It is in the West Las Vegas Schools school district. West Las Vegas High School is the area high school.

== Notable people ==
- Richard Vigil, former member of the New Mexico House of Representatives

== Related links ==
- Ribera :: New Mexico Tourism Department
- El Ancon Sculpture Park at the International Sculpture Center
