= Don Imus =

American media personality (1940–2019)

- Imus in 1976
- Born: John Donald Imus Jr. July 23, 1940; Riverside, California, U.S.
- Died: December 27, 2019 (aged 79); College Station, Texas, U.S.
- Occupations: Radio and television talk-show host, writer, humorist
- Years active: 1964–2018
- Spouses: Harriet Showalter (m. 1969; div. 1979) Deirdre Coleman (m. 1994)
- Children: 6
- Awards: NAB Broadcasting Hall of Fame, 4 NAB Marconi Radio Awards

John Donald Imus Jr. (/ˈaɪməs/ EYE-məs; July 23, 1940 – December 27, 2019), also known as Imus, was an American radio personality, television show host, recording artist, and author. His radio show Imus in the Morning was aired on various stations and digital platforms nationwide until 2018.

Imus began his first radio job at KUTY in Palmdale, California in 1968. Three years later, he landed the morning broadcast position at WNBC in New York City. He was fired from WNBC in 1977, worked for a year at WHK in Cleveland, and was rehired by WNBC in 1979. He remained at WNBC until it left the air in 1988, at which time his show moved to WFAN, which took over WNBC's former frequency of 660 kHz. Howard Stern's success with national syndication led Imus in the Morning to adopt the same model in 1993.

Imus was labeled a "shock jock" in his later career. He was fired by CBS Radio in April 2007 after describing the Rutgers University women's basketball team as "nappy-headed hos".

In January 2018, Cumulus Media told Imus that the company was going to stop paying him, and his final show aired on March 29, 2018. He died the following year of complications from lung disease.

== Early life ==
Imus was born in Riverside, California, to a wealthy family, the son of John Donald Imus Sr. and Frances E. Imus (née Moore) who ran a 35,000-acre (140 km^{2}) ranch named The Willows near Kingman, Arizona. Imus claimed at one time to practice Judaism then later recanted, calling himself, "spiritual." He had a younger brother, Fred Imus (1942–2011). Imus disliked school, moving "from one hideous private school to another" and described himself as a "horrible adolescent". When he was 15, his parents divorced. His father died when Imus was 20.

In 1957, while living in Prescott, Arizona, Imus dropped out of high school and joined the United States Marine Corps. He was stationed at Camp Pendleton where he was in an artillery unit before transferring to the Drum and Bugle Corps. He left the Marines with an honorable discharge, and secured work as a window dresser in San Bernardino, before he was fired for performing strip teases on the mannequins for passersby. Imus then moved to Hollywood with his brother in an attempt to find success as musicians and songwriters, but they struggled to get radio DJs to play their songs on the air. This left Imus homeless, resorting to sleeping in a laundry and hitchhiking back to Arizona. After dropping out of the University of the Pacific, Imus worked as a brakeman on the Southern Pacific Railroad and in a uranium mine in Arizona. He suffered a mining accident that broke both of his legs.

== Career ==
=== Early career ===
In 1966, Imus enrolled at the Don Martin School of Radio and Television Arts and Sciences, in Hollywood, after seeing a newspaper advertisement; he was thrown out for being "uncooperative", but studied enough to obtain a broadcasting license from the Federal Communications Commission (FCC). Upon winning a talent contest at Johnny Otis's night club, he worked as a singer-songwriter, with Otis serving as his manager. After hearing a morning radio DJ at KUTY, in Palmdale, California, Imus went to the station and successfully persuaded the owner to hire him. He signed on the air on June 2, 1968. While at KUTY, Imus debuted his on-air character Billy Sol Hargis, a radio evangelist inspired by and named for preacher Billy James Hargis and businessman Billie Sol Estes. Imus was an instant success at the station; in two months, he had become number one in ratings for his time slot, and earned a Billboard Award for Air Personality of the Year in a medium-sized market.

Imus then had a brief tenure at KJOY in Stockton, California, from which he was fired due to an incident that some sources attributed to his Eldridge Cleaver look-alike contest in which the winner would be incarcerated for a year. Other sources suggest the firing was because of his saying "hell" and multiple raunchy jokes on-air. Imus moved to KXOA in Sacramento, California, whose management team—including general manager Jack G. Thayer and program director John Lund—both left for identical positions at Cleveland station WGAR and took Imus with them. Thayer and Lund were hired by WGAR to revamp the station's old-line middle of the road (MOR) format, and had Imus as the centerpiece for their new adult contemporary format that had been developed at KXOA. Imus's tenure at WGAR lasted for less than 15 months but immediately showed success. The October/November 1970 Arbitron ratings listed Imus at number one in the 18–49 demographic, ahead of WKYC's Jim Runyon and WJW's Ed Fisher; WGAR as a whole topped both the 25–34 and 25–49 demographics. Imus was honored by Billboard as the number one radio personality for 1971, an honor he shared with KMPC's Gary Owens.

Imus in the Morning was controversial and satirical, with Imus's existing characters and comedy skits garnering immediate attention. One of his earliest on-air jokes involved promoting the 1958 Bobby Darin single "Queen of the Hop" as "a WGAR exclusive" and talking over it in the mode of a Top 40 DJ. Imus also became infamous for his series of prank calls, even dialing Ohio Attorney General William J. Brown's publicly listed phone number and inviting him to "join the swinging world of show biz". He once contacted an Ohio Bell phone operator to ask if she was married and if "you mess around", prompting the phone company's lawyers to contact the station. His most infamous prank call was to a McDonald's restaurant claiming to be an Ohio National Guard official and ordered 4,000 hamburgers as lunch for the troops. While the phone call was entirely scripted by Imus and Lund (with Lund voicing the McDonald's worker) the segment influenced a later FCC ruling that required all radio DJs to identify themselves when they make phone calls on the air. Imus also devoted one show to help a Yugoslavian immigrant find a bride in order to prevent his deportation after it was discovered he had entered the United States illegally. Meanwhile, Imus, Jack Thayer, and WGAR were hit with a defamation lawsuit by television meteorologist Robert Zames after Imus repeatedly questioned Zames's sobriety and joked about it on-air.

=== 1971–1979: WNBC and WHK ===
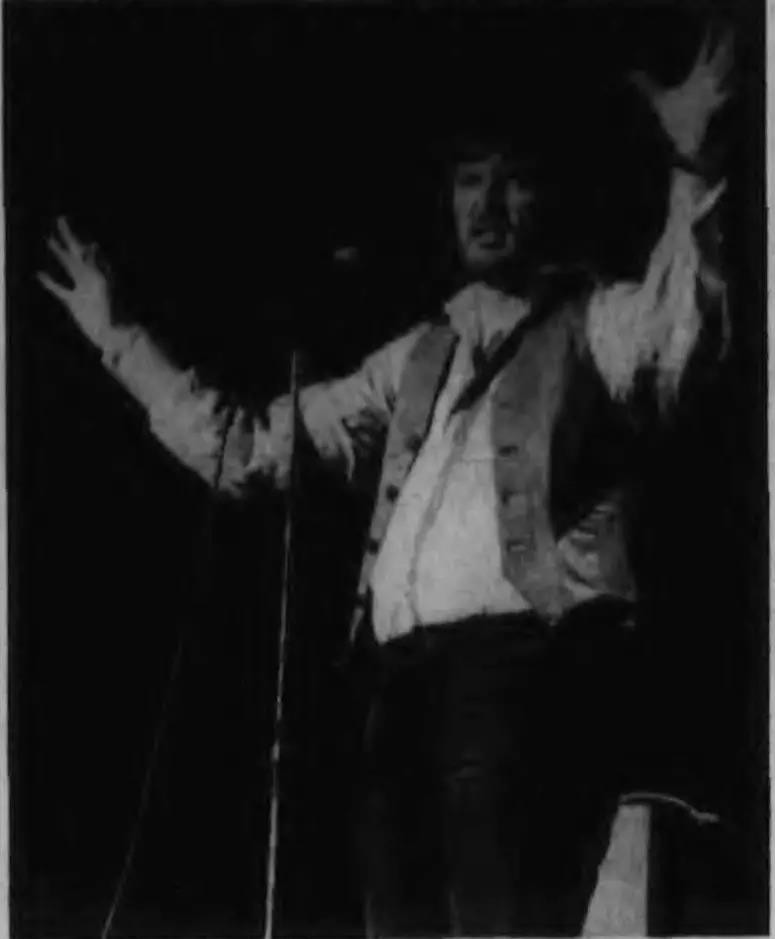
Imus in a 1977 newspaper at the Monmouth Arts Center

On December 2, 1971, less than three years into his radio career, Imus started his morning show at WNBC in New York City, with a $100,000 annual salary which was said to have been double his WGAR salary. On his second day, he overslept and missed the show. Imus was involved in various projects during his time at WNBC. In March 1973, he began a stand-up comedy and stage act called Imus in the Evening; his first shows were held at The Bitter End in New York City. On January 30, 1974 he appeared as himself (a patient at Hope Memorial with a broken leg from skiing while on vacation from his radio show) on the NBC-TV daytime soap opera The Doctors. By the early 1980s, he was earning as much as $10,000 a performance. Imus retired his stand-up in December 1985. He released an album containing radio segments and songs: 1200 Hamburgers to Go (1972).

Imus started to drink heavily during this period, which soon affected his working life. He started to miss work and became increasingly unmanageable. He missed 100 days of work in 1973. In August 1977, WNBC decided to reformat the station and let go of their on-air staff. Imus described himself as "awful" and "a jerk" during this time, and struggled to find a suitable job in New York City that satisfied his salary demands. He returned to Cleveland and began an afternoon drive show on WHK in 1978. He found the experience humiliating but took the job in order to earn money and "get my act together".

=== 1979–1988: WNBC ===
On September 3, 1979, Imus returned to the air in mornings at WNBC from 5:30 am. By this time, Imus had started to use cocaine; he quit in 1983. He continued to drink, and his on- and off-air behavior became erratic; he turned up for work without shoes and slept on park benches with large amounts of money in his pocket. By 1981, Imus and Charles McCord secured a deal with Paramount Pictures that involved the development of three screenplays, including work on Joy of Sex. In April 1981, Imus renewed his contract with WNBC with a five-year deal worth $500,000 a year with bonuses if he surpassed ratings targets. Following the addition of Howard Stern in afternoons in 1982, Imus and Stern began a longtime feud though both were paired on WNBC print and television advertisements.

In July 1981, Imus released his first book, God's Other Son, a novel about the life of his on-air character Billy Sol Hargis that he wrote with McCord. It was republished in 1994 and spent seven weeks on The New York Times best seller list. By October 1981, Imus was the most popular radio DJ in the US, reaching 220,000 regular listeners and number one in 12 of 13 demographic categories.

Imus was also the utility announcer for Geraldo Rivera's monthly TV series Good Night America, which aired as a recurring segment of ABC's Wide World of Entertainment program (1973–1976), and he was one of the inaugural video jockeys (VJ) for the launch of VH-1, sister cable channel to MTV, in 1985.

=== 1988–2007: WFAN and national syndication ===
In 1989, Imus signed a five-year deal to continue his show on WFAN. In April 1989, Imus was inducted into the National Radio Hall of Fame. Later in 1989, Imus accepted an invitation to become an honorary assistant coach for a basketball game between the Fordham Rams and La Salle Explorers the following January.

The show began syndication in June 1993 when it was simulcast on WEEI in Boston, followed by four other stations around the country.

Imus was instrumental in raising over $60 million for the Center for the Intrepid, a Texas rehabilitation facility for soldiers wounded in the Iraq War.

=== 2007–2018: WABC and retirement ===
The program was heard on WABC starting on December 3, 2007. In 2018, Cumulus Media informed Imus that the company was going to stop paying him because of the bankruptcy reorganization that Cumulus was undergoing. The show aired its final episode on March 29, 2018.

== Controversies ==
=== Rutgers women's basketball team ===
On April 4, 2007, during an on-air discussion about the NCAA women's basketball championship between the Rutgers Scarlet Knights and Tennessee Lady Volunteers, Imus characterized the largely black Rutgers team as "rough girls" in a comment on the players' tattoos. His executive producer Bernard McGuirk responded by referring to them as "hardcore hos". The discussion continued with Imus describing the women as "nappy-headed hos" and McGuirk remarking that the two teams looked like the "jigaboos versus the wannabes" as mentioned in Spike Lee's film School Daze, apparently referring to the two teams' differing appearances.

In the immediate aftermath of the remarks, public outrage was directed at Imus and WFAN. Howard Stern discussed how he had heard Imus make racist comments that were directed at a black female co-worker while the two were working at WNBC. Management was aware of the comments at the time but had done nothing. Stern's co-host Robin Quivers confirmed that assertion and added that she had once been the target of Imus's racist remarks herself. Imus dismissed the controversy at first, calling the incident "some idiot comment meant to be amusing". He also stated that "nappy-headed hos" is a term that rap artists use to refer to black women. He said:

That phrase didn't originate in the white community. That phrase originated in the black community. Young black women all through that society are demeaned and disparaged and disrespected by their own black men, and they are called that name in black hip hop.

In response to mounting public censure, Imus issued a statement of apology:

I want to take a moment to apologize for an insensitive and ill-conceived remark we made the other morning regarding the Rutgers women's basketball team, which lost to Tennessee in the NCAA championship game on Tuesday. It was completely inappropriate and we can understand why people were offended. Our characterization was thoughtless and stupid, and we are sorry.

On April 9, Imus appeared on Al Sharpton's syndicated radio talk show Keepin' It Real with Al Sharpton to address the controversy. Sharpton called the comments "abominable", "racist", and "sexist", and repeated his earlier demand that Imus be fired. Imus said, "Our agenda is to be funny and sometimes we go too far. And this time we went way too far. Here's what I've learned: that you can't make fun of everybody, because some people don't deserve it."

Imus was suspended soon after. Media commentators were divided on the suspension. On MSNBC's Scarborough Country on April 10, Pat Buchanan said Imus was "a good guy" who "made a bad mistake and apologized for it" and that the show should stay on the air. Comedian Bill Maher said that, if a comedian apologizes for stepping over a line, that should suffice. MSNBC media analyst Steve Adubato disagreed, saying that this incident was "not isolated". Joe Klein made the same charge, referring to Imus's comment about The New York Times reporter Gwen Ifill 14 years earlier being a "cleaning lady" as evidence of a pattern of offensive comments. On The View, Rosie O'Donnell spoke out in support of keeping Imus on the air on free speech grounds. Emil Steiner of The Washington Post argued that Sharpton used the issue to further divide the United States along racial lines.

The Rutgers basketball team held a news conference at which coach C. Vivian Stringer stated that the team would meet with Imus to discuss his comments. Several of the players expressed their outrage over his remarks. Team captain Essence Carson said that Imus's remarks had "stolen a moment of pure grace from us".

Chicago Tribune columnist Clarence Page had confronted Imus about his characterization of certain black athletes and got him to take a pledge to stop. After the Rutgers team incident, Page said that he would not appear on the show again and said of the original two-week suspension:

I know other stations... some shock jock who lost his job for less than this, or been at least suspended for a month or two. Why does Don, a repeat offender, keep getting away with it? I want to know.

CBS board member and former NAACP president Bruce S. Gordon said that Imus should not be allowed to come back even after the suspension, claiming that his remarks "crossed the line, a very bright line that divides our country."

President of NBC News Steve Capus announced on April 11, 2007, that MSNBC would no longer simulcast Imus in the Morning. The decision came on the same day that a few advertisers left Imus, and the network also said that employee concerns played a role. Capus said:

These comments were deeply hurtful to many, many people. And we've had any number of employee conversations, discussions, emails, phone calls. And when you listen to the passion and the people who come to the conclusion that there should not be any room for this sort of conversation and dialogue on our air, it was the only decision we could reach.

CBS Radio canceled Imus in the Morning the next day. CBS President and chief executive officer Leslie Moonves stated:

From the outset, I believe all of us have been deeply upset and revulsed by the statements that were made on our air about the young women who represented Rutgers University in the NCAA Women's Basketball Championship with such class, energy and talent. There has been much discussion of the effect language like this has on our young people, particularly young women of color trying to make their way in this society. That consideration has weighed most heavily on our minds as we made our decision.

The day before, CBS chairman Sumner Redstone said that he trusted that Moonves would "do the right thing", but he didn't elaborate. Moonves had met with Sharpton and Jesse Jackson shortly before the announcement was made. Moonves said in an internal memo that employee concerns were a factor in the decision to cancel Imus's show, but he also said that the decision was "about a lot more than Imus." Moonves said that CBS had to take Imus off the air in order to change "a culture that permits a certain level of objectionable expression that hurts and demeans a wide range of people."

General Motors (Imus's biggest advertiser), Staples Inc., GlaxoSmithKline, Sprint Nextel, PetMeds, American Express, and Procter & Gamble either pulled their ads outright or suspended advertising on Imus's show to protest his remarks. Bigelow Tea Company expressed uncertainty about renewing their ads with Imus's show.

Just hours after the announcement of his firing, Imus met with Stringer and her team at Drumthwacket, the New Jersey governor's mansion. The three-hour meeting was arranged by Buster Soaries, the former New Jersey Secretary of State and Stringer's pastor. New Jersey governor Jon Corzine planned to attend the meeting but was injured in a car accident on the way. Imus left without commenting, but Stringer said that the meeting went well. She later commented that they had accepted Imus's apology because he came to the meeting "in spite of the fact that he lost his job. So let's give him credit for that." She also emphasized that the basketball team had not called for Imus to be fired.

Senator John Kerry criticized CBS for being too harsh. He said that a "long suspension" would be "appropriate to pay a price on the airwaves but I'm not sure that it was appropriate to say you're off forever."

==== Subsequent litigation ====
Imus hired prominent attorney Martin Garbus by May 2, 2007, to pursue a wrongful termination lawsuit against CBS for the remaining $40 million on his five-year contract. The contract contained a clause indicating that CBS hired and supported Imus to produce "irreverent" and "controversial" programming. CBS announced a settlement with Imus on his $40 million contract on August 14. Rutgers basketball player Kia Vaughn filed a suit that same day against Imus, NBC Universal, CBS Corporation, MSNBC, CBS Radio, Viacom, Westwood One Radio, and Bernard McGuirk, citing slander, libel, and defamation of character. She was the only player to pursue legal damages. Vaughn dropped the lawsuit on September 11, 2007, citing her desire to concentrate on her studies and basketball training.

==== Return to radio and television ====
On July 8, 2007, the Drudge Report indicated that Imus would return to the air before the 2008 presidential election. Imus reached a settlement with CBS Radio over his contract on August 14, leaving him free to pursue other media opportunities.

On November 1, Citadel announced that they had agreed to a multi-year syndication contract with Imus. The new Imus in the Morning program was distributed nationally by Citadel Media and based at Citadel-owned WABC in New York City beginning in December. The New York Times reported on November 14 that Imus had agreed to terms with cable network RFD-TV to air a video simulcast of the new radio program. Charles McCord and Bernard McGuirk joined him in the new version of the show, and he returned to the airwaves on ABC Radio and RFD-TV on December 3. Sharpton said in an interview, "We'll monitor him; I'm not saying I'm going to throw a banquet for him and say welcome home. He has the right to make a living, but because he has such a consistent pattern with this we are going to monitor him to make sure he doesn't do it again." Jesse Jackson appeared on Imus in the Morning on April 4, 2008, to discuss the 40th anniversary of the assassination of Martin Luther King Jr., a booking that would have seemed impossible nearly a year before, when Jackson joined 50 demonstrators in Chicago demanding that "Imus must go", and many media commentators declared Imus's "rehabilitation" complete.

In September 2008, Imus signed a multi-year deal with Fox Business Network to simulcast his radio show Imus in the Morning.

=== Adam "Pacman" Jones controversy ===
Controversy once again surrounded Imus when he made the following statements regarding the suspension of Cowboys' cornerback Adam Jones:

Warner Wolf: Defensive back Adam "Pacman" Jones, recently signed by the Cowboys, here's a guy suspended all of 2007, following a shooting in a Vegas nightclub.

Don Imus: Well, stuff happens. You're in a nightclub, for God's sake. What do you think is gonna happen in a nightclub? People are drinking, and doing drugs. There are women there and people have guns. So there, go ahead.

Warner Wolf: Also, he's been arrested six times since being drafted by Tennessee in 2005.

Don Imus: What color is he?

Warner Wolf: He's African American.

Don Imus: Well there you go, now we know.

In response, Jones said, "I'm truly upset about the comments. Obviously Mr. Imus has problems with blacks. I'm upset, and I hope the station he works for handles it accordingly. I will pray for him." Imus said that his comments were misinterpreted. "I meant that he was being picked on because he's black." WABC vice president Phil Boyce said that it was unlikely that disciplinary action would be pursued against Imus, and none was.

=== Joe Barton ===
For two weeks in fall 2006, Imus delivered ongoing "rants" against Texas Congressman Joe Barton, describing him as "a lying fat little skunk from Texas", a "pipsqueak" and a "coward and a crybaby". Imus also called Barton a "congressional dirtbag", because Barton used his position as a committee chair to prevent passage of the Combating Autism Act, which would authorize funds for autism research. In the weeks before Congress recessed on September 29, 2006, Barton used his chairmanship to prevent the legislative proposal from coming to a vote in the House, rousing the ire of Imus and his wife, staunch supporters of autism research. The bill already had been passed unanimously by the Senate, but Barton opposed the Senate bill's stipulation that Centers of Excellence in Environmental Health and Autism investigate "a broad array of environmental factors that may have a possible role in autism spectrum disorders."

=== Lawsuits ===
Nichole Mallette sued Imus on November 29, 2004, for wrongful termination and defamation after a Thanksgiving 2003 incident in which she was allegedly fired from her position as nanny and escorted off his property at 4:15 a.m. Don and Deirdre Imus were allegedly upset over Mallette's possession of a cap-gun and pocketknife on ranch property.

One of the doctors who worked at the Imus Ranch, Dr. Howard Allen Pearson, sued Imus for slander and civil assault on July 8, 2005. Dr. Pearson accused Imus of threatening him during a July 13, 2004, confrontation at the ranch, after a disagreement over how to care for one of the children at the ranch. Imus subsequently referred to Pearson several times on the air as "an arrogant fucking doctor who doesn't mind letting a child suffer." Pearson was a world-famous pediatric cancer specialist who was the former chairman of the pediatrics department of the Yale Medical School as well as a co-founder (with Paul Newman) of another facility for ill children, the Hole in the Wall Gang Camp. In late 2005, Imus expressed his grievances about the case on the record to journalist Buzz Bissinger, for a Vanity Fair article that was published in the February 2006 issue.

Longtime sports commentator Warner Wolf was fired in 2016, after ten years on the show, and Wolf subsequently sued Imus and various other parties in New York for age discrimination. Wolf was in his late 70s at the time. The suit was dismissed in 2019 on a technicality: when he was fired, Wolf was a Florida resident who had been doing his segments from a home studio. The Manhattan Supreme Court ruled that the State of New York had no jurisdiction over this matter, and an appellate court agreed.

=== Other offensive remarks ===
Imus and his crew made offensive remarks both on and off the air. Some examples include:

- Imus said in 1984 concerning Howard Stern: "yes, Howard's a slut too, Lloyd. Plus a Jew bastard, and should be castrated, put in an oven." Stern played a clip of this interview in the news section of his November 5, 2007, show.
- Imus referred to black sports columnist Bill Rhoden as a "The New York Times quota hire".
- In the course of a 1998 interview with Mike Wallace on 60 Minutes, Imus told a producer off-camera that McGuirk was hired to perform "nigger jokes".
- Robin Quivers recounted that he called her a "nigger" to her face when she worked with him at WNBC and also called her a "spearchucker" on the air. Both Howard Stern and Quivers recalled when Imus called a black female co-worker, a secretary named Brenda, a "nigger" during their time at WNBC.
- Imus repeatedly referred to Arabs as "ragheads".
- The show's routines sometimes contained derogatory epithets for homosexuals, including "faggot" and various terms describing homosexuality.
- Imus referred to former Speaker of the House Newt Gingrich as "disgusting" and a "fat repulsive pig".

== Business interests ==
Imus was also a part-owner of Autobody Express stores with his late brother, Fred (who was a frequent caller to the radio show, commenting on NASCAR races, the NFL and related pop culture matters). The Autobody Express stores were located in Santa Fe, and inside the Mohegan Sun Native American Casino in Uncasville, Connecticut. In 2003, the company failed, and both stores closed.

Imus owned a small coffee and pastry store also located in the Mohegan Sun casino. The Autobody Express became Imus Ranch Foods, which offered its signature chips and salsa via online sales and in Northeastern stores, prior to the discontinuation of the Imus Ranch Foods line in 2014.

== Honors ==
Imus won four Marconi Awards, three for Major Market Personality of the Year (1990, 1992 and 1997) and one for Network Syndicated Personality (1994).

He was inducted into the National Radio Hall of Fame in 1989.

== Personal life ==
=== Family ===
Imus was married twice. Around 1969, he married his first wife Harriet Showalter, who had two daughters from a previous marriage, Nadine and Toni; Imus adopted Showalter's daughters. The couple had two daughters of their own, Ashley and Elizabeth. They divorced in 1979. Imus married Deirdre Coleman on December 17, 1994, and they stayed together until Imus's death in 2019. Their son Frederick Wyatt was born in 1998. Imus adopted his sixth child, Zach, in the 2010s.

At the time of his death, Imus resided in Brenham, Texas, at a ranch he acquired in 2013. He moved there full-time in 2015, after ending his Fox Business television simulcast in New York and from there started broadcasting his show solely on radio with the cast members broadcasting from the WABC radio studios. His former waterfront mansion in Westport, Connecticut, was sold that same year for $14.4 million.

According to journalist Robert D. McFadden, Imus was admired for his private charity work. He raised millions for the rehabilitation of wounded veterans of the Iraq war, children with cancer, and siblings of victims of sudden infant death syndrome, who had spent summers since 1999 on his ranch near Ribera, New Mexico.

=== Imus Ranch ===
In 1999, Imus and Deirdre founded the Imus Ranch, a working 4,000-acre (1,600 ha) cattle ranch near Ribera, New Mexico, 50 miles (80 km) southeast of Santa Fe, for children with cancer. The ranch was used as a tax deduction by Imus, and eventually, due to the personal use of the ranch by the Imus family, saw its property tax exemption reduced to 55%. The ranch was also criticized for the relatively high ratio of cost to each child served, which was over $25,000. The summer program serving children ended in 2014, following a rib injury Imus suffered in a fall from a horse.

In the three years from 2014 onward, the ranch reported losses on its Form 990, totaling nearly $3 million. The board members of the non-profit were Imus, his wife Deirdre, and Imus's agents, Vincent and Robert Andrews.

In October 2014, the ranch was offered for sale with an asking price of $32 million. The ranch repeatedly failed to sell, leading Imus to put the property up for auction in May 2017. The ranch was sold to broadcaster Patrick Gottsch in April 2018, for $12.5 million. A spokesperson for Imus stated that the non-profit organization had not been active since 2014.

=== Health and death ===
During his early years broadcasting in New York City, Imus was an alcoholic. In 1983, he was persuaded by Michael Lynne, then his lawyer, to attend Alcoholics Anonymous meetings. Imus attended meetings and ceased drinking in public, but continued to drink in private. On July 17, 1987, after a nine-day vodka binge, he attended rehabilitation at a Hanley-Hazelden treatment center in West Palm Beach, Florida, for six weeks and remained sober. By 1991, Imus had adopted a vegetarian diet.

In 2000, Imus suffered serious injuries after a fall from a horse at his ranch and broadcast several shows from a hospital. The injuries resulted in chronic breathing problems, especially at higher altitudes, which he spoke about on his program.

In March 2009, Imus was diagnosed with stage 2 prostate cancer. He was advised to have radiation treatments, but said he chose to treat the disease holistically.

Imus was hospitalized at Baylor Scott & White Medical Center in College Station, Texas, on December 24, 2019. He died three days later, on December 27, at the age of 79, of complications from lung disease. In reporting his death, David Bauder of the Associated Press said, "the quote that might best serve as Imus's epitaph" was the shock jock's statement to Vanity Fair magazine in 2006: "I talk to millions of people every day. I just like it when they can't talk back."

== Discography ==
Albums

- 1200 Hamburgers to Go (1972, RCA Records)
- One Sacred Chicken to Go (1973, RCA Records)
- This Honky's Nuts (1974, Bang Records)
- The Imus Ranch Record (2008, New West Records)
- The Imus Ranch Record II (2010, New West Records)

Singles

- I'm A Hot Rodder/The Boogala (credited as Jay Jay Imus & Freddy Ford) (1964, Challenge Records) (Freddy Ford is Imus's brother, Fred)
- From Adam's Rib To Women's Lib/The Ballad Of Rick (1971, RCA Records)
- 1200 Hamburgers To Go/Reverend Billy Sol Hargis (1972, RCA Records)
- Son of Checkers (The Watergate Case)/Oh Billy Sol Please Heal Us All (1973, RCA Records)
- Play That Country Juke Box (1975, RCA Records)
- Everybody Needs Milk (Just Give Me A Bottle Of Wine) (1975, RCA Records)
- The Presidential Debate (credited as Road Hog & The Neon Cactus) (1976, RCA Records)

== Books ==
- Imus, Don (1981). God's Other Son. Simon & Schuster. ISBN 978-0-671-22537-7.
- Imus, Don; Imus, Fred (1997). Two Guys Four Corners: Great Photographs, Great Times, and a Million Laughs. Villard. ISBN 978-0-679-45307-9.
