= Lawrence High School (Cedarhurst, New York) =

High school in Nassau County, New York, United States

Coordinates: 40.630115°N 73.735168°W

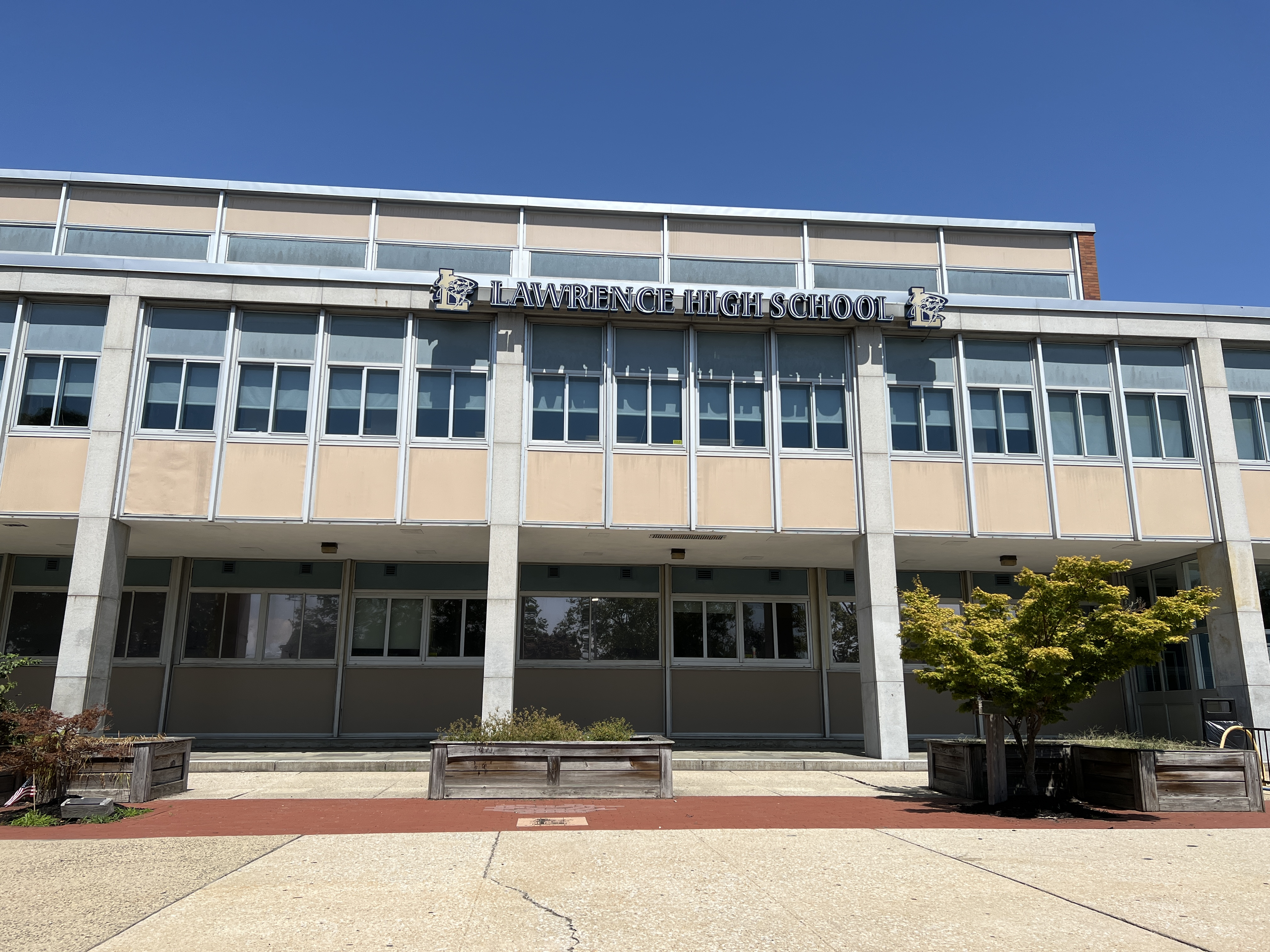

Location
- 2 Reilly Road; Cedarhurst, Nassau County, New York 11516; United States

Information
- Type: Public High School
- Motto: "Vestigia Nulla Retrorsum"
- Established: 1960
- School district: Lawrence Public Schools
- NCES School ID: 361683001505
- Principal: Jennifer Lagnado-Papp
- Teaching staff: 65.38 FTEs
- Grades: 9-12
- Enrollment: 807 (as of 2023–2024)
- Student to teacher ratio: 12.34
- Colors: Royal Blue; Gold
- Nickname: Golden Tornadoes
- Newspaper: Mental Pabulum
- Yearbook: Lawrencian
- Website: lawrencehighschool.lawrence.org
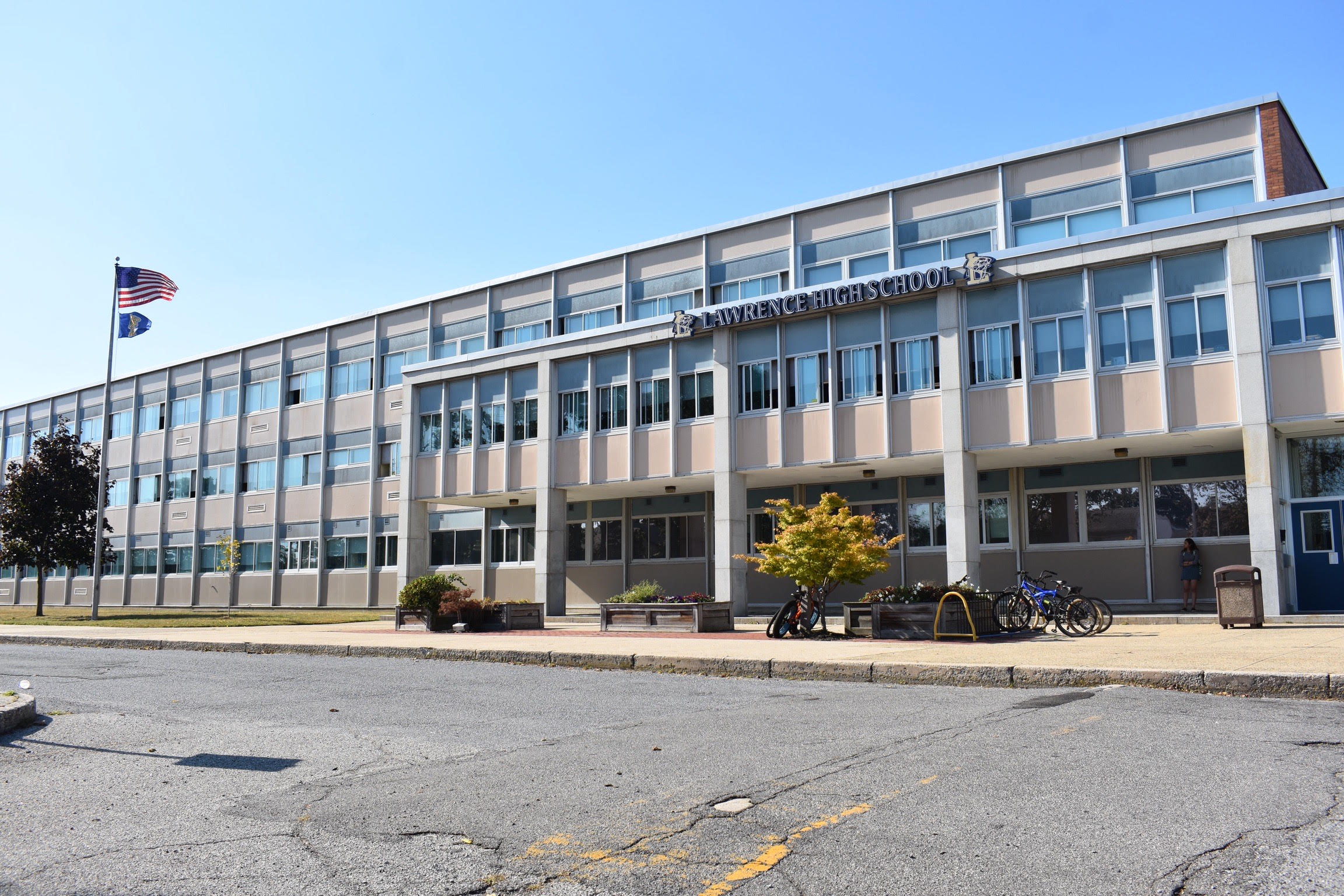

Lawrence High School is a four-year public high school located in Cedarhurst, Nassau County, New York, on Long Island's South Shore. It is part of Lawrence Public Schools, and the district's only public high school.

As of 2023–24, the school had an enrollment of 807 students and 64.4 classroom teachers (on an FTE basis), for a student–teacher ratio of 12.0:1. There were 519 students (67.4% of enrollment) eligible for free lunch and 21 (2.7% of students) eligible for reduced-cost lunch.

Communities in the district include Lawrence, Cedarhurst, Inwood, and Atlantic Beach. It also includes sections of the municipality of Woodsburgh, as well as the census-designated places of Woodmere.

== Details ==
Work study programs are available, as is an Outward Bound program affiliated with Hofstra University. Students can earn college credit by taking college-level courses in conjunction with C.W. Post College and Syracuse University. The New York State Education Commissioner has recognized the library as an "Electronic Doorway Library," one of the first libraries in the state officially designed for its pioneering use of computers and telecommunications technology.

The school mascot is the Golden Tornado. The school colors are blue and gold (royal blue and gold). The yearbook is the Lawrencian and the student newspaper is called Mental Pabulum. The school motto is "Vestigia Nulla Retrorsum" (lit. I never retrace my steps, i.e., "No Stepping Back").

== Sports ==
The team won the Long Island Football Championships in 1995 and 2006. In 2011 it lost a record-setting 78–61 non-overtime championship game to Sayville High School. It was also runner-up in the game in 1997, 2007 and 2009.

Lawrence High School won the Long Island Class II football championship, defeating heavily favored Bellport High School 28–27 at Stony Brook University on November 25, 2006.

Lawrence High School won the 2012 Long Island Class III football championship by defeating Sayville 21–20. Then in November 2013, Lawrence defeated Huntington 49–35 in the Class III LIC for their 2nd back-to-back title. In November 2014, Lawrence beat Sayville 40–35 and won the 2014 LIC Class III.

Lawrence High School's bowling team won the Conference 5 Title in the 2006 season. Lawrence High School's varsity gymnastics team also won a conference title in 2003.

The 2011 comedy Win Win, starring Paul Giamatti, was filmed in the Lawrence High School wrestling room.

== Notable alumni ==
- Lyle Alzado (1949–1992), NFL defensive tackle for Oakland Raiders and Denver Broncos.
- Chris Collier (born 2000), NFL football running back for the Las Vegas Raiders
- Marc Stuart Dreier (born 1950), lawyer who was sentenced to 20 years in federal prison in 2009 for committing investment fraud using a Ponzi scheme
- Harrison Greenbaum (born 1986), comedian, magician and Andy Kaufman Award winner
- Mickey Hart (born 1943), Grateful Dead percussionist
- Jon Heyman (born 1961), baseball writer
- Todd P. Haskell (born 1962, class of 1980), diplomat and career Foreign Service officer who served as the United States Ambassador to the Republic of the Congo
- Helen Hicks (1911–1974), pro golfer, one of 13 co-founders of LPGA in 1950
- Wendy Kaufman (born 1958), best known for her commercial appearance as "Wendy, the Snapple Lady"
- Michael Kimmel (born 1951), author, professor, sociologist, gender activist
- Arthur L. Kopit (1937–2021), playwright
- Frederic Lebow (born 1956), screenwriter, While You Were Sleeping
- Gilbert Levine (born 1948), conductor
- Shawn Levy (born 1961), author, journalist, poet
- Peggy Lipton (1946–2019), actress
- Steve Madden (born 1958), shoe designer
- Ira Magaziner (born 1947, class of 1965), politician who served as an aide to President Bill Clinton
- Shane Olivea (1981–2022), offensive tackle who played in the NFL for San Diego Chargers
- Evan Roberts (born 1983), sports radio personality who co-hosted Joe & Evan with Joe Benigno and Carton & Roberts with Craig Carton.
- Phyllis Rose (born 1942, class of 1960) professor, Wesleyan University; author, Parallel Lives, The Year of Reading Proust
- Connie Russell (1923–1990), singer and actress
- Aaron Russo (1943–2007), entertainment manager and producer; Emmy Award winner; politician
- Tyler "Lil Tecca" Sharpe (born 2002), rapper, singer and songwriter
- Michael Stern (born 1979), real estate developer
- Bradley Tusk (born 1973), businessman, venture capitalist, political strategist and author

== Notable faculty ==
- Frank Scoblete, English teacher

== Alumni links ==
- Class of 1959 Alumni Site
- Class of 1961 Alumni Site
