= Benigno =

Benigno may refer to:

Surname

- Giorgio Benigno Salviati (died 1520), Bosnian philosopher and churchman
- Francesco Benigno (born 1967), Italian actor
- Joe Benigno (born 1953), American sports radio personality
- Teodoro Benigno (1923–2005), Filipino journalist

Given name

- Benigno Aquino Sr. (1894–1947), Filipino politician and Speaker of the Second Philippine Republic National Assembly from 1943 to 1944
- Benigno Aquino Jr. (1932–1983), Philippine Senator, son of Benigno Sr., and governor of Tarlac
- Benigno Aquino III (1960–2021), Filipino politician, son of Benigno Jr., and president of the Philippines
- Benigno Fitial (born 1945), governor of the Northern Mariana Islands
- Paolo Benigno Aquino IV (born 1977), Filipino politician, nephew of Benigno Jr.
- Benigno Perez (born 1990), Filipino model, TV host and actor
- Benigno Zaccagnini (1912-1989), Italian politician and physician

Other

- Benigno & Roberts, show hosted by Joe Benigno
- San Benigno Canavese a municipality in the province of Turin

== See also ==
- Benign
- Benigni (disambiguation)
- Benignus (disambiguation)
