= Frank Scoblete =

American author (born 1947)

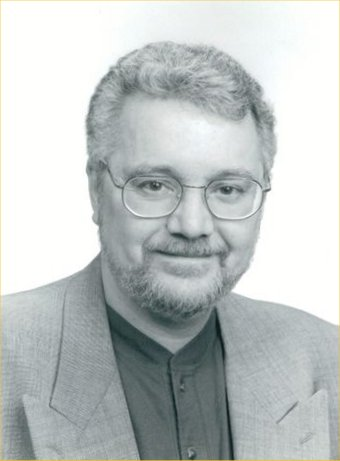
- Born: 1947 (age 78–79); Brooklyn, New York
- Occupation: Writer
- Writing career
- Pen name: King Scobe
- Subjects: Blackjack, craps, general gambling
- Website: www.goldentouchcraps.com

Frank Scoblete (born 1947) is an American author who has written both under his own name and King Scobe about casino gambling. Referred to by The Washington Post as "a widely published authority on casino games," his books include Beat the Craps out of the Casinos, Golden Touch Blackjack Revolution, and Beat the One-Armed Bandits. He has written and appeared in television documentaries such as the "What Would You Do If ...?" program on The Travel Channel, written numerous columns for gambling magazines and websites, and produced a series of videotapes and DVDs, with most of his work being about the games of craps and blackjack.

== Early life and education ==
Scoblete grew up in Bay Ridge, Brooklyn, New York, the older of two children. He attended Our Lady of Angels elementary school, and then St. John's Prep. According to his website, he had a full athletic scholarship for baseball and basketball. He graduated high school in 1965, and then went on to college, this time under an academic scholarship, majoring in history, literature, and philosophy. According to his site, he has three Master's degrees, and graduated in 1969.

== Career ==
From 1969 to 1974 he worked as a writer, editor, and eventually publisher of Island Magazine, a Long Island news magazine. He also had his own radio program "Frank Scoblete Live!", and worked for a time as a high school teacher, teaching English and an innovative class in Science Fiction at Lawrence High School on Long Island where he was known as "Mr. Scobe" or just "Scobe".

In 1975 Scoblete experimented with acting, and in 1979 co-founded The Other Vic Theatre Company, a professional touring troupe that played dinner theatres, resorts, and charities. During his time with the Company, Scoblete produced, directed, and acted in approximately 50 plays. In 1985, while researching the role of a gambler for the play The Only Game in Town, Scoblete and his co-star Alene Paone went to Atlantic City to do some research, which made them realize that they liked gambling more than acting. The play toured for four months.

Scoblete sold his share of the theatre company in 1989, and starting writing columns for gaming magazines such as WIN Magazine. He spent the majority of his time from 1986 to 1992 in the casinos. His first book on the subject was Beat the Craps Out of the Casinos, published in 1991 by Paone Press, a mail-order publishing house founded by his future wife Paone, who has also taught at Lawrence Middle School. Scoblete and Paone married in 1993, and spent their honeymoon playing blackjack on a Mississippi riverboat.

== Books ==
Along with his books and columns, Scoblete has also written for television, such as the Travel Channel's "What Would You Do If ...?" program, in which he also appears as an expert. He has been cited as a consultant in newspapers such as the Detroit News and Kansas City Star. In 2003 during the gambling scandal involving ex-Education Secretary William Bennett, Scoblete was cited as a source in The Washington Post, which described Scoblete as "a widely published authority on casino games."

Scoblete also self-published, via Paone Press, a quarterly magazine called The New Chance and Circumstance. He also writes articles about gambling for websites such as worldcasinodirectory.com, gambling.co.uk, and his own site goldentouchcraps.com. As of 2007, he writes the "Ask Frank" column for Casino City Times.

He is a frequent speaker on the subject of card counting and dice control, and gives weekend seminars on the exact techniques. He has been known to sponsor "gamblers jamborees" where he is joined by fellow authors and analysts such as Dr. Henry Tamburin, John Grochowski, Dr. Donald Catlin, John Robison, and Jean Scott.

He sponsored a "World Craps Championships" weekend in 2006, which drew 166 players.

== Personal life ==
Scoblete lives in New York with his wife Alene Paone.
