= St. John Vianney High School (New Jersey) =

Catholic high school in Monmouth County, New Jersey, US

Saint John Vianney High School

Location
- 540-A Line Road; Holmdel Township, Monmouth County, New Jersey, New Jersey 07733; United States
- 40°24′7″N 74°12′28″W

Information
- Type: Private, Coeducational
- Motto: Knowledge - Commitment - Involvement
- Religious affiliation: Roman Catholic
- Established: 1969
- School district: Diocese of Trenton
- President: Steven DiMezza
- Principal: Margaret J. Kane
- Faculty: 64.4 FTEs
- Grades: 9–12
- Enrollment: 979 (as of 2017–18)
- Student to teacher ratio: 15.2:1
- Campus size: 38 acres (150,000 m^{2})
- Colors: Black; Gold; White
- Athletics conference: Shore Conference
- Team name: Lancers
- Rival: Red Bank Catholic High School, Middletown High School South, Manasquan High School
- Accreditation: AdvancED
- Publication: Excalibur (literary magazine)
- Newspaper: Lancer's Point
- Yearbook: Cavalier
- Tuition: $15,775 (2024–25)
- Website: www.sjvhs.com

St. John Vianney High School is a coeducational four-year Catholic high school on a 38-acre (150,000 m^{2}) campus in Holmdel Township, Monmouth County, New Jersey. It is operated under the supervision of the Diocese of Trenton and accredited by AdvancED.

As of the 2017–18 school year, the school had an enrollment of 979 students and 64.4 classroom teachers (on an FTE basis), for a student–teacher ratio of 15.2:1. The school's student body was 82.8% (811) White, 5.0% (49) Hispanic, 4.9% (48) Asian, 3.7% (36) Black and 3.3% (32) two or more races.

The school motto is "Knowledge – Commitment – Involvement". The St. John Vianney High School Lancers wear the school colors of Gold, White and Black.

Students are required to wear uniforms, which change seasonally. In the fall and spring, a more casual polo shirt is worn paired with khaki pants or a plaid kilt. Winter requires more formal attire with white button-downs and pullovers. Boys are required to wear belts and ties in the winter as well. The only shoes allowed are Sperry boat shoes.

== History ==
Saint John Vianney High School (SJVHS) was founded in 1969 by the Roman Catholic Diocese of Trenton to serve the rapidly growing Catholic population in Monmouth County during the suburban expansion of the late 1960s and early 1970s. Named after Saint Jean-Baptiste Vianney, the patron saint of parish priests, the school was built on a 38-acre campus in Holmdel Township, strategically located near the Garden State Parkway to draw students from across the northern Shore region.

The school opened with an initial enrollment of under 300 students and has since grown to accommodate over 1,000 students annually. It was staffed initially by the Sisters of Charity of Convent Station and several lay teachers. Over time, the school transitioned to a predominantly lay faculty while maintaining a strong Catholic identity.

Throughout the 1980s and 1990s, the school expanded its facilities, including new classroom wings, a modern library, and upgraded science laboratories. In 2006, the school completed a major renovation of its athletic complex, including the construction of a new 12,000-square-foot athletic center and a 3,600-square-foot weight room.

In recent decades, Saint John Vianney High School has broadened its academic offerings, launching specialized academies in business, military leadership (through the Air Force JROTC), and most recently, law. It continues to serve students in grades 9–12 from Monmouth, Ocean, and Middlesex Counties, maintaining accreditation from the Middle States Association of Colleges and Schools since 1977.

== Student body ==
Saint John Vianney High School serves a diverse population of students from across Monmouth, Middlesex, and Ocean counties in central New Jersey. As a regional Catholic high school within the Diocese of Trenton, SJV draws students from more than 30 different parochial, public, and private middle schools.

Saint John Vianney maintains transportation partnerships and private busing routes to accommodate students commuting from outlying areas, and it maintains a strong alumni network throughout the region, contributing to continued multi-generational enrollment.

== Education ==
Saint John Vianney High School (SJVHS) offers a rigorous college preparatory curriculum structured around a 4x4 block scheduling system. This format divides the academic year into two semesters, during which students enroll in four courses per semester. Each class meets daily for 77 minutes, allowing for in-depth exploration of subjects and mimicking the pace of college-level courses.

The school provides a diverse academic portfolio, including Advanced Placement (AP) courses, Honors classes, and dual enrollment options through partnerships with local colleges. Specialized academies such as the Early College Academy, Business Academy, and Air Force Junior ROTC program offer students career-focused tracks. A Pre-Law Academy is scheduled to launch in Fall 2025.

Technology integration is central to SJVHS's academic environment. Each student is issued a tablet PC, and coursework is managed via the Canvas Learning Management System, promoting digital literacy and readiness for higher education and the workforce.

Beyond the classroom, SJVHS offers more than 35 student-run clubs and over 30 athletic programs. Facilities include a 12,000-square-foot (1,100 m^{2}) athletic center, a 3,600-square-foot (330 m^{2}) weight room, advanced science labs, and a renovated theater, all situated on a 38-acre (15 ha) campus.

=== Pre-Law Academy ===
Saint John Vianney High School offers a Pre-Law Academy as part of its academic enrichment programs. Designed for students interested in legal studies and related fields, the Pre-Law Academy provides an interdisciplinary curriculum that blends social studies, government, philosophy, and communication skills with a focus on law and ethics.

Students in the program take courses in constitutional law, criminal justice, and legal writing, and they participate in mock trial competitions, guest lectures from practicing attorneys and judges, and field trips to courthouses and law schools. The academy aims to equip students with critical thinking, public speaking, and analytical reasoning skills essential for legal careers.

Admission to the Pre-Law Academy is selective and requires a written application, teacher recommendations, and a demonstrated interest in legal studies. Students who successfully complete the academy may earn distinction upon graduation and are often well-prepared to pursue undergraduate studies in political science, pre-law, or related disciplines.

=== Air Force Junior ROTC (AFJROTC) ===
Saint John Vianney High School hosts a unit of the Air Force Junior Reserve Officer Training Corps (AFJROTC), designated as NJ-20151. Established in 2015, the program is a partnership between the school and the United States Air Force aimed at developing students into responsible citizens and future leaders.

AFJROTC cadets at Saint John Vianney participate in a curriculum that includes aerospace science, leadership education, physical fitness, and community service. The program promotes values such as integrity, service, and excellence, and offers students opportunities to take part in drill competitions, leadership camps, and field trips to military installations.

Participation in the program is elective, and cadets are not required to enter military service. However, successful completion of the AFJROTC curriculum can improve students’ eligibility for college ROTC scholarships and advanced rank upon enlistment in the military.

== Athletics ==
The St. John Vianney High School Lancers compete in Division B North of the Shore Conference, an athletic conference comprised of public and private high schools in Monmouth and Ocean counties along the Jersey Shore. The league operates under the jurisdiction of the New Jersey State Interscholastic Athletic Association (NJSIAA). With 718 students in grades 10–12, the school was classified by the NJSIAA for the 2019–20 school year as Non-Public A for most athletic competition purposes, which included schools with an enrollment of 381 to 1,454 students in that grade range (equivalent to Group II for public schools). The school's co-op team with Ranney School was classified by the NJSIAA as Non-Public Group B (equivalent to Group I/II for public schools) for football for 2024–2026, which included schools with 140 to 686 students.

The school participates as the host school / lead agency for joint cooperative ice hockey team with Ranney School. The co-op program operates under an agreement scheduled to expire at the end of the 2023–24 school year.

The boys' cross country team won the Non-Public Group B state championship in 1973.

The girls' cross country team won the Group II state championship in 1978 and 1981, and won the Non-Public A title in 1983.

The 1978 boys' basketball team came into the playoffs with a 12–12 record and went on to win the Non-Public Group B state title, defeating runner-up Our Lady of the Valley High School by a score of 65–58 in the tournament final.

The football team won the Non-Public A South state sectional championship in 1980.

The baseball team won the Non-Public Group A state championship in 1981 (defeating Saint Joseph of the Palisades High School in the tournament final) and 2014 (vs. St. Joseph Regional High School of Montvale). In 2014, St. John Vianney's baseball team defeated Gloucester Catholic High School by a score of 3–2 to win the NJSIAA Non-Public South A sectional final and won the state Non-Public A title as an 8 seed in their own section when they defeated St. Joseph Regional High School, the representative from North A by a score of 3–1 in the state championship game.

The girls' tennis team won the Non-Public A state championship in 1988, defeating runner-up Academy of the Holy Angels in the final match of the tournament.

The girl' basketball team won the Non-Public Group A state sectional championship in 1990 (defeating Academy of the Holy Angels in the tournament final), 1991 (vs. Immaculata High School), 1992 (vs. Queen of Peace High School), 1993 (vs. Paramus Catholic High School). 1994 (vs. Immaculate), 1997 (vs. Paramus Catholic), 1998 (vs. Pope John XXIII High School), 1999 (vs. Immaculate Heart Academy), 2003 (vs. Immaculata), 2005 (vs. Roselle Catholic High School), 2008 (vs. Morris Catholic High School), 2009 (vs. Immaculate Heart), 2010 (vs. Immaculate Heart), 2011 (vs. DePaul Catholic High School), 2015 (vs. Immaculate Heart), 2016 (vs. Immaculate Heart) and 2022 (vs. Immaculate Heart), and won the Non-Public B state title in 1995 (vs. Mount Saint Dominic Academy). In 2020, the school was declared as Non-Public South A sectional champion, after the finals were cancelled due to COVID-19. The 17 state group titles are the most of any school in the state. The team has won the Tournament of Champions in 1991 (vs. second-seeded Ridgewood High School in the finals), 1993 (vs. fourth-seeded West Side High School), 1995 (vs. second-seeded West Milford High School), 1997 (vs. second-seeded Piscataway High School), 1999 (vs. second-seeded West Morris Mendham High School), 2009 (vs. fourth-seeded Colts Neck High School) and 2016 (vs. second-seeded Manasquan High School). The program's seven titles in the Tournament of Champions are the most of any school. In 2005, the girls' basketball team won the Non-Public, South A title over Red Bank Catholic High School, 51–39. The team moved on to the group championship, defeating Roselle Catholic High School to earn the state group championship. The team advanced to the finals of the 2005 girls' basketball Tournament of Champions, falling to Woodrow Wilson High School, 64–45. In 2008, the girls' basketball team won the Parochial A state championship and moved on to lose in the Tournament of Champions semifinals to Malcolm X Shabazz High School by a score of 75–35. In 2009, the Lady Lancer basketball team, led by Coach Dawn Karpell, won the Non-Public A title with a 77–46 win against Immaculate Heart in the finals at the Ritacco Center in Toms River and was ranked No. 1 in the New York Metropolitan region by the MSG network after winning their record sixth Tournament of Champions title, defeating Colts Neck by a score of 56–44 in the tournament final. The team won the 2010 NJSIAA Non-Public A state title and finished the season as the No. 2 ranked team in the state by The Star-Ledger after a 53–39 win over Immaculate Heart that marked the team's 13th victory in a Non-Public A final with no defeats. The Lady Lancers lost to Neptune High School by a score of 67–48 in the finals of the Tournament of Champions at the Izod Center.

The wrestling team won the Non-Public Group B South state sectional championship in 1995 and 1996, and won the Non-Public B state championship in 1995.

The 2000 girls' soccer team won the Parochial South A state championship, defeating Holy Cross High School 4–0 in the tournament final.

=== Softball ===
The school's softball team has won the Non-Public Group A state championship seven times: in 2001 (against Paramus Catholic High School), 2002 (against Immaculate Heart Academy), 2004 (against Mount Saint Dominic Academy), 2010 (against Paramus Catholic), 2011 (against Immaculate Heart), 2013 (against Immaculate Heart), and 2018 (against Mount Saint Dominic). These seven group titles are tied for seventh-most in state history.

The 2001 team captured the program's first state title with a 2–1 win over Paramus Catholic.

In 2002, the team defeated Red Bank Catholic High School 3–2 in the Parochial South A sectional final and went on to win the state championship over Immaculate Heart Academy.

The 2004 team went 33–0, setting a state record for most wins in a single season by a girls' softball team. They shut out Red Bank Catholic 5–0 to win the South A sectional, then defeated Mount Saint Dominic Academy 1–0 in the state final on a seventh-inning error that allowed the winning run to score.

Led by Coach Kim Lombardi, the 2010 team beat Paramus Catholic 4–1 in the state final. Junior pitcher Jen Retzer threw a complete game, four-hitter with nine strikeouts.

The 2011 team repeated as champions, defeating Immaculate Heart Academy in the final, and earned a national ranking in the ESPN Rise Fab 50.

In 2013, the Lancers again defeated Immaculate Heart for the state title and were ranked as the No. 1 softball team in New Jersey by NJ.com.

St. John Vianney captured its most recent state title in 2018, winning the Non-Public A championship over Mount Saint Dominic Academy. The team finished the season 27–1 and was again ranked among the state's top programs.

The Lancers were ranked as the state's #1 team by NJ.com in 2002, 2004, 2011, and 2013.

=== Ice Hockey ===
The ice hockey team won the Handchen Cup in 2013, 2018 and 2019.

=== Grils' Bowling ===
The girls' bowling team was the Group I state championship in 2019.

=== Cheerleeding ===
The cheerleading team won the NJCDCA Non-Public state championship title in 2017.

== Rivalries ==
Saint John Vianney High School maintains several notable athletic rivalries, particularly within the Shore Conference.

One of the school's most prominent rivalries is with Red Bank Catholic High School. The two Catholic schools have frequently competed for division titles in sports such as football, girls basketball, and softball. Their matchups often draw large crowds and heightened media attention, especially in the postseason. In girls basketball, the two programs have dominated the Shore Conference for decades, with multiple state titles between them and nationally ranked teams.

Another key rivalry is with Middletown South, especially in football and boys basketball. Given the geographic proximity—less than five miles apart—the schools' contests have become staples of local sports culture in Monmouth County.

In recent years, the girls soccer and softball teams have developed competitive rivalries with programs such as Donovan Catholic High School and Manasquan High School, with championship implications often on the line.

== Popular culture ==
Nine girls from this school were featured on an episode of Project Runway in 2008, in which each designer was asked to create a modern prom dress for each girl.

== Notable alumni ==
- Zoe Brooks (born 2005, class of 2023), college basketball player for the NC State Wolfpack
- Anthony Brown (born 1998), American football quarterback for the Oregon Ducks.
- Johnny Buchanan (born 1999), American football linebacker who played for the St. Louis Battlehawks of the XFL
- Robert D. Clifton (born 1968), politician who has represented the 12th Legislative District in the New Jersey General Assembly since 2012.
- Sydney Cummings (born 1999), footballer who plays as a defender for the Brown Bears and the Guyana women's national team.
- Pamela Day, contestant on the second season of The Apprentice.
- Terry Deitz (born 1959), third-place finisher on Survivor: Panama.
- Jim Hunter (born 1959, class of 1977), sports announcer, formerly with the Baltimore Orioles baseball team.
- Ishmael Hyman (born 1995), American football wide receiver for the Tampa Bay Buccaneers of the NFL.
- Evan Louro (born 1996), soccer player who plays as a goalkeeper for the New York Red Bulls in Major League Soccer.
- Christian Miele (born 1981), politician who has been a member of the Maryland House of Delegates since 2015.
- Frankie Montecalvo (born 1990, class of 2009), racecar driver in the WeatherTech SportsCar Championship, 2015 Pirelli World Challenge GTA Driver's Champion.
- Jodi Lyn O'Keefe (born 1978), actress.
- Jerry Recco (born 1974), sports radio personality, who is a morning anchor on the Boomer and Gio program on sports radio station WFAN in New York City.
- Anthony Stolarz (born 1994), professional ice hockey goaltender for the Anaheim Ducks of the National Hockey League.

== Notable faculty ==
- Monica Aksamit (born 1990), fencing coach who represented her country at the 2016 Summer Olympics where she earned a bronze medal in the Women's Saber Team event.
