= Benigni =

Benigni is a surname. Notable people with the surname include:

- Léon Benigni (1892–1948), French fashion illustrator
- Mark D. Benigni (born 1972), American politician from Connecticut
- Roberto Benigni (born 1952), Italian actor, comedian, screenwriter and director
- Umberto Benigni (1862–1934), Italian Catholic priest and church historian

== See also ==
- 21662 Benigni (1999 RC), a main-belt asteroid
- Benign
- Benigno (disambiguation)
- Benignus (disambiguation)
- Benini
