= The Carton Show =

American sports radio program

The Carton Show with Craig Carton & Chris McMonigle
- Genre: Sports radio
- Running time: 5 hours
- Country of origin: United States
- Language: English
- Home station: WFAN and WFAN-FM
- Hosted by: Craig Carton and Chris McMonigle
- Original release: January 5, 2026 – present
- Website: www.audacy.com/wfan/shows/the-carton-show-with-craig-carton-chris-mcmonigle

The Carton Show with Craig Carton & Chris McMonigle is an American sports radio program hosted by Craig Carton and Chris McMonigle. The program airs weekday afternoons from 2:00 to 7:00 p.m. Eastern Time on New York sports radio stations WFAN and WFAN-FM. It is also available nationwide through the Audacy website and mobile application.

The show debuted on January 5, 2026, as part of a restructuring of WFAN's weekday lineup and marked Carton's third full-time tenure with the station. The program discusses New York-area professional sports teams, major national sports stories and other current topics through commentary, interviews and listener calls.

== History ==
Reports of Carton's planned return to WFAN emerged in December 2025, following the cancellation of his morning television program, Breakfast Ball, on Fox Sports 1. Audacy officially announced the new show on December 10, naming McMonigle as Carton's co-host.

McMonigle had previously worked at WFAN as a producer and overnight host. He had also produced Carton's former afternoon program, Carton and Roberts, which Carton hosted with Evan Roberts.

The creation of the show was part of a wider change to WFAN's schedule. Evan & Tiki, hosted by Roberts and Tiki Barber, moved from afternoon drive to the midday time slot, while the program hosted by Brandon Tierney and Sal Licata was discontinued.The Carton Show took over the weekday afternoon-drive period from 2:00 to 7:00 p.m.

The first broadcast aired on January 5, 2026. James L. Dolan, the executive chairman and chief executive officer of Madison Square Garden Sports, appeared as a guest during the debut episode. Dolan made three appearances on the program during its first six months.

== Format and distribution ==
The program is broadcast live on WFAN's AM and FM frequencies in the New York metropolitan area. Live broadcasts and recorded segments are available nationally through Audacy's digital platforms. Full episodes and selected segments are also distributed as a podcast.

The show's discussions primarily concern the New York Yankees, New York Mets, New York Giants, New York Jets, New York Knicks, Brooklyn Nets and other New York-area teams. Its format combines sports commentary and debate with interviews, listener telephone calls, comedy and discussions of subjects outside sports.

== Reception ==
The program and WFAN's revised schedule received substantial coverage in the New York sports media during the show's first week.

According to Nielsen Audio data covering March through May 2026, The Carton Show ranked first among talk-radio stations in the New York market for men between the ages of 25 and 54 and men between the ages of 35 and 54.

== See also ==
- Craig Carton
- WFAN (AM)
- Sports radio
