= Benignus =

Benignus may refer to:

- Saint Benignus of Dijon (3rd century), martyr and patron saint of Dijon, Burgundy (France)
- Saint Benignus of Todi (d. 303), martyr at Todi, Umbria (Italy)
- Saint Benignus of Armagh (died 467), Irish disciple of St. Patrick
- Saint Benignus (bishop of Milan) (died 472), archbishop of Milan (Italy), 465–472
- Saint Benignus of Malcesine, (Benigno di Malcesine) often referenced with Carus of Malcesine
- Saint Benignus of Fontenelle (fl. 725), abbot of Fontenelle Abbey (France)
- Georgius Benignus de Salviatis (died 1520), Bosnian theologian
- Benignus von Safferling (1825–1895), General of the Infantry and war minister under Otto of Bavaria

== See also ==
- Benignity, medical term
- Benigno (disambiguation)
- Benigni (disambiguation), surname
