= Benini distribution =

Continuous probability distribution

Benini
- Parameters: $\alpha>0$ shape (real) $\beta>0$ shape (real) $\sigma>0$ scale (real)
- Support: $x>\sigma$
- PDF: $e^{-\alpha\log{\frac{x}{\sigma}}-\beta\left[\log{\frac{x}{\sigma}}\right]^2} \left(\frac{\alpha}{x}+\frac{2\beta\log{\frac{x}{\sigma}}}{x}\right)$
- CDF: $1-e^{-\alpha\log{\frac{x}{\sigma}}-\beta[\log{\frac{x}{\sigma}}]^2}$
- Mean: $\sigma+\tfrac{\sigma}{\sqrt{2\beta}} H_{-1}\left(\tfrac{-1+\alpha}{\sqrt{2\beta}}\right)$ where $H_n(x)$ is the "probabilists' Hermite polynomials"
- Median: $\sigma \left(e^{\frac{-\alpha+\sqrt{\alpha^2+\beta\log{16}}}{2\beta}}\right)$
- Mode: $\sigma e^{\frac{\sqrt{8\beta + 1} - 2\alpha - 1}{4\beta}}$ if $\beta > \alpha(\alpha + 1)/2$, otherwise $\sigma$
- Variance: $\left(\sigma^2+\tfrac{2\sigma^2}{\sqrt{2\beta}} H_{-1}\left(\tfrac{-2+\alpha}{\sqrt{2\beta}}\right)\right)-\mu^2$

In probability, statistics, economics, and actuarial science, the Benini distribution is a continuous probability distribution that is a statistical size distribution often applied to model incomes, severity of claims or losses in actuarial applications, and other economic data. Its tail behavior decays faster than a power law, but not as fast as an exponential. This distribution was introduced by Rodolfo Benini in 1905. Somewhat later than Benini's original work, the distribution has been independently discovered or discussed by a number of authors.

== Distribution ==
The Benini distribution $\operatorname{Benini}(\alpha, \beta, \sigma)$ is a three-parameter distribution, which has cumulative distribution function (CDF)

$$F(x) = 1 - \exp\big\{-\alpha(\log x - \log \sigma) - \beta(\log x - \log \sigma)^2\big\}
= 1 - \left(\frac{x}{\sigma}\right)^{-\alpha - \beta \log{\left(\frac{x}{\sigma}\right)}},$$

where $x \geq \sigma$, shape parameters α, β > 0, and σ > 0 is a scale parameter.

For parsimony, Benini considered only the two-parameter model (with α = 0), with CDF

$$F(x) = 1 - \exp\big\{-\beta(\log x - \log \sigma)^2\big\} =
1 - \left(\frac{x}{\sigma}\right)^{-\beta(\log x - \log \sigma)}.$$

The density of the two-parameter Benini model is

$$f(x) = \frac{2\beta}{x} \exp\left\{-\beta\left[\log\left(\frac{x}{\sigma}\right)\right]^2\right\}
\log\left(\frac{x}{\sigma}\right), \quad x \geq \sigma > 0.$$

== Simulation ==
A two-parameter Benini variable can be generated by the inverse probability transform method. For the two-parameter model, the quantile function (inverse CDF) is

$$F^{-1}(u) = \sigma \exp\sqrt{-\frac{1}{\beta} \log(1 - u)}, \quad 0 < u < 1.$$

== Related distributions ==
- If $X \sim \operatorname{Benini}(\alpha, 0, \sigma)$, then X has a Pareto distribution with $x_\text{m} = \sigma.$
- If $X \sim \operatorname{Benini}(0, \tfrac{1}{2\sigma^2}, 1)$, then $X \sim e^U$, where $U \sim \operatorname{Rayleigh}(\sigma).$

== Software ==
The two-parameter Benini distribution density, probability distribution, quantile function and random-number generator are implemented in the VGAM package for R, which also provides maximum-likelihood estimation of the shape parameter.

== See also ==
- Conditional probability distribution
- Joint probability distribution
- Quasiprobability distribution
- Empirical probability distribution
- Histogram
- Riemann–Stieltjes integral application to probability theory
