= Benini =

Benini is an Italian surname. Notable people with the surname include:

- Bull Benini (1921–2015), United States Air Force chief master sergeant
- Clarice Benini (1905–1976), Italian chess player
- Fides Benini (1929–1993), Italian swimmer
- Maurizio Benini (born 1952), Italian conductor and composer
- Paulo André Cren Benini (born 1983), Brazilian football player
- Rodolfo Benini (1862–1956), Italian statistician and demographer
- Sigismondo Benini (17th century), Italian painter
- Zenone Benini (1902–1976), Italian industrialist and politician

== See also ==
- Benigni (disambiguation)
