= Chris Collier =

American football player (born 2000)

Profile
- Position: Running back

Personal information
- Born: March 24, 2000 (age 26); Lawrence, New York, U.S.
- Listed height: 5 ft 10 in (1.78 m)
- Listed weight: 203 lb (92 kg)

Career information
- High school: Lawrence (Cedarhurst, New York)
- College: Nassau CC (2018–2019); Wagner (2020–2022); Lock Haven (2023)
- NFL draft: 2024: undrafted

Career history
- Baltimore Ravens (2024); Las Vegas Raiders (2024–2026)

Career NFL statistics as of 2025
- Return yards: 286
- Rushing yards: 12
- Rushing average: 2.4
- Stats at Pro Football Reference

Chris Collier (born March 24, 2000) is an American professional football running back. He played college football for the Nassau Lions, Wagner Seahawks, and Lock Haven Bald Eagles.

== Early life ==
Collier was born on March 24, 2000, and grew up in Lawrence, Nassau County, New York. He started playing football at age six and attended Lawrence High School where he played running back. As a senior, he helped Lawrence compile a record of 10–2 while running for over 1,800 yards and 25 touchdowns. However, he received little attention as a college recruit due to having suffered a knee injury the year prior, which caused most schools to lose interest. He enrolled at Nassau Community College to play college football.

== College career ==
Collier saw limited playing time in his two seasons with Nassau, where he was a fourth-string running back. He totaled 78 rushing yards as a freshman in 2018 and 270 rushing yards with a touchdown in 2019; he also caught five receiving touchdowns in 2019. In 16 total games played for Nassau, he ran for 348 yards, had 184 receiving yards and scored six touchdowns.

Collier had an offer to continue his college football career with the NCAA Division I FCS Wagner Seahawks and transferred there in 2020. He ran for 83 yards in two games during the COVID-19-shortened spring 2021 season and ran for 168 yards in six games during the fall 2021 season. However, he battled concussions early during his time at Wagner, at one point having sustained three in a six-game span. He ran for 86 yards in three games during the 2022 season and then transferred to the NCAA Division II Lock Haven Bald Eagles for the 2023 season.

Collier had a breakout season with the Bald Eagles in 2023, playing 11 games while running for 1,393 yards and 12 touchdowns and recording 22 receptions for 238 yards and three touchdowns. He helped Lock Haven to its best season since 1982 and broke the school's all-time single-season rushing yards record, receiving numerous honors including being a nominee for the Harlon Hill Trophy as the best player in the NCAA Division II. He was a three-time conference player of the week and was named first-team All-Pennsylvania State Athletic Conference (PSAC), first-team Division II All-American, D2CCA second-team All-Region, to the DII Elite 100 team and was named the PSAC Offensive Player of the Year.

== Professional career ==
Pre-draft measurables
Height	Weight	Arm length	Hand span	Wingspan	40-yard dash	10-yard split	20-yard split	20-yard shuttle	Three-cone drill	Vertical jump	Broad jump	Bench press
5 ft 10 7/8 in (1.80 m)	203 lb (92 kg)	32 3/8 in (0.82 m)	9 1/4 in (0.23 m)	6 ft 5 1/4 in (1.96 m)	4.48 s	1.50 s	2.50 s	4.20 s	6.78 s	36.5 in (0.93 m)	10 ft 9 in (3.28 m)	21 reps
All values from Pro Day

=== Baltimore Ravens ===
Collier impressed at his pro day, with a 4.48-second 40-yard dash and a 6.78 three-cone drill, each being better than any running back at the NFL Scouting Combine. After going unselected in the 2024 NFL draft, he signed with the Baltimore Ravens as an undrafted free agent, being given a three-year, $2.8 million contract. In preseason, he saw action as a running back and kick returner, recording 28 rushes for 104 yards and two receptions. He was waived by the Ravens on August 27, 2024, and re-signed to the practice squad the following day. He was elevated to the active roster for the team's Week 3 game against the Dallas Cowboys and made his NFL debut in the 28–25 win, appearing on one special teams snap. He became only the third Lock Haven alumni ever to play in the NFL, as well as the first since 1987. Collier was elevated a second time for Week 4 and a third time for Week 5. He saw no action in Week 4 against the Buffalo Bills, but then appeared on 11 special teams snaps in Week 5 against the Cincinnati Bengals and returned two kickoffs for 22 yards.

=== Las Vegas Raiders ===
On November 20, 2024, Collier signed with the Las Vegas Raiders' practice squad. He was promoted to the active roster on December 18.

On August 26, 2025, Collier was waived by the Raiders as part of final roster cuts and re-signed to the practice squad the next day. He signed a reserve/future contract with Las Vegas on January 5, 2026.

On July 31, 2026, Collier was waived by the Raiders with an injury designation and reverted to injured reserve. On November 13, he was waived.
