= Jerry Recco =

American sports radio personality (born 1974)

Jerry Recco (born March 19, 1974) is an American sports radio personality, serving as a morning anchor on Boomer and Gio program on sports radio station WFAN in New York City. He has been with the station since 1997. As of 2009, Recco also reports sports in the morning for WFAN's sister station all-news WINS. Born in Brooklyn and raised in New Jersey, Recco received a BA in Media Arts from Jersey City State College, after a 3-year stint at the now defunct Upsala College. He began his career at WFAN first as an intern and then moved up to producer and board operator, before taking over as the overnight anchor. He left WFAN for a short time to disc jockey at WHTG-FM in New Jersey and anchor sports at Sportsphone before returning in April 2000 as part-time anchor and full-time board operator for the Mike and the Mad Dog show. Recco is an avid golfer and Dallas Cowboys fan.

Recco played baseball at St. John Vianney High School.

Since 2006, Recco has been the radio play-by-play voice of Columbia Lions football and basketball. Their games are streamed on the Columbia University Athletics website. On October 6, 2016, Recco was named the play-by-play announcer for the Rutgers University Men's Basketball team.

Recco also spent time covering the New York Giants in 2004 and the covering the New York Jets in 2007 and 2008. He is also the station's key Super Bowl reporter, having covered the last four. Recco currently serves as the studio host for Compass Media Networks' presentation of the Dallas Cowboys. In addition, he co-hosts the Al & Jerry's Postgame Podcast with Al Dukes.

Recco, his wife Kim, and his sons Matthew and Joseph currently reside in Hazlet, New Jersey.
