= Boomer and Gio =

American morning drive sports radio show

- Other names: Boomer and Carton (2007–2017); The Morning Show with Boomer (2017)
- Genre: Sports talk
- Running time: 4 hours (6:00–10:00 a.m. ET)
- Country of origin: United States
- Language: English
- Home station: WFAN AM/FM (2007–present)
- TV adaptations: MSG Network (2010–2013); CBS Sports Network (2014–present)
- Starring: Boomer Esiason (2007–present); Craig Carton (2007–2017); Gregg Giannotti (2018–present)
- Produced by: Eddie Scozzare (2007-present)
- Executive producer: Al Dukes (2007-present)
- Recording studio: 345 Hudson Street, Manhattan, New York, New York
- Original release: September 4, 2007
- Website: Boomer and Gio

Boomer and Gio (previously Boomer and Carton from 2007–2017 and The Morning Show with Boomer in 2017) is a morning drive sports radio program on WFAN-AM and WFAN-FM in New York City. It is hosted by former National Football League player Boomer Esiason and radio personality Gregg Giannotti.

The show originated in 2007 as a replacement for Don Imus's morning program after he was fired by CBS Radio. It debuted on September 4, 2007, with Esiason and radio veteran Craig Carton (formerly of The Jersey Guys) as the original hosts. During its 10-year run, Boomer and Carton garnered strong ratings, placing first among men ages 25–54. In September 2017, Carton left the program after his arrest and subsequent charges for securities and wire fraud resulting from a ticket Ponzi scheme. The show was temporarily rebranded around Esiason while he served as the sole host. Giannotti took over as co-host in January 2018, and the program was renamed Boomer and Gio.

The show was simulcast on MSG Network from September 14, 2010 through September 13, 2013, and began airing on CBS Sports Network on January 6, 2014.

== History ==
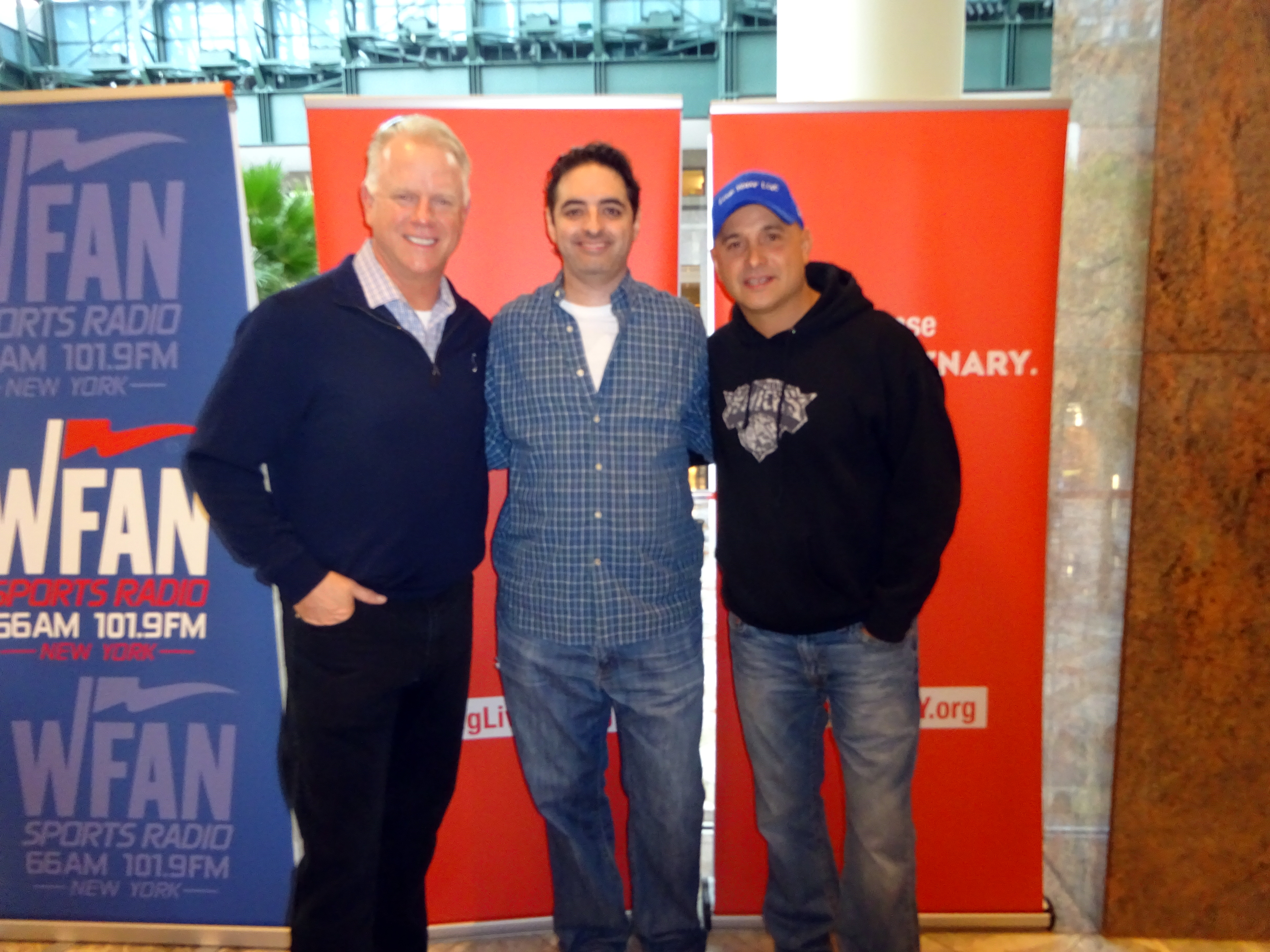
Esiason (left) and Carton (right), the program's original hosts in 2016.

In the wake of shock jock Don Imus's controversial comments in early 2007, CBS Radio fired the long-time radio personality. From then on, various hosts filled the 6:00 to 10:00 a.m. time slot left by the Imus firing. Charles McCord and Chris Carlin remained on all the replacement shows as assistance and staff, in similar roles as they had on Imus's show, and the replacement shows continued to be syndicated via Westwood One. Mike Francesa and Chris Russo were the first to fill the spot, hosting for the two weeks (April 16–27) immediately after Imus's firing. Francesa and Russo also worked the shift separate from each other, as did fellow WFAN staffers Richard Neer, Joe Benigno and Evan Roberts, and Carlin, who worked both alone and with co-hosts, notably Kim Jones and Washington Post sports columnist John Feinstein.

WFAN and Westwood One also brought in outside personalities for the slot; among them were Boomer Esiason, David Gregory, Patrick McEnroe, Geraldo Rivera, Lou Dobbs, and Chicago sports radio host Mike North.

On September 4, 2007, Esiason took over as the permanent host of the WFAN morning show, with veteran radio personality Craig Carton serving as co-host. This began a 10-year run for the duo hosting the show, which was dubbed Boomer and Carton. The new program was not distributed nationally by Westwood One. During the 2009 spring and summer ratings periods, the program finished in first place among men ages 25–54.

A television simulcast debuted on MSG Network on September 14, 2010, giving the show more exposure in upstate New York. On December 2, 2013, CBS announced that it would present the show on CBS Sports Network beginning in January 2014.

=== Carton's 2017 arrest and resignation from show ===
On September 6, 2017, Carton was arrested by federal agents at his home in New York City on criminal charges of securities fraud, wire fraud, and conspiracy to commit those offenses. Carton and two associates are alleged to have run a Ponzi scheme that defrauded $5.6 million from investors by falsely claiming they had access to millions of dollars of concert tickets at face value through non-existent agreements with concert promoters. Carton allegedly used the funds from new investors to cover millions of dollars of gambling debts and to repay earlier investors.

On September 13, 2017, Carton submitted a resignation letter to CBS Radio, ending his run on the program. Carton said he wished to give his former show "the best opportunity to succeed without further disruption." CBS announced it would look to hire a replacement host. Overnight before the September 14 program, WFAN rebranded the show under a new title, The Morning Show with Boomer, and had its set designers remove any mention of Carton from the set. The show's jingles were re-recorded in the week prior to only refer to Esiason under the show's new title.

=== Gregg Giannotti named as Carton's replacement ===
After Carton's resignation, Jerry Recco filled in as co-host on most days. On November 15, 2017, WFAN announced Gregg Giannotti as the new permanent co-host. Giannotti is a former WFAN producer who later hosted morning radio programs for KDKA-FM in Pittsburgh and, subsequently, the Gio and Jones morning show for CBS Sports Radio.

On January 2, 2018, Boomer and Gio officially began. In May 2021, WFAN extended the contracts for Esiason and Giannotti through 2023 as the program remained among the market leaders.

== On-air ==
=== Carton's walk across the Brooklyn Bridge in a Speedo ===
To New York, the greatest city in the world where a man shows what he's got for the New York Giants.

— Craig Carton

On January 18, 2008, Carton honored a wager by walking across the Brooklyn Bridge holding a sign reading "Any Given Sunday" and wearing only a Speedo and New York Giants All-Pro tight end Jeremy Shockey jersey. After a week of berating the local team, Carton guaranteed the Giants would lose to the despised division rival Dallas Cowboys. The following Sunday the Giants upset the Cowboys, 21–17.

After the stunt, Carton quipped, "It's an experience I will never do again".

On January 8, 2010, Carton repeated the stunt this time in the colors of the New York Jets, following Carton's earlier claim that the Jets would not make the playoffs. This stunt meant a lot more for Carton as he is a long-time Jets fan.

=== Brett the Jet ===
Really, for somebody to do that with a bullhorn, No. 1, you're not a Jets fan and you're not interested in the team. You're interested in yourself and bringing light to yourself. So, as players, we would laugh at it. We consider Carton annoying and unfunny, while Boomer is a traitor.

— Chad Pennington

On July 30, 2008, at 1 pm, Carton went to the NY Jets training camp at Hofstra University in Uniondale, Long Island. Carton brought a megaphone and rallied a group of a few hundred Jets fans cheering "Let's Get Brett." The chant was a response to speculation that Green Bay Packers QB Brett Favre was looking to be traded upon coming out of a brief retirement. Carton had reasoned with the Jets organization over the air to put out a statement that the Jets were not pursuing Favre, if that was the case. If the Jets made this statement, he agreed to not show up at camp—but the Jets organization never came forward. Carton was chastised by the local media for this "stunt" and many local reporters felt the Jets stood no chance of getting Favre. On August 7, 2008, the Jets acquired Favre for a conditional fourth-round draft pick.

=== Controversies ===
On April 1, 2014, Boomer and Carton were discussing Mets second baseman Daniel Murphy taking paternity leave in order to be with his wife for the birth of his first child, and that Murphy would be unable to attend opening day. Boomer Esiason was critical of Murphy, saying his wife should have scheduled "a C-section before the season starts" because he "needs to be at Opening Day." After receiving criticism from groups like the March of Dimes and many of the program's listeners, Esiason later apologized to Murphy and his wife for "creating an intrusion into a very sacred and personal moment in their lives" and for making an "insensitive remark that I sincerely regret." Carton, consistent with his character, remained indifferent, referring to those who opposed them as "knuckleheads."
