= Mark D. Benigni =

American politician

Mayor of Meriden, Connecticut
- In office 2001–2008

Personal details
- Born: Mark David Benigni; 1972 (age 53–54)
- Party: Independent
- Education: Western Connecticut State University (B.A.); University of Hartford (M.A.), (EdD)
- Profession: Educator

Mark David Benigni (born 1972) is an American education professional and former politician. From 2001 to 2008, Benigni served as mayor of Meriden, Connecticut. Formerly a member of the Meriden City Council, Benigni was elected as an independent candidate in 2001.

Benigni is currently Superintendent of Meriden Public Schools, having served in the position since 2010. He previously serving as principal of Cromwell High School from 2008 to 2010.

== Early life and education ==
Benigni was described as a "lifelong [Meriden] resident" by The New York Times in 2001. He earned a bachelor's degree in business from Western Connecticut State University. He received his master's and doctorate degrees in education from the University of Hartford.

== Career ==
Benigni was an assistant principal in the Berlin, Connecticut school district before getting elected to the Meriden City Council. In 2001, he was elected to his first term as mayor of Meriden. A former Democrat, he ran as an independent candidate against incumbent Democratic mayor Joseph J. Marinan Jr. His 2001 mayoral candidacy was supported by local Republicans.

His victory made Meriden the only municipality in Connecticut at the time to have a mayor without a partisan affiliation. He went on to serve four terms in office. In 2008, Benigni resigned as mayor to became the principal of Cromwell High School.

He left his position as principal in 2010 to become Superintendent of Meriden Public Schools. As Superintendent, he has been credited with instituting full-day kindergarten programs in the district, as well as Saturday enrichment education services. In 2024, he presided over the expansion of English as a second language programs in the district to meet demand among new students.
