= Benignus of Todi =

Saint Benignus

Martyr
- Died: 303; Todi, Umbria, Italy
- Venerated in: Roman Catholic Church Eastern Orthodox Church
- Canonized: Pre-Congregation
- Feast: 13 February

Benignus was a martyr at Todi, Umbria, in 303, under the persecution of Diocletian.

Benignus is one of the 140 Colonnade saints which adorn St. Peter's Square.
