= Craig Carton =

American radio personality (born 1969)

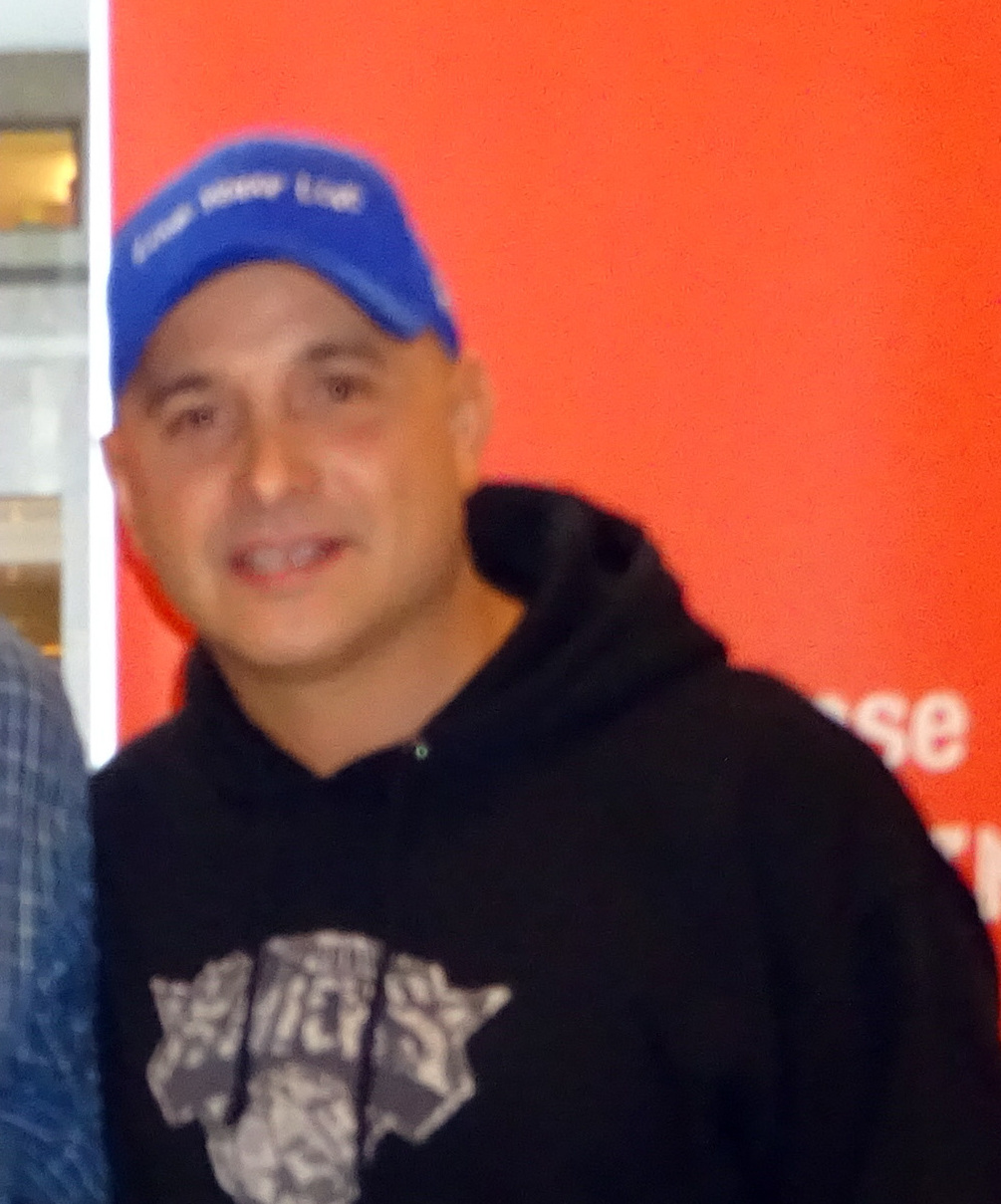
- Carton in 2016
- Born: Craig Harris Carton; January 31, 1969 (age 57); New Rochelle, New York, U.S.
- Presenting career
- Show: The Carton Show with Chris McMonigle; The Joint Venture Show
- Stations: WFAN and WFAN-FM, New York City
- Time slot: 2:00 PM-6:00 PM Eastern Time
- Style: Sports radio
- Previous shows: Boomer and Carton; The Jersey Guys; Sports Guys

Craig Harris Carton (born January 31, 1969) is an American radio and television personality who has gained national recognition as one of the most prominent sports broadcasters of his generation. Known for his outspoken and energetic on-air style, Carton has worked nationally across radio and television.

Carton is currently the co-host of The Carton Show with Chris McMonigle and hosts The Joint Venture Show with rapper Lil Wayne. He previously co-hosted the Carton and Roberts sports radio program on WFAN in New York City and appeared nationally on Fox Sports 1 as the weekday morning host of Breakfast Ball.

From 2007 to 2017, Carton co-hosted Boomer and Carton with Boomer Esiason on WFAN. The program was later simulcast nationally on CBS Sports Network. During its 10-year run, Boomer and Carton became the most listened to show in WFAN history, placing first among men ages 25–54.

In September 2017, Carton resigned from the program and WFAN after his arrest for securities and wire fraud. He was sentenced to three and a half years in prison, and after serving 12 months, he was released to home confinement in 2020 and completed his sentence in 2021. He satisfied his 3 years of court ordered probation in June 2024.

Four months after his release from prison in 2020, he was rehired by WFAN, for which he hosted the number-one rated afternoon-drive program with Evan Roberts. Carton became only the second broadcaster to ever host the number-one show in both morning and afternoon drive, after Howard Stern. Carton also hosts a podcast and public service show called Hello, My Name Is Craig dedicated to helping listeners with gambling addiction and other issues. Carton was inducted into the New York State Broadcasters Association's Hall of Fame in October 2024. In January 2026, Carton began his third stint at WFAN, hosting The Carton Show with Chris McMonigle in the afternoon drive slot, together with Chris McMonigle, former overnight host on WFAN. Most recently Carton and rapper Lil Wayne announced a new podcast The Joint Venture Show.

== Early and personal life ==
Craig Harris Carton was born on January 31, 1969, in New Rochelle, New York. In March 2019, Carton revealed that he was a victim of child sexual abuse while at a summer camp. He graduated from New Rochelle High School and the S. I. Newhouse School of Public Communications at Syracuse University with a degree in broadcast journalism in 1991.

While in high school, Carton performed play-by-play duties for a variety of Westchester County high-school sporting events and was enrolled in a sports broadcasting class taught by legendary announcer Bob Wolff. As a college student, he worked as a DJ at several Syracuse nightclubs.

In his 30s, Carton was diagnosed with Tourette syndrome.

Carton's first book, Loudmouth: Tales (and Fantasies) of Sports, Sex, and Salvation from Behind the Microphone, was released on June 4, 2013.

Carton launched the Tic Toc Stop Foundation in 2013, which raises funds to combat Tourette syndrome and provide a camp for youths with Tourette named Camp Carton. Fundraising has included an annual golf tournament and a bowling event known as "Strike Out Tourettes [sic]."

== Career ==
Carton began his broadcasting career in 1991 at WGR Radio in Buffalo. He went on to work at WWWE in Cleveland in 1992 and WIP in Philadelphia in April 1993. On WIP, Carton was a brash weekend host nicknamed "The Kid" and filled in on the station's morning-drive show.

Carton left the East Coast for Denver, working mostly at KKFN 950 AM, "The Fan." His morning show took off immediately and he became the highest-rated host in the station's history. He next took the morning slot on KBPI, where he hosted the market's top-rated local morning show. Carton left Denver to care for his wife Kim, who was pregnant with their first child.

In late 2000, Carton replaced Scott Kaplan on WNEW-FM's Sports Guys morning radio program in New York City, a job that he held for one year. He took the show in a new direction, adding stunts such as an on-the-air cockfight and "Pastapalooza." Carton was broadcasting live with Blain Ensley on WNEW during the September 11, 2001 attacks.

In July 2002, Carton began co-hosting The Jersey Guys show on WKXW. The show was nominated for a Marconi Award as the top mid-market talk show in the country.

Carton left WKXW in August 2007 for a morning opening at New York's WFAN as Boomer Esiason's co-host, replacing Imus in the Morning. The Boomer and Carton show reached number one (men 25–54) in the Arbitron ratings within a year, a ranking that Imus had not achieved since 1993. The show was simulcast on MSG Network from 2010 to 2013 and also on the CBS Sports Network starting in 2014. Boomer and Carton became the top-ranked show in New York, was nominated for multiple Marconi Awards and won several Cynopsis Media awards as the nation's top major-market sports-talk show.

In 2012, Carton hosted Spike's MMA Uncensored Live. Carton and Esiason announced a 2013 NBA game between the Brooklyn Nets and the Washington Wizards.

=== The Joint Venture Show ===
In July 2026, Carton began co-hosting The Joint Venture Show, a weekly sports and entertainment video podcast, with rapper Lil Wayne. The program is produced by Magilla Entertainment and distributed through YouTube, Apple Podcasts, Spotify, Amazon Music and iHeartRadio. The first episode, recorded before a live audience at Fanatics Fest NYC, featured Eli Manning, Darrelle Revis and Amar'e Stoudemire.

The podcast's second episode, featuring former National Football League (NFL) wide receiver Plaxico Burress and comedian Matt Friend, received widespread media attention after a clip of Burress discussing his season with the New York Jets circulated online. In the interview, Lil Wayne asked Burress whether playing for the Jets or serving time in prison had been worse. Burress described the experiences as "kind of similar", saying that both made him feel like a "loser". His remarks were reported by national publications including Sports Illustrated, NBC Sports, Fox News and the New York Post.

=== Arrest and conviction ===
On September 6, 2017, Carton was arrested by federal agents at his home in New York City on criminal charges of securities fraud, wire fraud and conspiracy to commit those offenses. Carton, Michael Wright, Dean Heiser and Joseph Meli were alleged to have defrauded $4.8 million from investors by falsely claiming that the group had access to millions of dollars of face-value concert tickets through nonexistent agreements with concert promoters. Although Carton proved in court via witness testimony and the Government also confirmed that he had bought the tickets in question, a parallel civil complaint filed by the U.S. Securities and Exchange Commission alleged that Carton used some of the funds from a ticket investor for gambling and only purchased the tickets at a later date. Trial testimony further proved that Carton had no existing gambling debt at the time when the alleged fraud was perpetrated. The question became whether his credit-card purchase of the tickets five weeks after he had allegedly misappropriated the funds that he had received for ticket purchases constituted fraud. Carton's lawyers argued that money is fungible and, as such, the manner in which Carton had purchased the tickets was not significant as long as he actually purchased them as he claimed. The jury accepted the government's version of events, and based on the evidence found Carton guilty.

After receiving an indefinite suspension from WFAN, Carton resigned from the station on September 13, 2017, ending his ten-year stint as co-host of Boomer and Carton and leaving Esiason as the sole host. Carton made the decision to give his former show "the best opportunity to succeed without further disruption." On March 29, 2018, Carton returned to radio as host of Carton & Friends on FNTSY Sports Network. In May 2018, Sports Byline USA acquired rights to syndicate the program on terrestrial radio.

Carton was convicted of fraud on November 7, 2018, in Manhattan federal court after a week-long trial. Sentencing was scheduled for February 27, 2019, before being delayed until March 15. Carton was sentenced on April 5 to three and a half years in prison and ordered to make restitution of $4.8 million. He reported to the United States Penitentiary, Lewisburg minimum-security satellite camp on June 17, 2019, to begin serving a minimum of 36 months of a maximum 42-month sentence.

Carton was released from prison to a halfway house on June 23, 2020, and ultimately to home confinement. While in federal prison, he completed a 500-hour cognitive behavioral therapy course that made him eligible for release.

=== Return to WFAN ===
On October 29, 2020, it was announced that Carton would return to WFAN, hosting the afternoon drive Carton & Roberts with Evan Roberts (replacing the retiring Joe Benigno) beginning November 9. On December 10, 2020, it was also announced that Carton would host a weekly program airing Saturday mornings beginning January 9 called Hello, My Name Is Craig on which he would discuss problem gambling.

In its first full ratings-book period, the new show was the highest-rated afternoon-drive sports-talk show in New York City.

In September 2022, Carton began hosting The Carton Show on weekday mornings for Fox Sports 1, while continuing to co-host his afternoon show with Roberts on WFAN. In June 2023, Carton announced his departure from WFAN, effective June 30, to focus on his new Fox Sports 1 morning show. The Craig Carton Show on Fox Sports 1 was cancelled in 2024. Carton moved onto a new morning show at the network, Breakfast Ball, along with Mark Schlereth and Danny Parkins, which was subsequently canceled in 2025. Carton returned to WFAN and began hosting The Carton Show with Chris McMonigle in the afternoons on January 5, 2026.

== Awards and honors ==
Audacy has described Carton as a nominee and finalist for multiple NAB Marconi Radio Awards, although its published biography does not identify every year and category.

Won, selected, honored or inducted	Nominated, finalist, honorable mention or ranking

Year	Organization	Award or recognition	Recipient or work	Result	Ref.
1990s	Philadelphia	Top 30 Under 30	Craig Carton	Selected	
2006	New Jersey Monthly	Best of New Jersey—Best Shock Jocks	The Jersey Guys with Ray Rossi	Named	
2006	Radio & Records	Talk Show Host of the Year	Craig Carton	Nominated	
2007	PoliticsNJ.com	Most politically influential personalities in New Jersey	Craig Carton	Ranked ninth	
2008–2010	WFAN	Pulse of the People Award	Craig Carton	Won three consecutive times	
2011	New Rochelle Fund for Educational Excellence	Achievement Award—Annual Awards Gala honoree	Craig Carton	Honored	
Year not stated	NAB Marconi Radio Awards	Additional Marconi finalist placement or placements	Craig Carton	Finalist	
Various	Talkers Magazine	Top 100 Most Important and Influential Talk Show Hosts	Craig Carton	Ranked second among sports-talk hosts	
2013	NAB Marconi Radio Awards	Major Market Personality of the Year	Boomer and Carton	Finalist	
2013	Cynopsis Media	Cynopsis Sports Media Award—Radio Program	Boomer and Carton	Won	
2013	WFAN	Pulse of the People Award	Craig Carton	Won—fourth win	
2014	Cynopsis Media	Cynopsis Sports Media Award—Radio Program	Boomer and Carton	Won	
2014	WFAN	Pulse of the People Award	Craig Carton	Won—fifth win	
2015	Cynopsis Media	Cynopsis Sports Media Award—Radio Program	Boomer and Carton	Won	
2016	Cynopsis Media	Cynopsis Sports Media Award—Radio Program	Boomer and Carton	Honorable mention	
2016	WFAN	Pulse of the People Award	Craig Carton	Won—sixth win	
2017	Cynopsis Media	Cynopsis Sports Media Award—Radio Program	Boomer and Carton	Won	
2024	New York State Broadcasters Association	New York State Broadcasters Hall of Fame	Craig Carton	Inducted	
2026	New Rochelle High School	Distinguished Alumni Hall of Fame	Craig Carton	Inducted	

== Controversy and stunts ==
=== 610-WIP ===
On February 28, 1997, Carton reported that Philadelphia Flyers captain Eric Lindros had missed a game against the Pittsburgh Penguins on February 15 because he was hung over. Carton claimed that the Flyers' reason (a sore back) for Lindros missing the game was a cover-up. The Flyers immediately sued WIP, resulting in an out-of-court settlement. Two years later, Flyers ownership admitted that the allegation was actually true.

=== WFAN ===
On January 18, 2008, Carton walked the Brooklyn Bridge holding a sign reading "Any Given Sunday" and wearing only a Speedo and a New York Giants tight end Jeremy Shockey jersey after betting that the New York Giants would lose to the Dallas Cowboys in the 2008 NFL playoffs. He duplicated the stunt on January 8, 2010, after betting that the New York Jets would miss the playoffs.

=== Criticism of Steve Kerr ===
On April 24, 2025, Carton posted a tweet on X (formerly Twitter) that was highly critical of Golden State Warriors head coach Steve Kerr, stating that Kerr "seemingly supports" antisemitic incidents at Harvard University due to Kerr's support of Harvard pushing back against U.S. president Donald Trump's demands.
