= Jean Scott (author) =

Jean Scott, born Merla McCormick in 1938, is a retired teacher, an advantage player/comp hustler, and a gambling author who is best known for her 1998 book The Frugal Gambler. The book features gambling advice for novice gamblers, including money management strategies and how to procure the best casino comps and discounts.

Scott was featured on 48 Hours as a successful video poker player in 1995, which showed her winning a Mercury Mystique car in a raffle. She has claimed to win over a million dollars at casino gambling as of 2006.

Scott published a sequel to her first book, More Frugal Gambling in 2003. This book gives more details to help all levels of gamblers to lose less/win more. She went on to publish three more books in her Frugal Gambling series: Tax Help for Gamblers; Frugal Video Poker, a step-by-step guide to becoming a skilled VP player; and The Frugal Gambler Casino Guide (2017), which updates the information in the previous books to help gamblers adjust to the changing casino environment.

Scott allowed the Las Vegas Review-Journal to shadow her and her husband, to shed light upon the casino lifestyle of Stephen Paddock, the American high-limit gambler, fellow advantage player/comp hustler, and mass murderer responsible for the 2017 Las Vegas shooting. Scott was also profiled by her granddaughter Kaity Howard in a documentary Merla & Jean about the dual identities involved in being a public advantage gambler, which revealed her birth name to the public.
