= Joe & Evan =

- Starring: Joe Benigno; Evan Roberts
- Country of origin: United States

Production
- Running time: 4 hours

Original release
- Network: WFAN
- Release: January 2, 2007 – November 9, 2020
- Release: September 10, 2022 – present

Related
- Carton & Roberts

Joe & Evan is a sports talk radio show hosted by Joe Benigno and Evan Roberts, originally broadcast on weekday afternoons from 2 p.m. to 6 p.m. ET on New York radio stations WFAN-AM and WFAN-FM. Originally the midday hosts, Joe & Evan were promoted to "afternoon drive" replacing longtime host Mike Francesa who semi-retired in December 2019.

On October 29, 2020, after Benigno announced his retirement from WFAN, it was announced that Craig Carton, who is returning to the station after a three-year hiatus, would be succeeding Benigno and the afternoon show would be renamed Carton & Roberts starting November 9.

On August 5, 2022, it was announced that Joe & Evan would be returning as a Saturday morning show on September 10, with Benigno hosting the shows alone or alongside Roberts on a week-by-week basis.

== History ==
Longtime WFAN overnight host Joe Benigno originally began hosting the midday show on WFAN in 2004 with then co-host Sid Rosenberg. After Rosenberg was let go by the station in September 2005, Benigno would go on to host the midday show solo for a year until Evan Roberts joined him on January 2, 2007 creating the Joe & Evan show.

Joe & Evan became the highest-rated and longest-tenured midday hosts in WFAN history, receiving their first theme song in 2014.

After Mike Francesa's initial departure on December 15, 2017, the Joe & Evan show was extended to a 4-hour format 10 a.m. to 2 p.m. ET.

On May 1, 2018, the Joe & Evan show was returned to its three-hour format from 10 a.m. to 1 p.m. ET to accommodate the return of Mike Francesa to WFAN.

On December 30, 2019, Joe & Evan announced on-air their show will move to "afternoon drive" form 2 pm to 6 pm ET beginning January 2, 2020, replacing longtime host Mike Francesa.

On October 28, Benigno announced his retirement from WFAN, which was previously reported several days prior. It was announced the next day that a returning Craig Carton would be succeeding Benigno.

Benigno's final episode aired on November 9, with various guest appearances such as Marv Albert, Rich Eisen, Bobby Valentine, Terry Bradshaw and several WFAN alumni such as Mike Francesa, Chris Russo, Sid Rosenberg and station manager Mark Chernoff.

On August 5, 2022, almost two years after announcing his retirement, Benigno announced he would be returning to WFAN for a Saturday morning show, with Roberts returning as co-host, thus rebooting Joe & Evan. Benigno also confirmed that he would also be the sole host on select Saturdays when Roberts is unavailable (similar to Roberts' solo weekend shows).

== Format ==
The program is a regular sports-talk show focused on the analysis of the sports week by the host followed by calls from listeners. The show is characterized also by guests and ticket giveaways for different sports games.
