= Evan Roberts (sportscaster) =

American sports radio personality (born 1983)

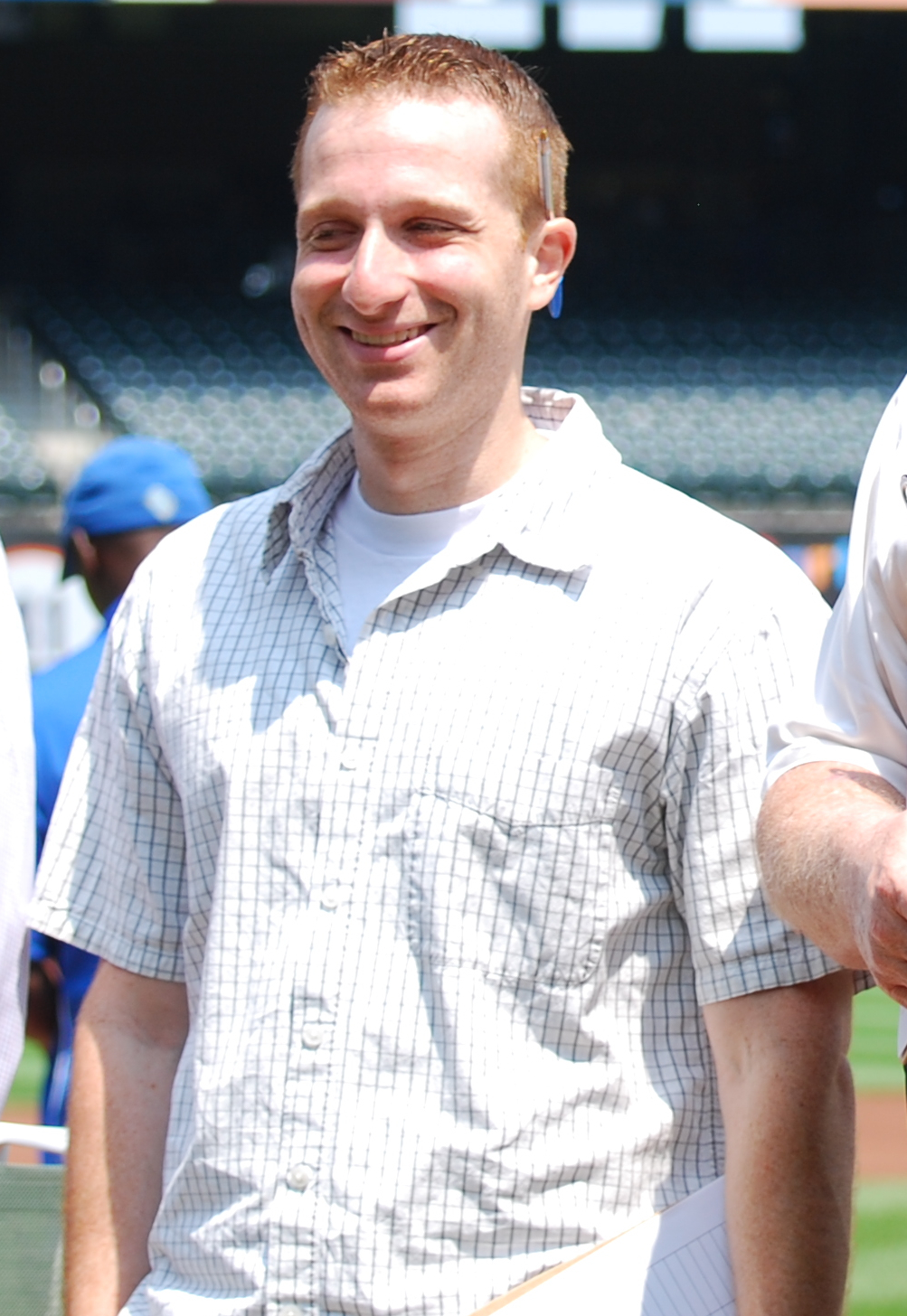
- Roberts at Citi Field, 2012
- Born: July 11, 1983 (age 43)
- Children: Jett Roberts and Spence Roberts
- Presenting career
- Show: Evan & Tiki; Joe & Evan (2007–2020); Carton and Roberts (2020–2023)
- Station: WFAN
- Network: WFAN (Audacy)
- Time slot: M-F 10:00 am - 02:00 pm ET
- Show: The Rico Brogna Podcast
- Style: Sports radio
- Country: United States

Evan Roberts (born July 11, 1983) is an American sports radio personality. He co-hosts the Evan and Tiki radio show, along with Tiki Barber, on the New York radio stations WFAN-AM and WFAN-FM.

== Biography ==
=== Early years ===
Roberts grew up in Woodmere, New York, graduating from Lawrence High School in 2001. He subsequently attended and graduated from Montgomery College while working at SiriusXM in Washington D.C.

Roberts' career began at the age of 15 when he had an opportunity to do updates for WFAN's Imus in the Morning radio program. He then hosted his own radio show, called Kidsports, on WGBB, and expanded it to a wider kids' audience with a show called Going Bzircus. A few years later, he hosted "What's Up With Evan Roberts" and "Nets Slammin' Planet" with Albert King and Brandon "Scoop B" Robinson for the now-defunct Radio AAHS (later AAHS World Radio) children's radio network. In 1996, Roberts played "Boy Dancing in Field with Father Lawrence" in the film Tromeo & Juliet. In 1997, Roberts played a role in the Howard Stern's movie autobiography Private Parts as Elliot.

=== Professional radio career ===
After graduating from high school he worked for XM Satellite Radio in Washington, D.C. for 2 years. In 2003 and 2004, he worked for WJFK in Baltimore, Maryland and then moved back to New York to host his own show on Maxim Radio, a channel on Sirius Satellite Radio.

In July 2004, Roberts was hired as an overnight host on WFAN.

On Jan. 2, 2007, Roberts moved from overnights to a midday show. He teamed up with Joe Benigno to cohost the “Benigno & Roberts in the Midday” show, which aired weekdays from 10 am to 1 pm on WFAN. This show lasted in that timeslot for 11 years. On January 2, 2018, with the initial departure of Mike Francesa from his 1 pm to 6:30 pm show, the Benigno and Roberts show was increased by 1 hour, airing on weekdays from 10 am to 2 pm.

On January 2, 2020, following a subsequent retirement by Francesa, the 13 year midday show got elevated to an afternoon program titled Joe & Evan, airing from 2 pm to 6:30 pm. This new afternoon show lasted until November 6, 2020, when Benigno retired from full time work, ending a 14-year partnership with Roberts.

On November 9, 2020, a new show hosted by Roberts and Craig Carton, Carton and Roberts, replaced Joe & Evan as the afternoon drive radio show, airing from 2 p.m. to 7 p.m.

In addition to his regular WFAN work, Roberts started The Evan Roberts Podcast, which focuses on his favorite teams (the New York Mets, the New York Jets, the Brooklyn Nets, and the New York Islanders) on Radio.com, on March 29, 2018, as well as a New York Mets-focused show called the Rico Brogna Podcast. Neither of these podcasts have regular schedules, with Roberts instead posting his instant opinions right after an exciting sporting event or after an interesting news story breaks outside of his normal show.

In April 2024, Roberts published the book My Mets Bible: Scoring 30 Years of Baseball Fandom, a personal and nostalgic chronicle of New York Mets fandom told through decades of his scorecards, memories, and unforgettable moments.

=== Personal life ===
Roberts is a fan of the New York Mets, Brooklyn Nets, New York Islanders, New York Jets, as well as WWE. He lives in Westchester County, New York with his wife, along with their sons Jett and Spence.

=== Book ===
Evan published a book titled My Mets Bible about his over 20 year history of scoring New York Mets baseball.
