= Rodolfo Benini =

- Born: 11 June 1862; Cremona, Italy
- Died: 12 February 1956 (aged 93); Rome, Italy
- Scientific career
- Fields: Statistics; Economics

Rodolfo Benini (11 June 1862 – 12 February 1956) was an Italian statistician and demographer.

== Biography ==
Benini was born in Cremona, Italy. At the beginning of his university career, Rodolfo Benini taught a history of commerce course at the University of Bari (1889–1895). Then he became a professor of economics at the University of Perugia (1896), a professor of statistics at the University of Pavia (1897–1907) and at the Bocconi University of Milan (1905–1909). Finally, he moved to the University of Rome, where he was the first professor of statistics (1908–1928) and then professor of political economy (1928–1935). Benini held various positions at the national and international levels, including president of the Higher Council of Statistics and of the Commission of Statistics and Law at the Ministry of Justice. He also represented the Italian Government at the Geneva Conference in 1921 and served as the president of the Commission of Statistics at the General Assembly for the World Agriculture Census in 1926.

Benini used economic and demographic empirical studies with the aim of constructing tools of general validity. In this context, we may include the study of the relations between the distribution of particular economic phenomena and the distribution of more general phenomena such as income or patrimony. His pioneering book Principles of Statistics (1906) contains his main contributions and successfully combines statistical methodology into a unified theory. In this way, Benini tried to give statistics an autonomous role in relation to economics, demography, and social sciences, with which it often became confused at the end of nineteenth and the beginning of the twentieth century. Among Benini's major original contributions we may mention, for example, the attraction indices, the extension to the patrimonies of the Paretian laws of income, and a probabilistic study of factors determining the proportion of the sexes in twins.

Benini was an Italian Academician (1932), an honorary member of ISTAT, a member of Istituto Veneto di Scienze Lettere ed Arti, and a member of the Italian Geographical Society. He died in Rome.

== Publications ==
A bibliography of Benini's publications lists 137 scientific works.

- La teoria dei prezzi e della circolazione monetaria(1888);
- Principî di demografia (1901);
- Principî di statistica metodologica (1905);
- Principles of Statistics (1906)
- Il campo normale di variabilità delle serie statistiche, (1908);
- Indagini di antropometria militare, (1897);
- Distribuzione probabile della ricchezza privata in Italia per classi di popolazione, (1894);
- Elementi di statistica metodologica demografica ed economica, Roma (1922);
- Le leggi statistiche e l'economia pura, Roma (1928);
- Lezioni di economia politica (1936);
- Dante tra gli splendori dei suoi enigmi risolti ed altri saggi,(1952).
