= Joe Benigno =

American sports radio personality

- Born: September 26, 1953 (age 73); Garfield, New Jersey, U.S.
- Presenting career
- Show: Oh the Pain
- Time slot: Weekly
- Style: Sports radio
- Country: United States
- Website: ohthepainpodcast.com

Joseph S. Benigno (born September 26, 1953) is an American sports radio personality who hosts the weekly sports podcast Oh the Pain. Previously, He was a co-host of the Joe & Evan show with Evan Roberts on New York sports radio station WFAN.

== Biography ==
=== Early years ===
Benigno, who is of Italian descent, was born in Garfield, New Jersey and grew up in nearby Paramus. He graduated from Franklin College in 1975 with a degree in political science. Prior to joining WFAN, Benigno was a frequent caller to the station and was known on-air as "Joe from Saddle River."

=== Professional radio career ===
His first taste of radio experience occurred in 1994, when he guest-hosted a show on WFAN as a result of winning a contest held by the station. He then hosted a sports talk show on a radio station in Elizabeth, New Jersey before returning to WFAN as their overnight host in 1995. He continued as overnight host until November 2004, when he was moved to middays to co-host with Sid Rosenberg after Rosenberg's previous co-host, Jody McDonald, did not have his contract renewed with the station. After Rosenberg resigned from the station on September 12, 2005, Benigno became the sole host of the midday show until January 2007, when he was paired with Evan Roberts.

Benigno also co-hosted Daily News Live on SNY.

Benigno was filling in for the vacationing Boomer and Carton in the Morning program on March 28, 2013 with his partner Roberts, when Benigno made disparaging remarks about having to get makeup done. (The program was simulcast on MSG.) Benigno said that he was annoyed about the chair time required for MSG's "11 viewers." The Benigno & Roberts show scheduled to be broadcast on Good Friday via MSG was immediately cancelled.

On April 25, 2013, Benigno faced criticism for jokingly saying he would "buy drugs for Tyrann Mathieu" if the New York Jets drafted him.

=== Personal life ===
Benigno released a book in April 2010, titled Rules for New York Sports Fans.

On July 18, 2018, a wide-ranging lawsuit was filed by former WFAN employee Lauren Lockwood against WFAN, WCBS, various WFAN executives, as well as Benigno, alleging, among other things, that "WFAN host Joe Benigno pressured her into having a threesome" and that Benigno "whispered in [Lockwood’s] ear about having ‘threesomes’ with him and his wife and prostitutes." Through his representative, Benigno denied the allegations. In response to the lawsuit, Benigno was placed on an indefinite leave of absence from the station, returning on a regular basis on September 10, 2018.

On October 28, 2020, Benigno announced that he would retire, with November 6, 2020 being his last show. Benigno would later return to the station on a limited basis in 2022, appearing on Monday mornings during the NFL season during WFAN's mid-day show, as well as hosting a Saturday morning show.

Benigno resides in Mahwah, New Jersey.
