= Pearl White (organist) =

American musician (1910–1978)

Pearl White was an American silent-era theatre organist and piano player who worked in the Chicago area.

== Biography ==
She was born Pearl Eleanor Weiss on October 26, 1910, and at age three, was recognized as a child prodigy on the keyboard. At age four, she sang, danced and played concert grand at Chicago's Majestic (Shubert) Theatre. As a child, she studied piano with Rudolph Gantz and Florence LeClare.

At age eleven she studied with Robert Bing at Glen Dillard Gunn School in Chicago's Fine Arts Building and Jessica Wiley at the Bush Conservatory of Music on the North Side. Her early studies on organ were with Edward Benedict in the Kimball building and Dean Fossler at the Gunn School.

Miss White first played organ professionally at age 13 at the Virginia Theatre and later at the Echo Theater in Des Plaines. Al Carny, organist for station WCFL, recommended her for her next position—cutting master piano rolls in Chicago for the Capitol Music Roll Company. From 1925 to 1932, White cut more than 100 rolls (sample roll on YouTube) which appeared on labels such as Capitol, Imperial, Supertone, American and Columbia. As the Capitol company also made rolls for many coin-operated nickelodeon and orchestrion type instruments, many of her performance also survive in this format, with added orchestration from instruments built into these coin-operated instruments (such as drums, pipes, etc.) She also worked as substitute organist at the Uptown, Tivoli, Granada, Belmont and Embassy Theatres around this time.

White played the North Center Theatre from 1928 to 1932 and also had a six-week run at the Chicago Theatre.

As the need for organists in theaters diminished with the arrival of sound pictures, Pearl White began to perform on radio, first appearing on WBBM in 1929. In 1944 she joined the full-time staff of WIND providing background music and was also heard on WCFL. She was also considered to be an accomplished musical arranger and provided arrangements to the Phil Harris orchestra among others. The hallmark of her hard-driving jazz style is interlocking chords alternating between the right and left hands which she dubbed "double stuff".

White enjoyed a renaissance late in her career when theatre organs were removed from failing, aged theatres and installed in alternate venues. She performed with Al Melgard at Chicago Stadium on the giant Barton organ in 1962 and was featured artist at the 1964 American Theatre Organ Society's Convention on YouTube in Shea's Theatre in Buffalo. She also played for the Chicago Area Organ Enthusiasts' conventions of 1965 and 1969 and provided organ accompaniment at silent film revival showings and made guest appearances at the Elm Skating Rink.

Despite a long and successful musical career, Pearl White made only one commercial recording showcasing the blazingly fast jazz technique for which she earned the nickname, "The Fireball". Entitled "Pearl White in Nostalgia and Flame", it was made at the Patio Theatre in Chicago in 1968 on her own label.

Pearl White died on May 11, 1978. She was inducted into the American Theatre Organ Society Hall of Fame in 1991.

== Additional sources ==
September, 1971 personal interview of Pearl White by Rodney Elliot published as supplement #6 to the Chicago Area Theatre Organ Enthusiast's newsletter, VOX. Jacket notes from LP "Pearl White in Nostalgia and Flame" released 1968 on Pearl White Recordings Label. Theatre Organ Magazine June/July 1978 pp49
