= Walt Strony =

- Born: 1955 (age 70–71); Chicago, Illinois, U.S.
- Genres: theatre organ silent film music classical music
- Occupation: organist
- Instrument: pipe organ
- Years active: 1974–present
- Website: http://www.waltstrony.com

Walt Strony (born 1955) is an American recording, consulting and performing organist and organ teacher, both on the theatre organ and traditional pipe organ, ranging from pizza parlors to churches and theatres to symphony orchestras.

== Biography ==
Strony’s classical organ studies were with Herbert L. White of the Sherwood Conservatory of Music Columbia College Chicago and Karel Paukert at Northwestern University. His theatre organ teacher was Al Melgard, famous as the Staff Organist on the Barton organ at the Chicago Stadium. When Melgard retired in 1975 he gave Strony his Oak Park, IL teaching studio. Strony later studied piano with Giulio Favrio of the Lyric Opera of Chicago.

He made his public debut as an organist in 1974, aged 18. During his college years he began playing the theatre organ in pizza parlors, a fad in the 1970s which gave new life to a largely forgotten instrument. For many years thereafter he was Artist-in-Residence at First Christian Church in Las Vegas, Nevada.

Strony has studied with silent-film accompanists and has accompanied silent films for years, such as The Phantom of the Opera (1925 film) and Nosferatu at the Plaza Theatre (El Paso).

== Performances ==
He has performed in the United States, toured extensively in Australia (1978), England (1989), Japan (Expo ‘75 & 2011), and Canada (1999), and he is a regular performer at conventions of the American Theatre Organ Society. In 2012 he played his 39th ATOS convention, more than any other organist. He played there again in 2008. He has also performed for the American Guild of Organists on both local and national levels.

He has performed on numerous classical instruments as well, most notably having been featured in June 2009 at Macy's in Philadelphia (formerly Wanamaker’s) playing the largest operating pipe organ in the world. He has also recorded on the world’s largest theatre organ at the Sanfillipo Music Room in Barrington, IL.

In addition to solo concerts, he has performed with several symphony orchestras. In El Paso he played music including Symphony No. 3 (Organ) of Camille Saint-Saëns. He played at the Calgary International Organ Festival with the Calgary Philharmonic. Additionally, he has performed with the Allentown Symphony and Symphony Silicon Valley. While in college he performed the Poulenc Organ Concerto with the Chicago Businessman’s Orchestra.

== Awards ==
In 1991 and 1993 the American Theatre Organ Society selected him as "Organist of the Year." He is the only living organist to have received this award twice. In 2011 he was inducted into the American Theatre Organ Society Hall of Fame.

In the spring of 2008, and in celebration of his career, the Allen Organ Company developed the Walt Strony Signature Model - the STR-4 - which is a four-manual instrument. Strony designed the stoplist and chose all the samples from their extensive library based upon his experience as an organist and tonal consultant.

== Other work ==
His book The Secrets of Theatre Organ Registration (1991) was the first book to be written about this subject. According to the New York Times, this is "what many theater organists consider the definitive guide" to Wurlitzers. TheatreOrgans.com calls it "The hands down best book ever written on the subject of Theater Organ registration. Get a copy of this if you can, it is worth its weight in gold."

In addition to musical performance, he works as an organ consultant, most notably for instruments built by the Allen Organ Company. In collaboration with Allen Organs and the ATOS, he and four other artists recorded a five-DVD instructional video entitled “The Art of Playing Theatre Organ”.

== Discography ==
Walt Strony has made numerous recordings and can be heard on over 30 albums. His first recording was made in 1976 at the Chicago Theatre, where he was the first organist to play that instrument on a semi-regular basis in 25 years.

Solo Albums

Album Title	Instrument	©
Walter Strony Plays the Chicago Theatre Wurlitzer	Chicago Theatre (LP)	1976
Organ Stop Pizza Presents Walter Strony	Organ Stop Pizza, Phoenix (LP)	1978
Mundelein, 1980	St. Mary of the Lake Seminary (LP)	1980
Listener's Choice	Organ Stop Pizza, Phoenix (LP)	1984
Down By The Riverside	Riverside Theatre, Milwaukee (Cass)	1986
In The Mood	Organ Stop Pizza, Mesa (Cass)	1986
A Walt Strony Concert	California Theatre, San Diego (Cass)	1988
Innovation	Allen Custom Digital Organ (Cass)	1990
Phoenix	Krughoff Res., Downers Grove, IL (CD)	1990
Modern Theatre Pipe Organ	Gilson Residence, Madison, WI & 2 others (CD)	1992
Berkeley!	Berkeley Community Theatre (CD)	1993
Encores Vol. 1	California Theatre, Chicago Theatre & Mundelein (CD)	1993
Encores, Vol. 2	Riverside Theatre, Milwaukee (CD)	1996
Walt Strony In Australia	Capri Theatre, Adelaide (CD)	1996
A Kautz Family Christmas	Ironstone Robert Morton (CD)	1997
Walt Strony at the Alhambra Theatre Pipe Organ	Ironstone Robert Morton (CD)	1997
By Request	Aveni Residence, Gates Mills OH (CD)	1998
A Kautz Family Collection Ironstone Vineyards	Ironstone Robert Morton (CD)	2003
Live	Allen STR-4 (CD)	2004
Strony At Sanfilippo's	Sanfilippo Residence 5/80, Barrington IL (CD)	2007
Theatre Organ Showpieces	Aveni Residence 4/60, Gates Mills, OH (CD)	2013

With Others (CD)

Album Title	Instrument	©
Pipe Organ Extravaganza 1 1996	Rialto Square Theatre, Joliet IL	1997
Pipe Organ Extravaganza 2 1997	Rialto Square Theatre, Joliet IL	1997
Simple Gifts	Sanfilippo Residence 5/80, Barrington IL	1998
Pipe Organ Extravaganza 3 1998	Rialto Square Theatre, Joliet IL	1999
Pipe Organ Extravaganza 4 1999	Rialto Square Theatre, Joliet IL	2000
Just For The Fun Of It - A Cast of Stars	Spreckels Organ, San Diego	2001
On The Air - TOS Australia	Capri Theatre, Adelaide	2003
Wheaton-Fox Studio All Stars	Van Der Molen Residence Robert Morton, Wheaton IL	2006
Fabulous Fox Organ Weekend	Atlanta Fox Moller	2007
Seattle 2010 - Where It All Began	Tahoma Studio, Maple Valley WA	2010

Videos

Album Title	Instrument	©
Walt Strony In Concert	Custom Allen @ factory (VHS)	1990
John Ferguson and Friends - The Art of Playing Theatre Organ	Allen LL-324 and STR-4 (DVD)	2010
