= Ironwood Theatre =

- U.S. National Register of Historic Places
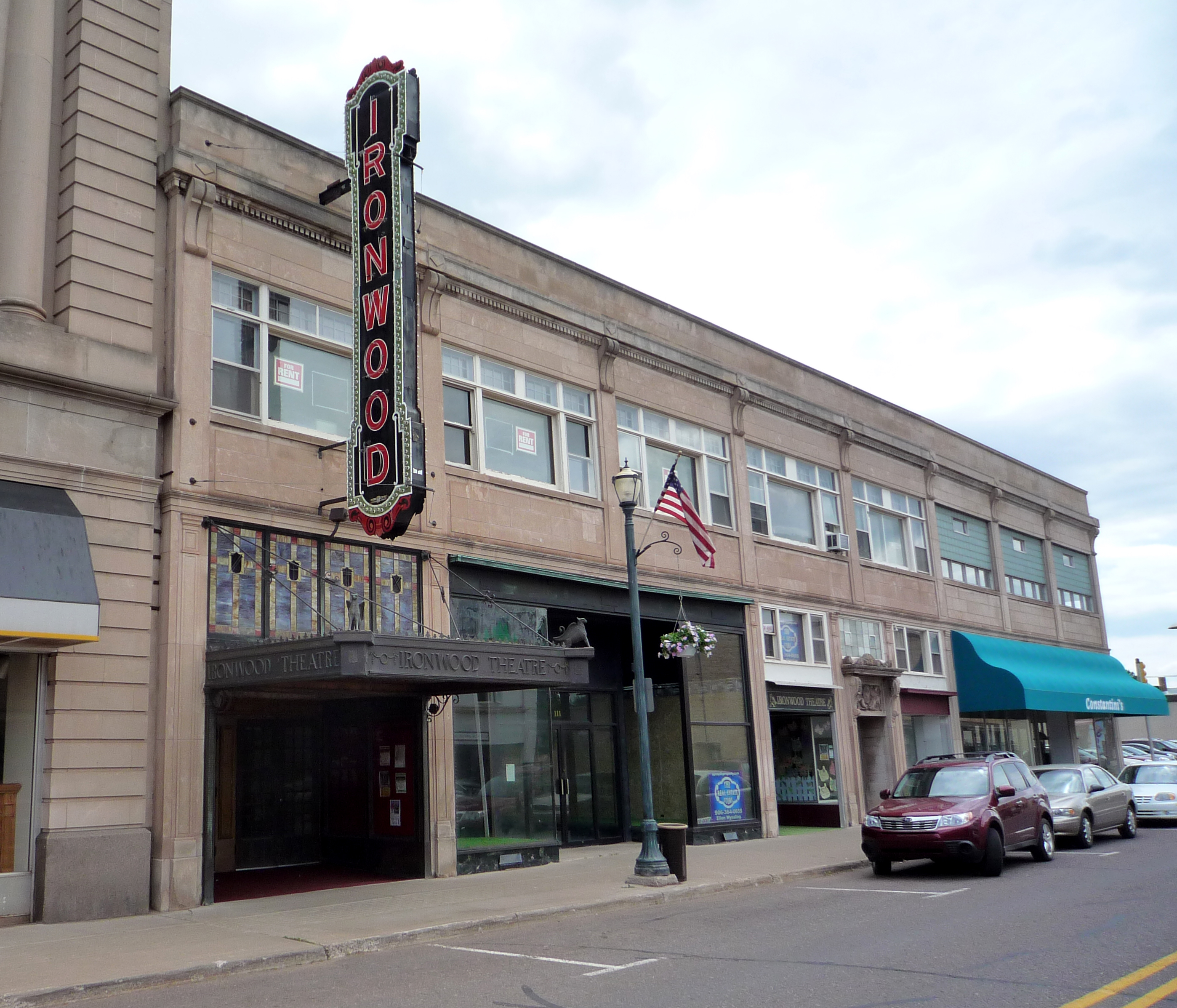
- Interactive map
- Location: 109 E. Aurora Street; Ironwood, Michigan
- Coordinates: 46°27′14″N 90°10′10″W
- Area: Less than one acre
- Built: 1928
- Architect: Albert Nelson
- Architectural style: Italian Renaissance
- NRHP reference No.: 85000061
- Added to NRHP: January 11, 1985

The Historic Ironwood Theatre is a theatre in Ironwood, Michigan, United States, offering a variety of live theatrical, musical, and artistic performances. The theatre is a non-profit entertainment establishment owned by the City of Ironwood and operated by Ironwood Theatre Inc., a non-profit organization led by volunteers who serve on the board of directors.

== History ==
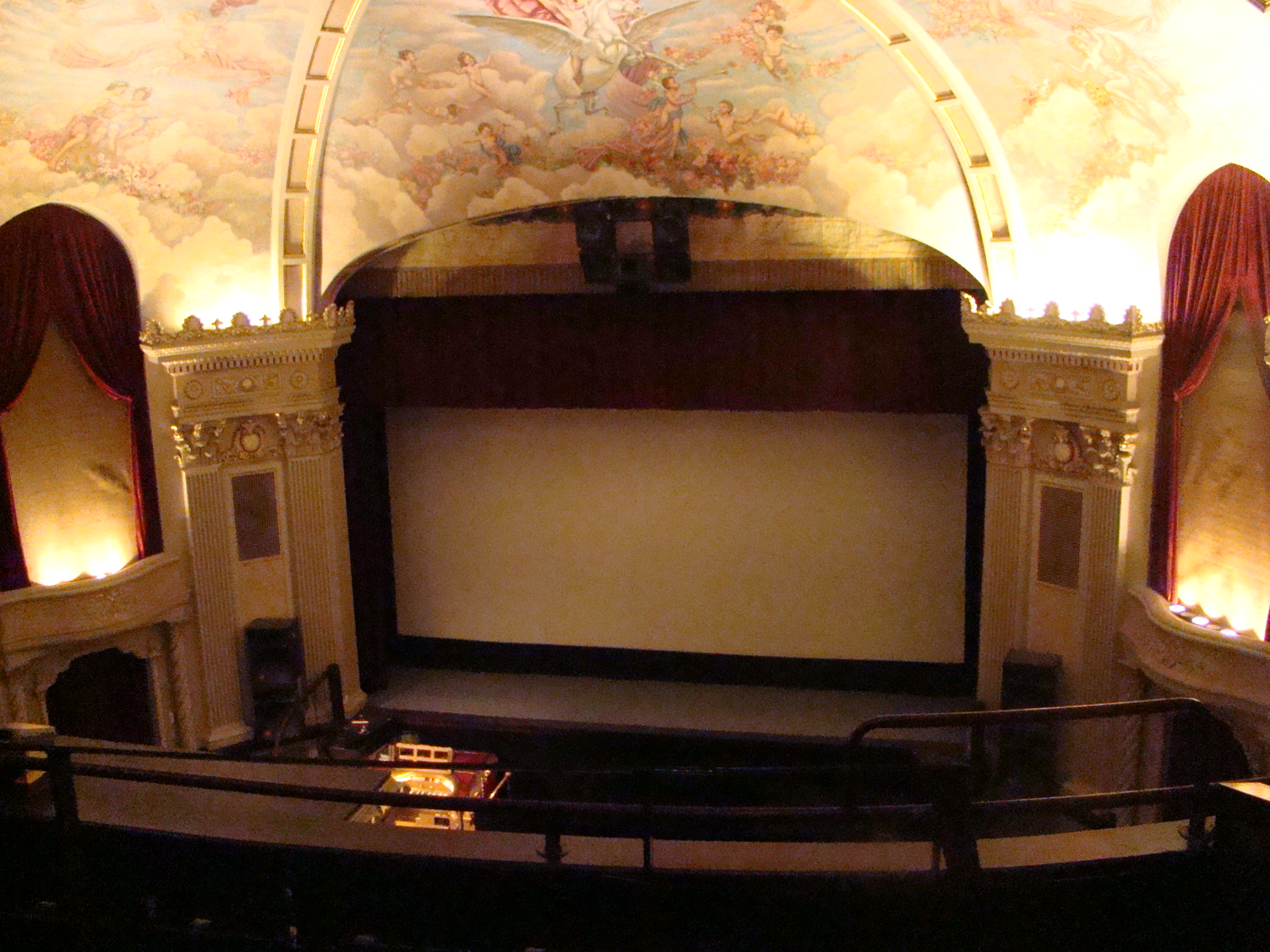
Interior of the auditorium

Constructed in 1928, one of three movie houses in Ironwood at the time, the theatre presented first run films and vaudeville shows. The first feature film shown was Wings (1927), starring Clara Bow, Charles Rogers, Richard Arlen, and Gary Cooper. Notably, the same film was shown at the unveiling of the rededicated Barton Organ with Dr. Steven Ball performing on September 18, 2010.

The theatre continued as a movie and vaudeville house under the direction of A.L. Pikar through the Golden Age of Hollywood of the 1930s, 40s, and 50s—the theatre flourished during these decades. Experiencing extreme financial difficulties in the late 70s, the theatre closed its doors in the spring of 1982.

In 1982, owner Thomas Renn gave the Ironwood Theatre to the City of Ironwood through the Downtown Ironwood Development Authority (DIDA). The theatre reopened in 1988 as a non-profit cultural organization featuring a wide range of programming. In 2010, the City of Ironwood purchased the adjacent Seaman building, which it renamed the City Centre. The purchase provided the theatre with "the concourse and additional space for an elevator, new restrooms, offices and even a catering kitchen." The City of Ironwood is developing plans to install handicapped bathroom facilities at the theatre.

== Design and architecture ==
The theatre was designed by self-taught Ironwood architect Albert Nelson, and was constructed in 1928 at a cost of $160,000 (the equivalent of approximately $2 million today). The architecture was modeled after the Italian Renaissance style featuring hand-sculpted faux pillars and arched proscenium style stage. The building seated 1,000 when it opened, with 600 seats on the main floor and 400 seats on the balcony level.

Due to many restoration efforts and improvements of the theatre's design, many seats were removed to accommodate for added luxuries including a handicapped accessible area, light & sound booth, and concession stand. The theatre now seats 732—480 seats on the main floor and 252 seats in the balcony. The chairs found in the theatre today are exact replica replacements of the seats originally installed.

== The Barton organ ==
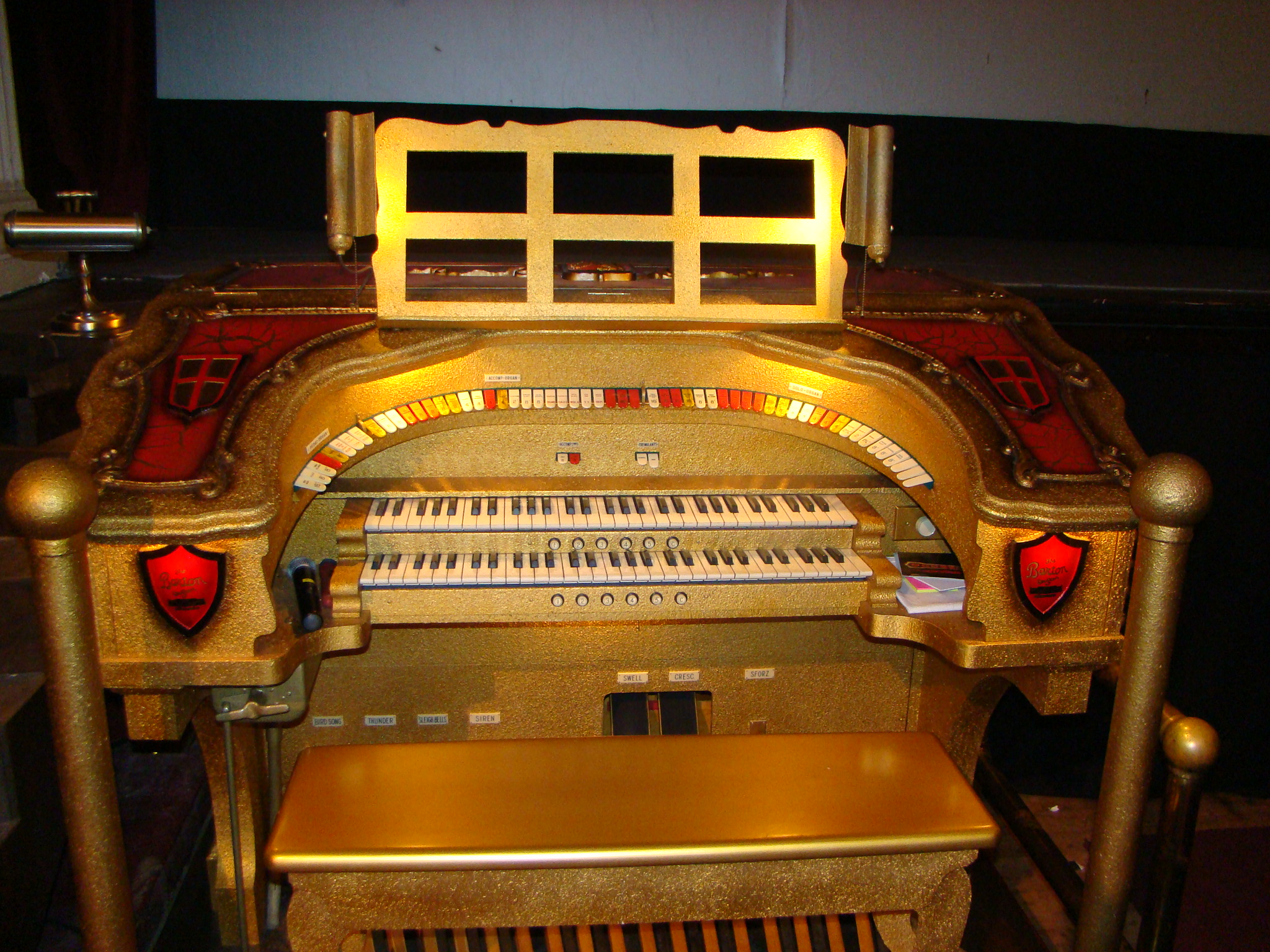
The restored 2/7 Barton Theatre Organ

The Barton organ, nicknamed "The Grand Old Lady", remains in place on its pedestal where it was installed in 1928. The historic theatre organ is a 2-manual, 7-rank, 499-pipe organ that is still completely playable. Restoration efforts on the organ began in 2000 under the direction of Dr. Tom Peacock. Volunteers were taught by experts on inspection and repair of the console, pipes, valves, and wiring. Virtually all organ components were inspected and cleaned, with replacements of all leather materials, which were in dire need of replacement. Much of the wire running from the switchboard to the console was replaced as required by electrical code—this included over 700 solder connections on the back of the console.

After countless hours of volunteer work and thousands of dollars from grants and donations, the Barton Organ console returned from the Carlton Smith Pipe Organ Restoration company in June 2010, completing the restoration of the infamous organ console. The instrument is now completely playable.

It was announced on Saturday, September 18, 2010, that the American Theatre Organ Society would like to open a chapter in Ironwood, Michigan. Plans to establish an Upper Peninsula chapter involve theatres across northern Michigan.

Of the roughly 250 pipe organs built by the Barton Organ Company, the Ironwood Theatre Barton is one of an estimated 40 that are still in their original homes, and is one of only six documented Bartons that are still playable. As of 2010, the Ironwood Theatre Organ is the most recently restored Barton.

== Events, performances, and productions ==
The modern era of the theatre includes performances from Matt Giraud (2011), Jeff Daniels (2009), Duquesne University Tamburitzans, Robin and Linda Williams, Lake Superior Big Top Chautauqua, Pine Mountain Music Festival, Dr. Steven Ball, Andrew Rogers (2012, 2013), Heroes, Hounds of Finn, Ironwood Dance Company, Detroit Symphony Orchestra, Rodgers and Hammerstein's musical South Pacific, the musical Chicago, and many other local, regional, and national acts.

=== H.I.T. Idol ===
On Thursday, November 17, 2011, The Historic Ironwood Theatre Presents H.I.T. Idol showcased 41 finalists who sang solos in a style similar to American Idol, and six winners were selected to perform the following night as opening acts for 2008 American Idol finalist Matt Giraud. All of the finalists had an opportunity to sing backup vocals for two of Giraud's songs. In addition to the show focusing on the musical talent of local youth, H.I.T. Idol was a Historic Ironwood Theatre production, with volunteers overseeing all aspects of the show.

== Proscenium Mural ==
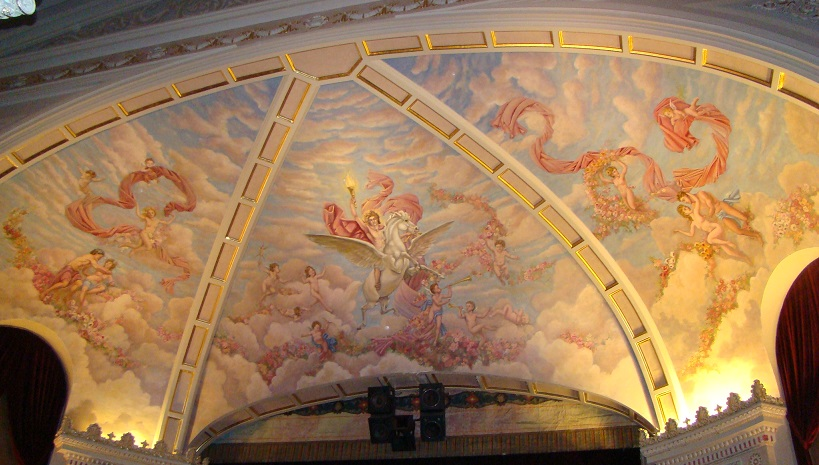
The proscenium mural

The proscenium mural of the theatre displays a stunning three-piece canvas painting by artist William Hasenberg. This was painted during the finishing stages of construction in 1927 to complete the theatre's grand-scale look. During a renovation in 1973, the mural and surrounding ceiling were painted with dark blue and white paint. The repainting was thought to have destroyed the mural until restoration efforts by muralist David Strickland proved successful in removing the paint without destroying the underlying mural. The 1994 restoration project restored the mural to its original look. The mural, now perfectly restored, catches the eye of every guest who steps into the auditorium.
