= Temple Theatre (Saginaw, Michigan) =

Theater in Saginaw, Michigan

Coordinates: 43.4347°N 83.939°W

- The Temple Theatre complex in 2019, with the clubhouse at the right
- Interactive map of Temple Theatre
- Address: 201 N. Washington Ave; Saginaw, Michigan
- Operator: TempleArts
- Capacity: 1750

Construction
- Groundbreaking: September 28, 1926
- Opened: July 28, 1927; 99 years ago
- Reopened: November 7, 2003
- Architects: Osgood & Osgood, Grand Rapids, MI
- General contractors: Henry C. Webber Construction Co., Bay City, MI

Website
- templetheatre.com
- Temple Theatre
- U.S. Historic district – Contributing property
- Part of: East Saginaw Historic Business District (ID82002867)
- Designated CP: July 9, 1982

The Temple Theatre is a historic theater, located on the banks of the Saginaw River in Saginaw, Michigan. The Temple was built in 1927 for the Elf Khurafeh Shriners, and operated for 50 years by W. S. Butterfield Theatres. The theatre complex also contains the former clubhouse of the Elf Khurafeh Shrine, now in use as event space.

The 1,750-seat Temple Theatre, nicknamed the "Showplace of Northeastern Michigan," is the home of multiple Saginaw-based arts organizations, including the Saginaw Bay Symphony Orchestra and the Saginaw Choral Society. The Temple also regularly presents film screenings and national touring shows.

== History ==
The Temple Theatre was built by the Elf Khurafeh chapter of the Shriners, an appendant body of Freemasonry. The Elf Khurafeh Shrine intended it to be a worthy successor to the Academy of Music, a nearby theatre that burned down in 1917.

The Elf Khurafeh Shrine began planning for a building of their own in 1908, and started raising funds in 1912. Their initial plan was for a grand temple, to be shared by multiple Masonic organizations in the area. This proposal was unsuccessful, and the Shrine instead planned a large commercial theatre attached to a 3-story private clubhouse. This dual use, in which the theatre was reserved for ritual use on certain days, was common in other Shrine temples of the era, some of which became Fox Theatres.

The complex was designed by Grand Rapids architects Osgood & Osgood, and built at a cost of $650,000, equivalent to $9.2 million in 2024. Osgood & Osgood specialized in Masonic temples, a specialization that enabled the effective dual-purpose nature of the building.

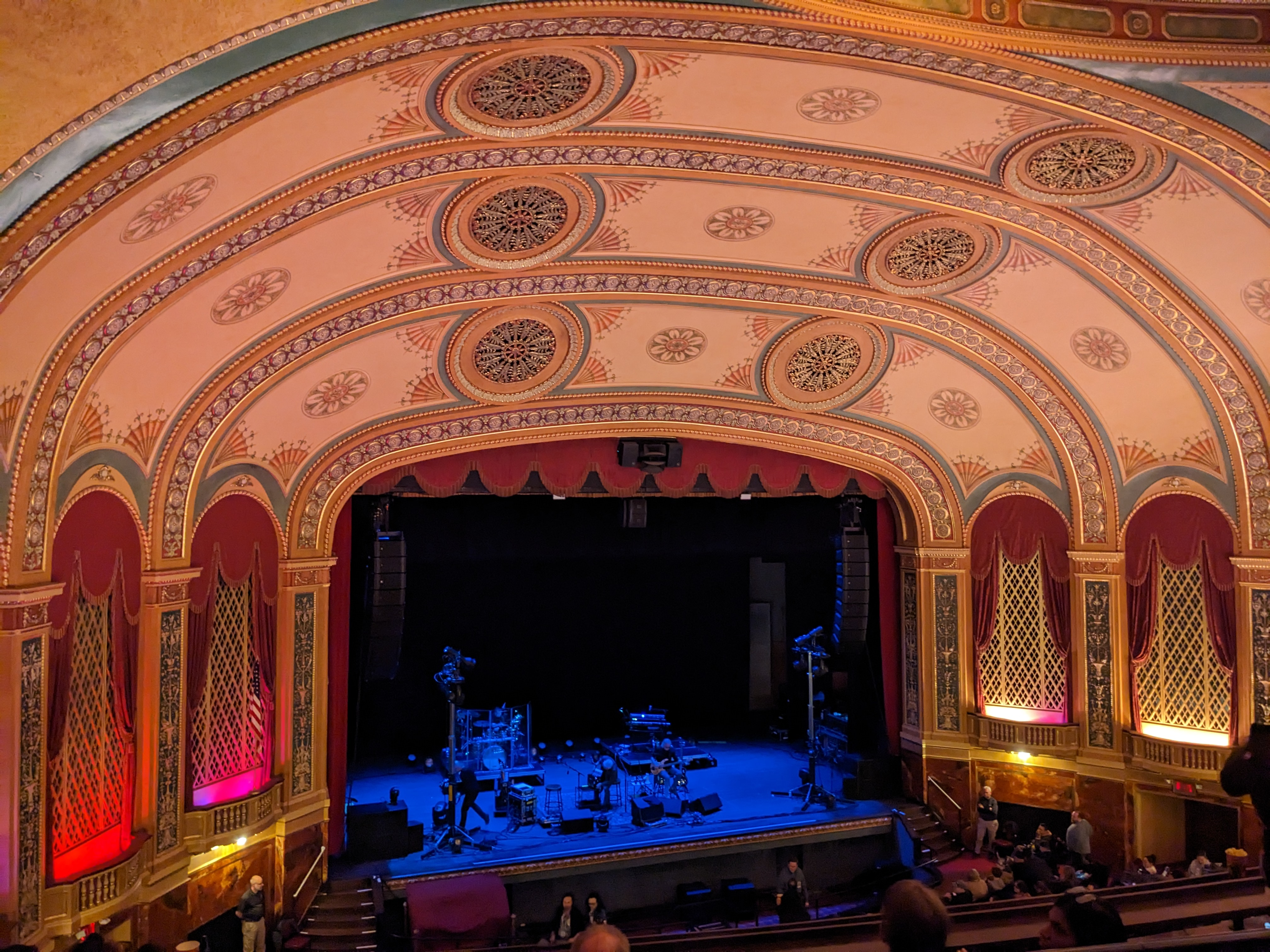
Interior of the auditorium from the balcony, taken before a "Weird Al" Yankovic concert in 2023

Construction of the theatre began in September 1926. W. S. Butterfield Theatres took out a 30-year lease on the theatre, to be operated alongside the five others it managed in Saginaw. At its opening, the 2,196-seat Temple Theatre was the largest theatre in the state of Michigan outside Detroit, and the largest in the Butterfield circuit. The interior finishing of the theatre was delegated to Butterfield, which hired the Detroit firm of Tuttle & Clark to provide decorations, emphasizing luxury and refinement.

The Temple Theatre opened on July 28, 1927, with a program of three vaudeville acts and two silent films, accompanied by organ and orchestra. Sound films were introduced shortly afterwards with The Rainbow Man in 1929, and the theatre's programming quickly shifted to sound films and occasional touring shows.

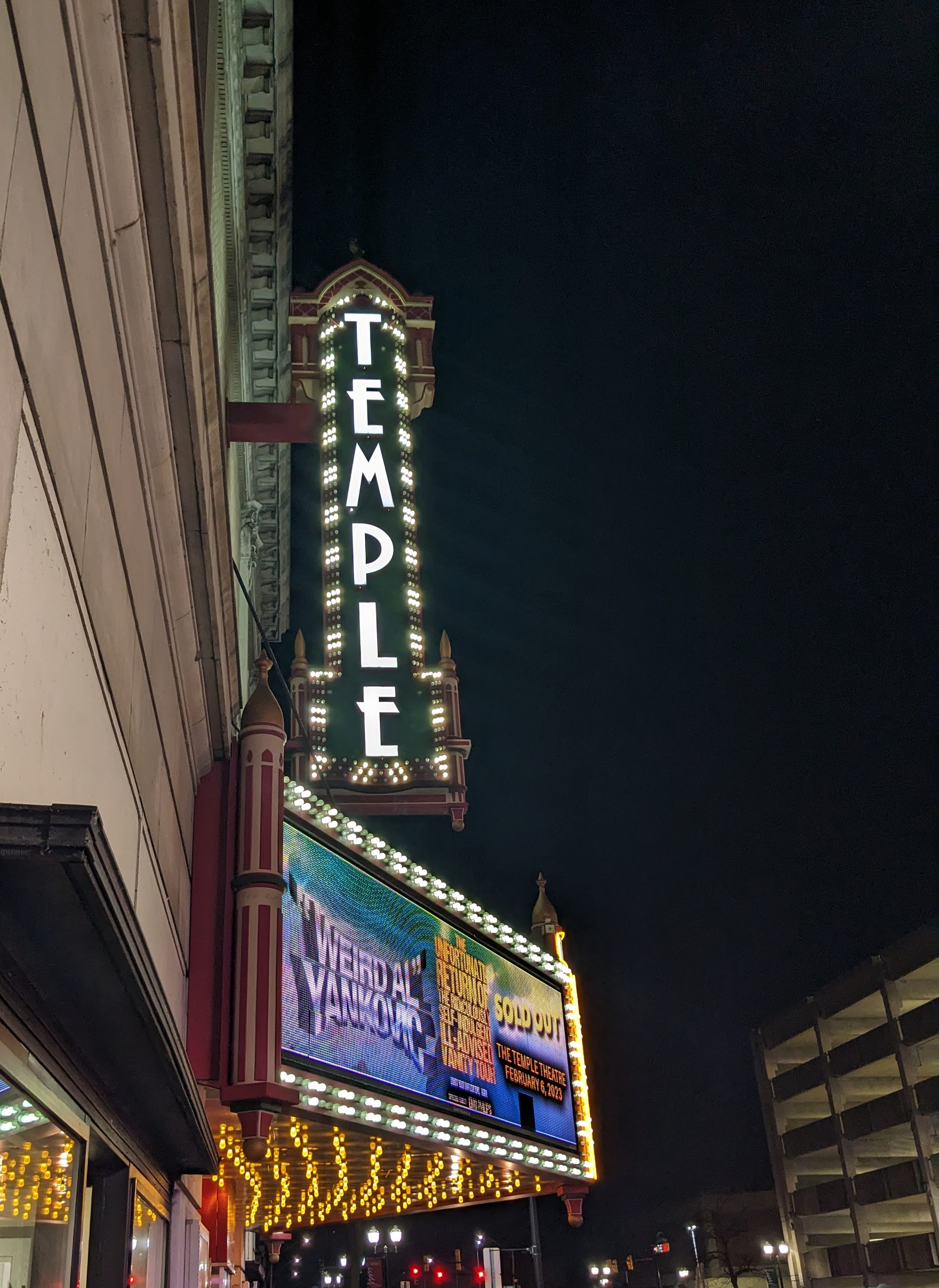
Detail of the marquee

The back wall of the theatre, facing the Saginaw River, served as an advertising space throughout the building's history. A Coca-Cola advertisement was painted in the 1930s, and remained in place for six decades. In line with contemporary trends, the theatre's original vertical "TEMPLE" marquee was replaced with a smaller, triangular marquee in 1960. In 1970, the Temple Theatre Organ Club was formed as an affiliate of the American Theatre Organ Society, to preserve the original Barton organ.

Butterfield operated the theatre until 1977, shuttering it amidst rising competition from suburban multiplexes. The final film shown at the Temple under Butterfield was Rocky, on December 10, 1977. The Temple Theatre represented the decline of the company itself, which exited the business in 1984. Following Butterfield's departure, the Shrine leased the theatre to multiple commercial and nonprofit operators, and painted its own logo on the back wall. The Elf Khurafeh Shrine's ownership of the complex ended in 2000, when it was sold to an investment firm.

By 2002, the Temple Theatre was in poor condition, with no heat and a leaky roof. The Standard Federal Bank foreclosed on the theatre, whose owners had defaulted on the mortgage. Prominent Saginaw doctor Samuel H. Shaheen bought the theatre in 2002 for $600,000, and committed to investing an additional $750,000 for renovations. Renovation work to the theatre included the removal of water damage and the restoration of original decorative painting, some of which had been painted over. The seating capacity was reduced to 1,750 during the renovation, creating opportunities for VIP seating and additional legroom. The Temple Theatre reopened on November 7, 2003.

The Shaheen family were awarded the Governor’s Award for Historic Preservation in 2005, in recognition of the progress made on the theatre.

An independent foundation was created to operate the theater in 2010, and additional restoration work was performed on the organ in 2011. The renovation program was complete with a new vertical marquee, inspired by the original, which was installed in 2016.

The Temple Theatre Foundation merged with the Saginaw Art Museum in 2021, creating the new entity TempleArts. The partnership of the two Saginaw cultural landmarks ensures that both can continue to operate despite the challenges brought on by the COVID-19 pandemic's impact.

== Features ==
=== Organ ===
The Temple Theatre is home to its original 3-manual/11-rank theatre organ, built by the Bartola Musical Instrument Company. The organ is a model B-3 "Butterfield Special," serial number 195, one of 12 built to a design specified by W. S. Butterfield Theatres. The "Butterfield Specials" are praised for their versatility, and exemplify the signature tone of the "Golden-Voiced Barton." Despite this versatility, the "Butterfield Specials" are occasionally the subject of strong criticism from organ enthusiasts.

The organ is played regularly before performances by members of the Temple Theatre Organ Club.

== Programming ==
Regular programming at the Temple Theatre includes local performing arts organizations, touring shows, films, summer camps, and community events. The ballroom, located in the former Elf Khurafeh Shriners clubhouse, is available for rental for private events and weddings.

The Saginaw Silver Screen series shows classic and contemporary films for all ages, with an organ performance before each screening.

The Temple Theatre is home to multiple affiliated performing arts organizations, including the Saginaw Bay Symphony Orchestra and the Saginaw Choral Society.

=== 2024 Notable Performances ===
February 29, 2024 - Hannah Berner: I'm on Tour

March 16, 2024 - Joe Gatto's Night of Comedy

April 11, 2024 - An Evening with Itzhak Perlman

April 29, 2024 - Whose Live Anyway

August 16, 2024 - Buddy Guy: Damn Right Farewell Tour

October 2, 2024 - An Evening with Yo-Yo Ma: Reflections in Words and Music

October 4, 2024 - Steve Martin & Martin Short: Dukes of Funnytown

October 6, 2024 - John Crist's Jokes for Humans

October 9, 2024 - Charlie Berens: Good Old Fashioned Tour

October 12, 2024 - Get the Led Out: A Tribute to the Mighty Zep

November 2, 2024 - Rob Schneider: Rescue Husband

November 22, 2024- Classical Arts Entertainment Presents: The Nutcracker

December 1, 2024 - Blippi! Join the Band Tour

=== 2023 Notable Performances ===
January 29, 2023 - Jason Isbell & the 400 Unit wsg Peter One

February 6, 2023 - "Weird Al" Yankovic: The Unfortunate Return of the Ridiculously Self-Indulgent, Ill-Advised Vanity Tour

February 17, 2023 - John Crist: Emotional Support Tour

June 23, 2023 - Tim Allen

July 27, 2023 - Cheap Trick

August 9, 2023 - Ted Nugent

September 21, 2023 - Bored Teachers Comedy Tour

September 22, 2023 - The Guess Who

September 30, 2023 - Kevin James: The Irregardless Tour

November 9, 2023 - Lewis Black: Off the Rails Tour

November 25, 2023 - Chris Isaak: It's Almost Christmas Tour

November 26, 2023 - Classical Arts Entertainment presents: Snow White & the Seven Dwarfs

December 28, 2023 - Greensky Bluegrass
