= Allen Organ Company =

Musical instrument company which builds church organs, home organs and theatre organs

Allen Organ Company LLC
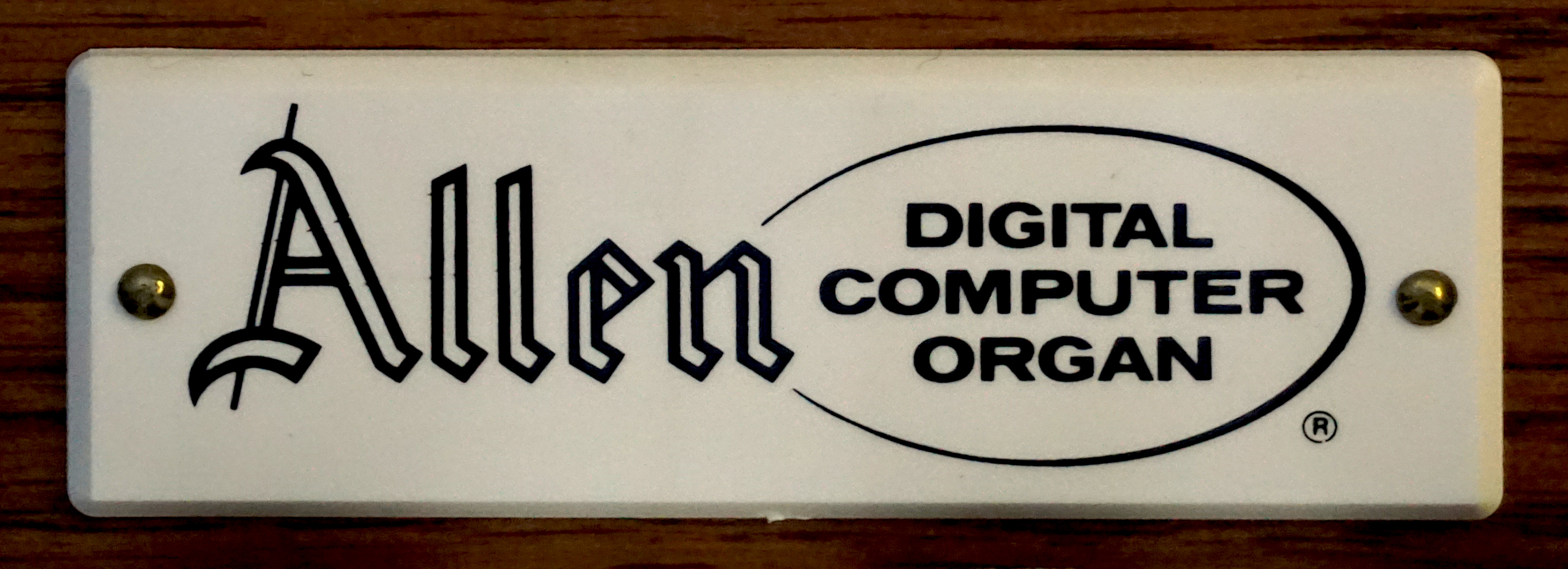
- Type: Private
- Founded: 1937; 89 years ago
- Founder: Jerome Markowitz
- Headquarters: Macungie, Pennsylvania, U.S.
- Key people: Steve Markowitz
- Products: classical church organs (digital and pipes, also combined)
- Website: www.allenorgan.com

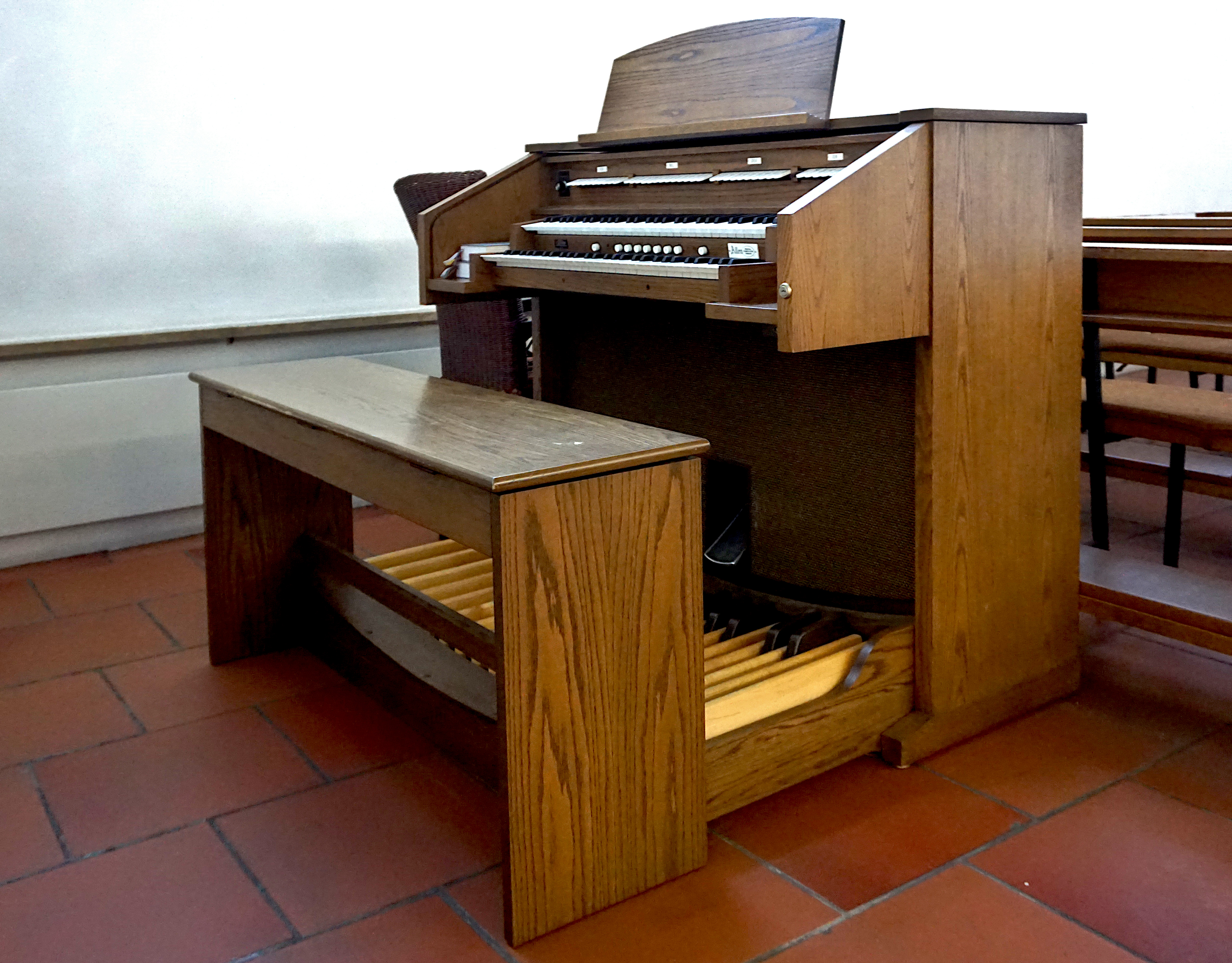
Allen Organ

Allen Organ Company LLC builds digital church organs, home organs, and theatre organs. Its factory is located in Macungie, Pennsylvania.

== History ==
Allen Organ Company was founded in 1937 and named after its birthplace, Allentown, Pennsylvania. The company was incorporated in 1945, after interruption by World War II. Since its beginning, Allen has been managed by the same family. Steve Markowitz, the current President, is the son of the founder, Jerome Markowitz.

The company had its first patent in 1938. Allen continued to advance analog tone generation through the 1960s with further patents. In 1971, as the culmination of a collaborative effort with North American Rockwell, Allen introduced the world's first commercially available digital musical instrument. Allen was responsible for the first three-manual electronic organ and the first electronic drawknob console. The first Allen Digital Organ is now in the Smithsonian Institution.

Allen Organ Company added a manufacturing branch in England in 1969.

== Technology ==
=== Quantum line ===
The Quantum organ line uses a digital processing technique called the convolution reverb, a technique widely used in both software and hardware musical instruments. In Allen's implementation of the technique, the acoustics of the sampled room become an integral part of the organ's sound. An 8-second stereo convolution reverb requires about 35 billion calculations per second; Allen patented a technique to reduce the computation amount to about 400 million calculations per second. A digital organ that produces Compact Disc quality sound without convolution reverb would require only about 100,000 calculations per second for each sound. Quantum organs include about 4,000 times that capacity to create convolution reverb.

=== Electric organs ===
The Allen organ is a type of electronic organ that was created in 1937 and 1939. The Allen organ company was also responsible for creating the first transistorized organ in 1951. In addition to that, a new way of generating sound, by digital waves, for the organ was produced in 1971. This new technology, new at the time, is seen in many organs that are available now.

Allen Organs created a handful of electric pianos in the 1970s and 1980s. Some are:

- Electra-Piano
- Rock-si-cord
- RMI Keyboard Computer KC-I (1974) and KC-II (1975) (these are early polyphonic synthesizers released in 1970s.)

== Museum ==
The Allen Organ Company factory building is located at 150 Locust Street in Macungie, Pennsylvania. It was originally an air conditioned textile mill that Allen's founder, Jerome Markowitz and vice president purchased, they renovated the mill and moved organ manufacturing into around 1953. As the company grew, The International Sales Headquarters was built including Octave Hall (a room with adjustable natural reverb and rotating stage), teaching studios, a recording studio and the adjoining Jerome Markowitz Memorial Museum is located on PA Route 100. In the museum, visitors can see the development of Allen technology from tube analog organs from 1938 to the present, how an organ is made and the history, and tour the museum.

== See also ==
- Carlo Curley, an Allen organist
- Virgil Fox, played an Allen organ on his Heavy Organ tours
- Walt Strony, an organist who designed a digital organ for Allen, the Allen STR-4
