= East Saginaw Historic Business District =

- U.S. National Register of Historic Places
- U.S. Historic district
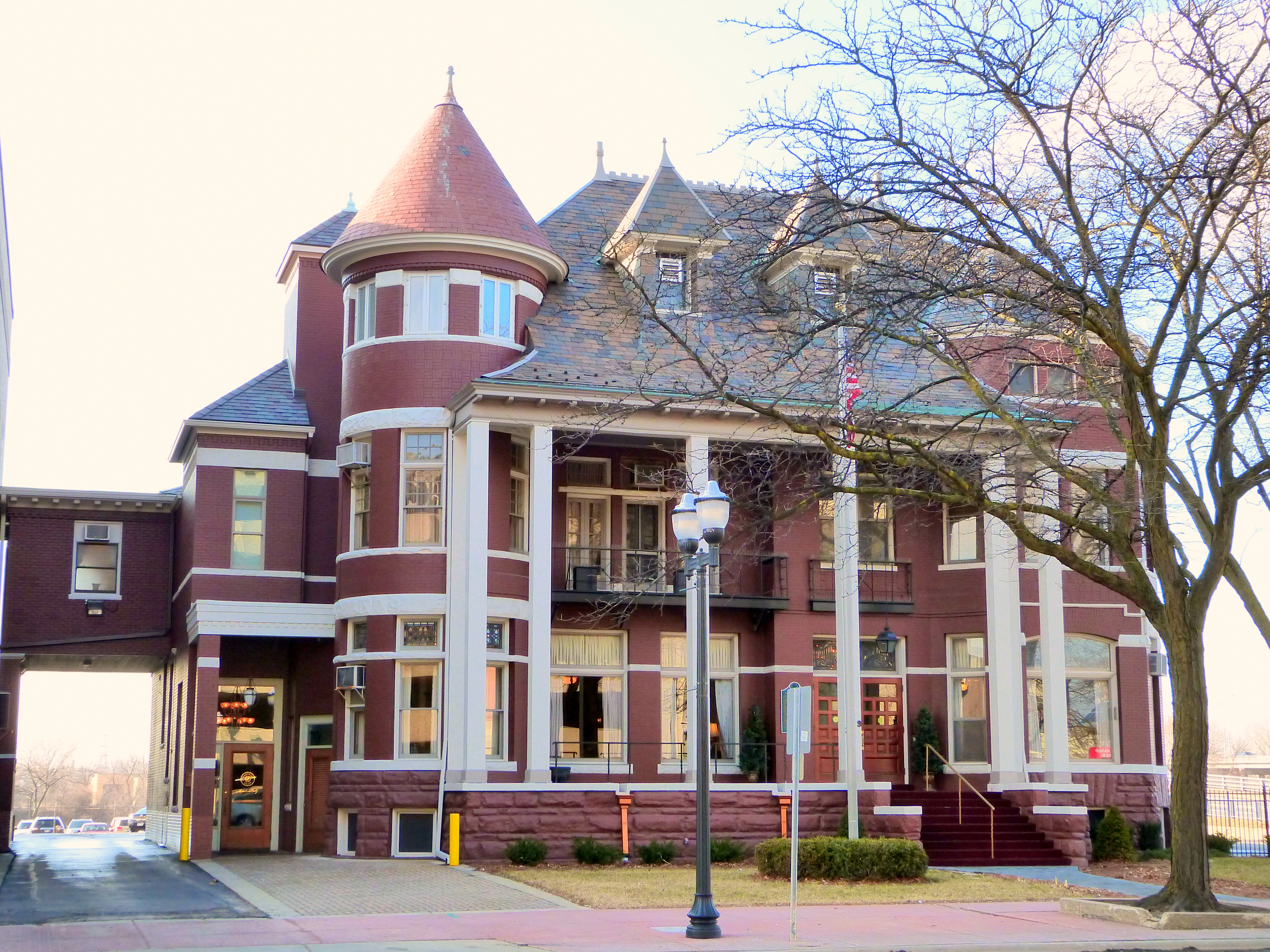
- Saginaw Club
- Interactive map
- Location: Roughly bounded by Federal, N. Water, N. Washington, and N. Franklin Sts., Saginaw, Michigan
- Coordinates: 43°26′00″N 83°56′20″W
- Area: 6.7 acres (2.7 ha)
- Architect: multiple
- Architectural style: Chicago, Late Victorian, Art Deco
- MPS: Center Saginaw MRA
- NRHP reference No.: 82002867; 84004137 (decrease)

Significant dates
- Added to NRHP: July 9, 1982
- Boundary decrease: April 26, 1984

The East Saginaw Historic Business District is a primarily commercial historic district located in Saginaw, Michigan and roughly bounded by Federal, North Water, North Washington and North Franklin Streets. It was listed on the National Register of Historic Places in 1982.

== History ==
The first structure built in what now is the East Saginaw Historic Business District was a fur trading cabin, located at the intersection of Washington and Genesee Avenues. This was replaced by the Kirby House Hotel in 1854, and the four-story Bancroft Hotel in 1858. The hotel served as an anchor for the developing community, and by the 1880s it was surrounded by multiple blocks of commercial and industrial buildings. As the turn of the century approached, the lumbering business that had once supported Saginaw declined, and so did the city's economy, However, by the early 1900s the city had rebounded. Leading the recovery was a group of local businessmen who in 1915 razed the aging Bancroft Hotel and reconstructed a new building, which again served as an anchor for the businesses in the surrounding neighborhood.

By the late 1960s, the district was entering a period of stagnation, where the structures were underutilized. However, by the 1980s, there was renewed interest in the area, and many buildings began to be redeveloped.

== Description ==
The East Saginaw Historic Business District contains 16 structures. Half of these were built in the 1870-1890 period, while nearly all the remainder were constructed in the early 20th century, between 1910 and 1930. The buildings include a Reagan of styles popular during those periods, including Italianate, Queen Anne, Chateauesque, Second Renaissance Revival, Chicago School, and Art Deco. The most prominent buildings in the district include:

- Bancroft Hotel (1915) - 107 South Washington. This six-story, reinforced concrete and brick-sheathed hotel complex was designed by the Chicago architectural firm of Schmidtt Gordent and Erikson. The original hotel contained 237 rooms, 14 suites, a restaurant and a roof garden. Additions were made to the building in the 1920s.
- Eddy Building (1870) - 100 N. Washington. The stone-faced Eddy Building was constructed at four stories in height; twenty years later another two stories were added. It is a cool grey-colored High Victorian Italianate building with varied window treatments.
- Saginaw Club (1889) - 219 N. Washington. The Saginaw Club was organized in 1889 by a group of East Saginaw's most prominent businessmen, and they constructed this three story clubhouse a short distance from their homes.
- Temple Theatre (1927) - The 1,750-seat theatre originally served as a Shriners clubhouse. Both the Saginaw Bay Symphony Orchestra and the Saginaw Choral Society perform out of the venue.

== Gallery ==
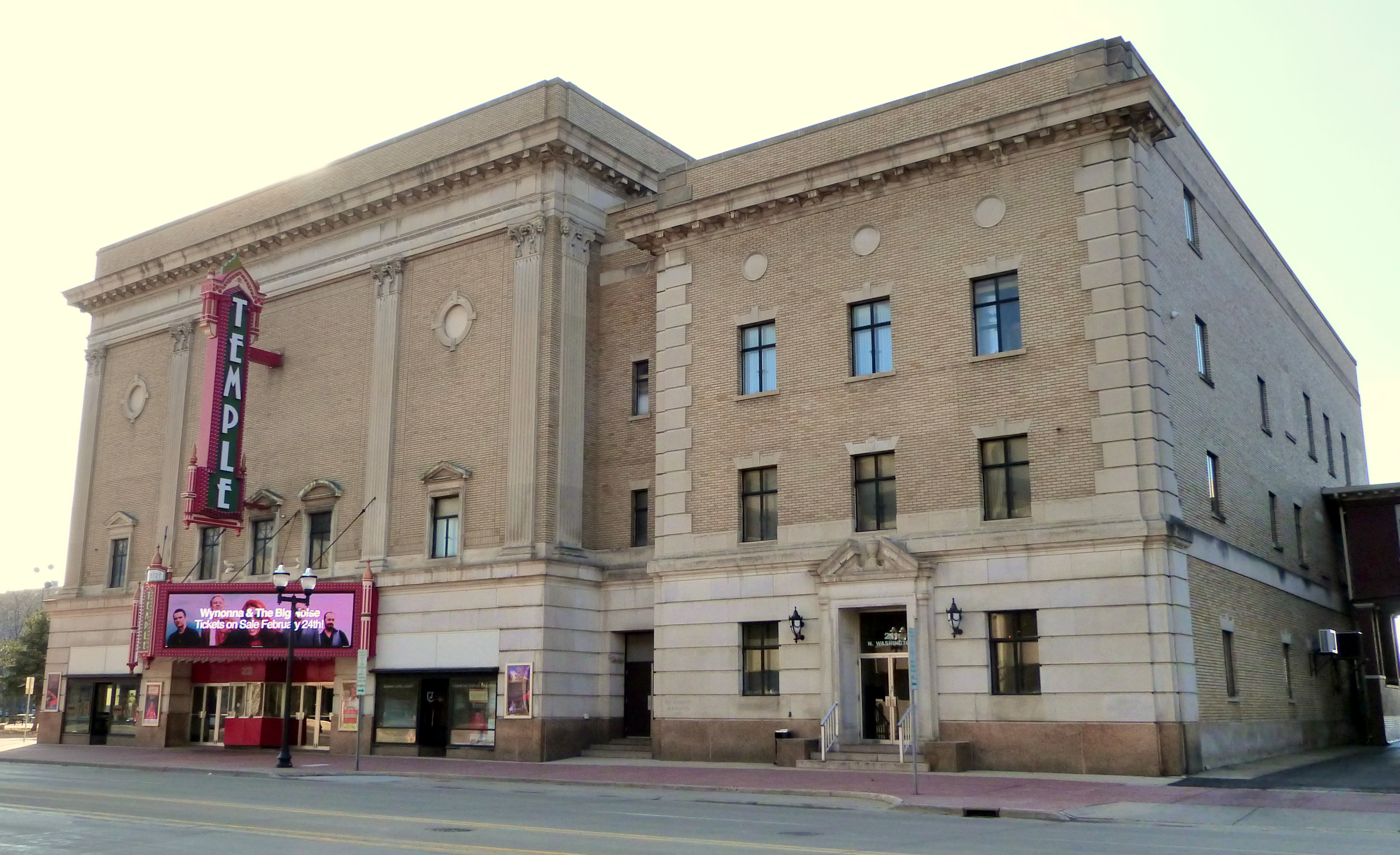
Temple Theater

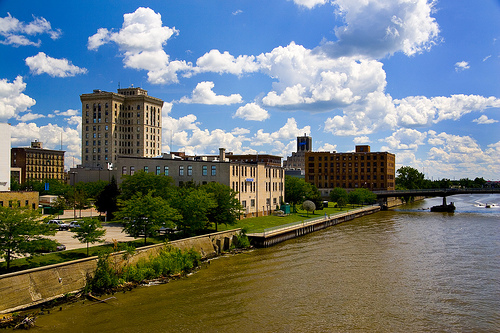
"Place of the Sauk"

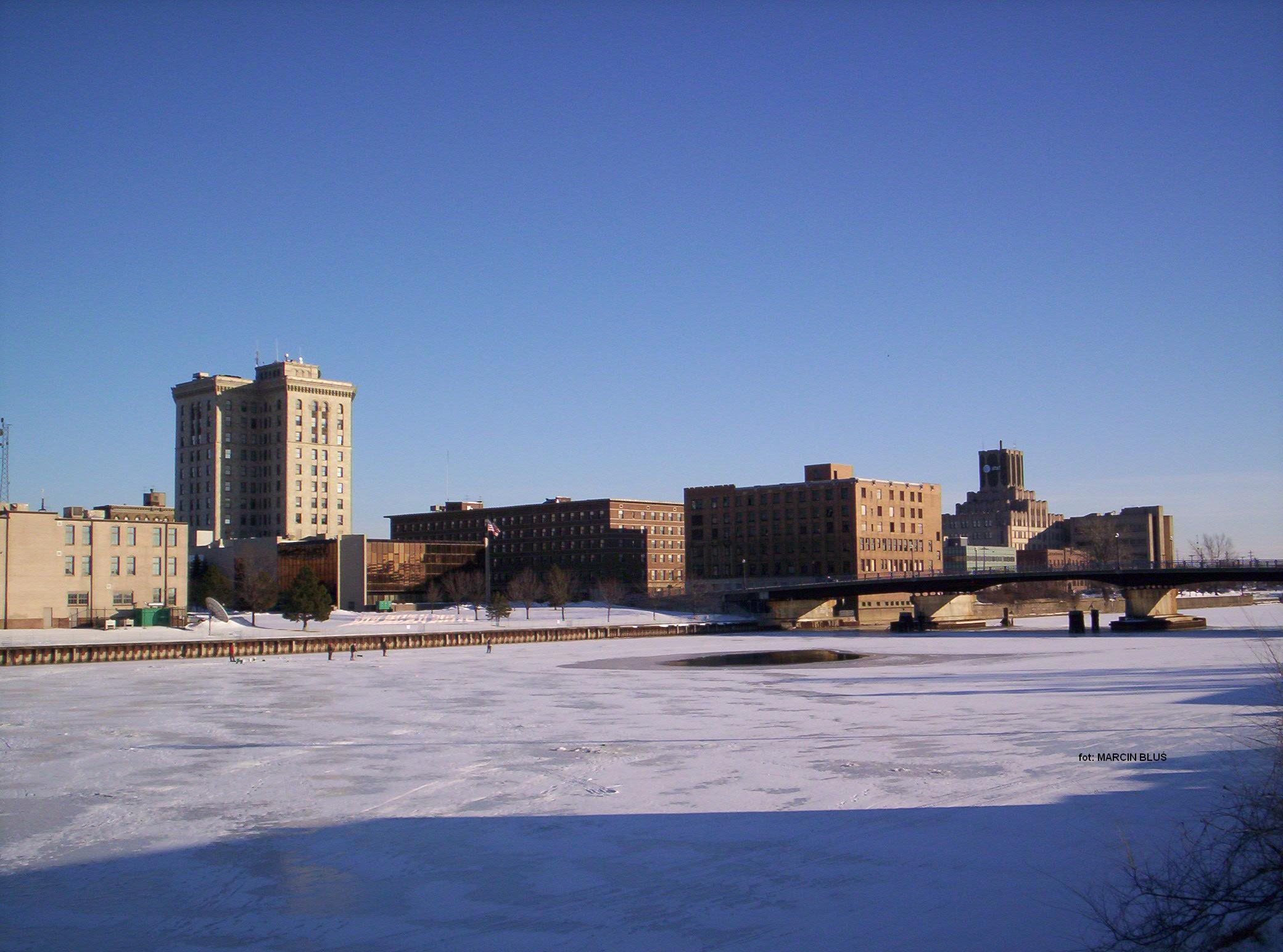
Saginaw skyline
