= Paddy Harmon =

American sports promoter (1876-1930)

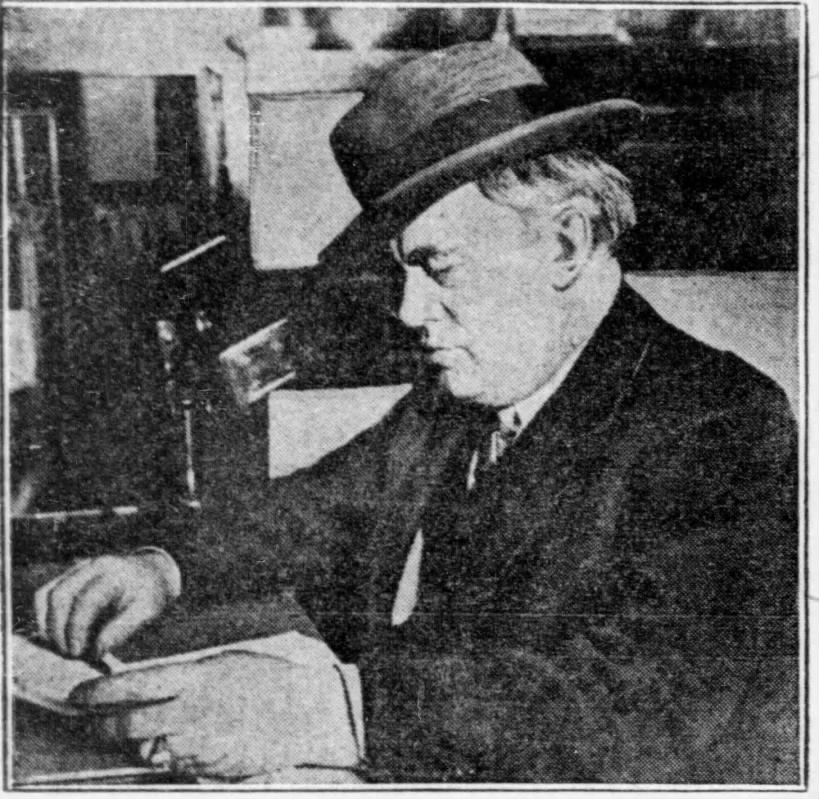
- Born: May 25, 1876; Chicago, Illinois, U.S.
- Died: July 22, 1930 (aged 54); Des Plaines, Illinois, U.S.
- Occupations: Sports promoter, Dancehall owner
- Known for: Chicago Stadium

Patrick 'Paddy' Thomas Harmon (May 25, 1876 - July 22, 1930) was an Irish American businessman and sports promoter based in Chicago, Illinois, United States. He is noted for the building of Chicago Stadium arena in 1929, then the world's largest indoor arena. Born in poverty to immigrant parents, he became an entrepreneur, owning dance halls and promoting cycling races and boxing matches. He succeeded in getting the Stadium built, even helping to fight a fire on its roof, but was ousted within a year of its opening. He died due to injuries sustained in a car crash less than a year later. He poured his entire fortune into the Stadium, leaving only his Stadium shares, and the $2.50 in his pockets to his family. His funeral was held in the Stadium, paid for by friends. The Stadium itself went bankrupt in the Depression, leaving his shares worthless.

== Biography ==
=== Family ===
Harmon was born in Chicago to Patrick J. Harmon and Mary Harmon, nee O'Sullivan, Irish immigrants from County Kerry. He was one of ten children, along with brothers Daniel, John, Martin, and Maurice; and sisters Catherine, Margaret, Estelle, Mary and Nell. The neighbourhood around the home on Vedder Street (now Scott Street), just east of Goose Island, was known as the 'gashouse district' and Paddy's father worked at the gas house until he was disabled by a workplace injury.

Harmon was married twice. In 1901, he married Marie Albertine Sauvageau, originally of Grondines, Quebec. He later married Mary J. Reilly of Chicago. Mary and Patrick had a daughter Patricia Mary, born in November 1926. Harmon also adopted a son Frank.

=== Career ===
Harmon started making money at the age of nine turning off gaslights each morning for US$16 per month. At 14, he started selling newspapers on a downtown street corner to support his family. At 16, he booked his first dance event; a dance that returned $83 on an investment of $40 to rent a hall.

A big success were roller skating promotions in 1902 and 1903 when roller skating was a craze in the Midwest. In 1909, Harmon helped build the "Ice Palace" ice skating rink, in an attempt to have year-round ice skating and ice hockey. However, the building's refrigeration system was not up to the task. It was converted to a dance hall. Harmon took it over and operated it as "Paddy Harmon's Dreamland Ballroom". By the 1920s, Harmon owned two popular ballrooms in Chicago, (the Arcadia and Dreamland) and, in 1922, won the contract to operate the ballroom at the end of the Navy Pier. At the Pier, Harmon charged 5 cents per dance, 1 cent for children. For the time, Harmon was unique in booking all-black jazz bands to the Arcadia and Dreamland. In 1925, Harmon, along with George Schluesselburg, patented the "Harmon Mute" for playing 'wah-wah' effects on the trumpet and trombone.

Harmon also was a sports promoter, initiating a six-day cycling race event in 1912 at the Dexter Park pavilion. Harmon first promoted a boxing match at age 14 and netted $375. Boxing was made illegal and Harmon only returned to being a boxing promoter after the legalization of professional boxing in Illinois in 1926 In 1926, Harmon expressed interest in buying a National Hockey League (NHL) ice hockey franchise, and had an option to buy the players of the Saskatoon Sheiks pro team, but was unsuccessful, losing out to Huntington Hardwick.

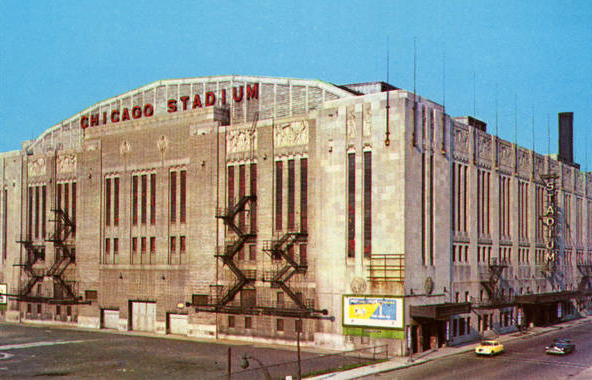
"The House That Paddy Built" Chicago Stadium in 1956.

Harmon's biggest project was announced in 1926: the Chicago Stadium, to be located in his old "Valley" neighbourhood. It was very ambitious. At first, the project envisioned 39,000 seats. Harmon invested US$2,500,000 (equivalent to $45,780,039 in 2024) in the project of a total cost of US$6,000,000 (equivalent to $109,872,093 in 2024). The Stadium opened in March 1929 with a boxing match. Several weeks later, a disgruntled workman set a fire on the Stadium's roof, which was in its final stages of completion. Harmon himself climbed up to the roof to help fight the fire, pouring water on the fire, while 10,000 persons were seated inside waiting for a boxing match. Harmon had survived several setbacks in getting the Stadium built: opposition from some of the NHL owners, the Madison Square Gardens of New York which hoped to build a Garden in Chicago, and investors pulling out. Harmon persevered, "I was knocked down 20 times after I thought I have everything all set", following his homespun philosophy "Never Stay Licked." The stadium opened in March 1929 with a bout between Tommy Loughran and Mickey Walker for a purse of US$150,000 (equivalent to $2,746,802 in 2024) (won by Loughran). The Stadium held a lightweight championship fight between Sammy Mandell and Tony Canzoneri on August 3, 1929. Harmon had to provide 959 free tickets to the Illinois Boxing Commission for the fight, for which he complained to the press.

The Stadium was not an immediate success for Harmon, who owned 42.5% of the Stadium's stock. Harmon reached an impasse trying to get the Chicago Black Hawks NHL ice hockey team as a tenant, leaving the Stadium without ice hockey. Harmon enlisted veteran hockey executive Frank Patrick to try and get a second NHL franchise for Chicago, but the NHL refused to hear the application without the Black Hawks' consent. Harmon, along with Stadium investor James Norris, threatened to form a new hockey league, and alternatively was also interested in purchasing the Ottawa Senators NHL hockey team which was in financial trouble. The Black Hawks instead signed a lease to play another season in the Chicago Coliseum. Matters came to a head in November 1929. The Stadium shareholders forced Harmon to resign as Stadium president, while allowing him to continue in sports promotion for the Stadium. The Stadium board then signed an agreement with the Black Hawks only weeks later, accepting the Black Hawks' terms.

On December 9, 1929, not long after Harmon's ouster, an attempted bombing occurred at Norris' estate when Sidney Strotz, treasurer of the Stadium, was visiting. The fuse on a stick of dynamite placed in the dining room had gone out, preventing its explosion. Norris had purchased $600,000 of Stadium stock and had controlling interest. It was speculated by the Chicago Tribune that gangsters angry with the ouster of Harmon had placed the dynamite. In 1928, Harmon had been sued for the bombing of a shop Harmon had rented to the Vasco Heating Company. In July 1927, Harmon sought to cancel the lease but the heating company refused. A few days later the shop was bombed. Harmon tried to terminate the lease and a week later the roof was soaked with gasoline and set on fire.

After his ouster, Harmon campaigned in a Republican Party primary for the sheriff of Cook County, Illinois but was defeated.

Harmon was asked about his success as a promoter:

It is not hard to please the public. All you have to remember is that we are all born children, that we all die children and that in-between times we are children.

— Paddy Harmon, The Chicago Stadium Organ "Remember the Roar", The Tracker

Harmon also was well-known for giving to children at each Christmas.

=== Death ===
Harmon died from injuries sustained in an automobile crash. Harmon lost control of his vehicle at high speed on the Northwest Highway between Des Plaines and Mount Prospect, Illinois. His car flipped over after losing control on the soft shoulder of the highway. He died in the Des Plaines Hospital from bleeding in his lungs. He asked that his body be placed in the Chicago Stadium. His wife Mary and friend E. J. Brand were in the car and survived.

The Harmons' treatment at the Des Plaines Hospital was the subject of controversy, when it was learned that Robert Parks, manager of the hospital had forged his medical credentials. Parks worked as an auto mechanic by day, and surgeon at night. Harmon's son Frank refused to pay a $200 bill for the care of Paddy and Mary at the hospital after learning of Parks not having medical credentials. "Dr" Parks was arrested for violating Illinois medical laws.

Harmon's funeral service was held in the Stadium. The eulogy was read by Judge John Lyle: "Paddy was gruff, but back of the gruffness was a heart bigger than Chicago. Either you were his friend or you weren't - there was no middle ground."

Harmon died virtually penniless, with only the $2.50 in his pockets to his name, although he had some 204,000 shares in the Stadium. He had no life insurance and no bank account. His friends paid for the funeral. According to the Stadium president Sidney Strotz, Harmon had an estimated $70,000 to $90,000 only months before. The money disappeared without any accounting. In August 1930, the Stadium held a fund-raising boxing show to set up a trust fund for Harmon's three-year-old daughter Patricia. Gate revenues were $44,000, raising $10,000 for the fund. Later that year, May Harmon would file for bankruptcy, citing $92,000 in liabilities ($91,000 in a debt related to building the Stadium) and $150 in assets.

=== Legacy ===
The Stadium was known as the "House That Paddy Built", a monument to Harmon's ambition. The Stadium struggled for several years after the death of Harmon and was placed into receivership in 1933. It was bought in 1935 by Norris and Arthur Wirtz for US$250,000 (equivalent to $5,733,617 in 2024). Wirtz would later take over the Black Hawks ice hockey team. The Stadium was used for ice hockey, basketball and other sports, entertainment and conventions until 1994 when the United Center was built. It was demolished in 1995.

It was reported in 1933 that Frank E. Harmon, Paddy's son, had become a boxing promoter, promoting a match at the Coliseum. Frank had been in charge of the concessions at the Stadium from the start until it went into receivership.
