= Pine Mountain Music Festival =

Upper Peninsula of Michigan

- Status: active
- Genre: music festival
- Location: Upper Peninsula of Michigan
- Country: United States
- Years active: 34–35
- Inaugurated: 1991
- Website: pinemountainmusicfestival.com

The Pine Mountain Music Festival (often abbreviated PMMF) is a music festival held in the western Upper Peninsula of Michigan each summer. The festival's schedule varies each year, typically including at least one major opera, a night of scenes from famous operas, performances by several chamber music groups, a symphony, organ and voice recitals, and performances by members of the Orchestra Fellowship Program. Various master classes (including organ and voice) are also offered to community members.

Venues range across the western Upper Peninsula and northern Wisconsin, focusing on the cities of Houghton, Ontonagon, Iron Mountain, Marquette, and Land O' Lakes in Wisconsin. Most performances tour among these cities. The major performances and a season ending gala take place in and around Houghton and Marquette between early June and mid-July

The festival began in 1991 as a series of chamber music performances, and quickly expanded to include operas and symphonies. The PMMF has been host to the first performance of a locally written opera about the history of the Keweenaw. Musicians involved in the festival also mentor high school students in the Orchestra Fellowship Program at Michigan Technological University, who perform as part of the festival.

With the 2020 edition cancelled as the COVID-19 pandemic was to blame, the 31st was deferred to 2021.
