= Bartola Musical Instrument Company =

Defunct manufacturer of pipe organs

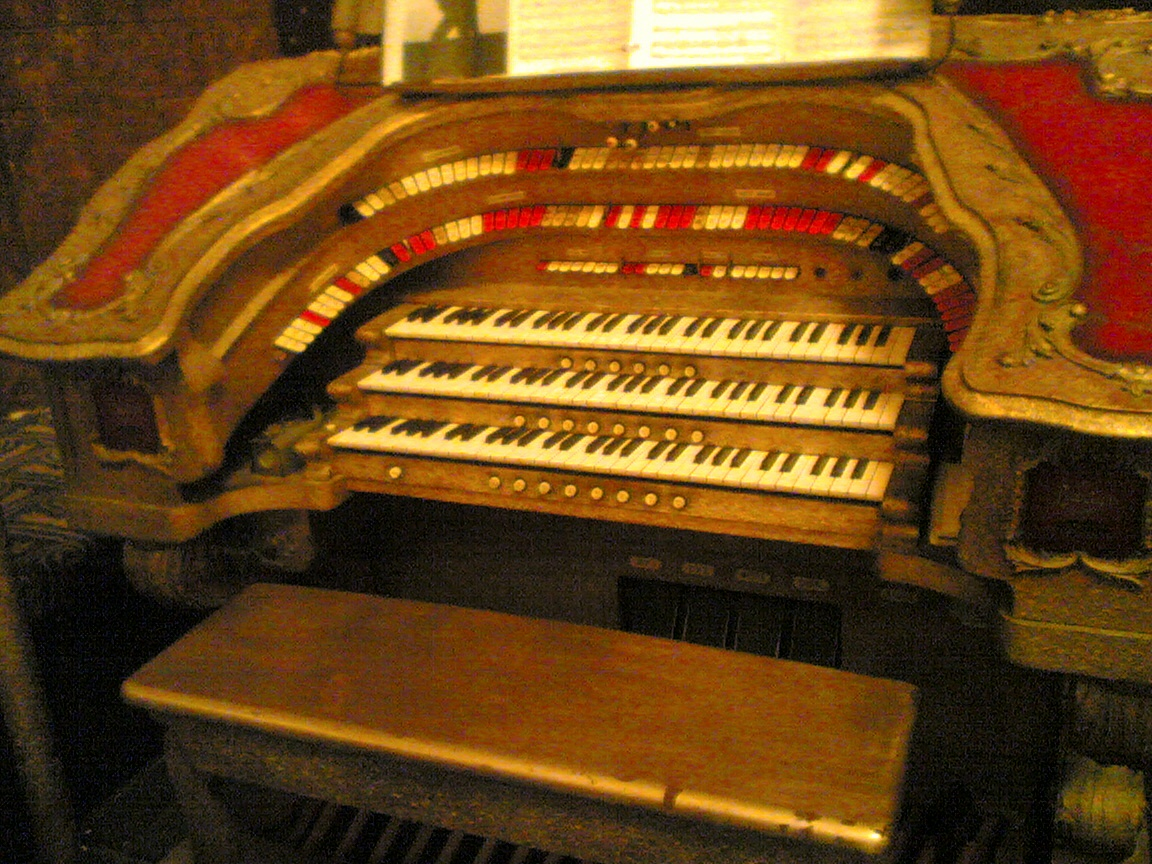
Console of the 3/13 Barton Theater Pipe Organ at Ann Arbor's Michigan Theater, showing Barton's special red and gold console decoration which came to be known as "circus wagon" style.

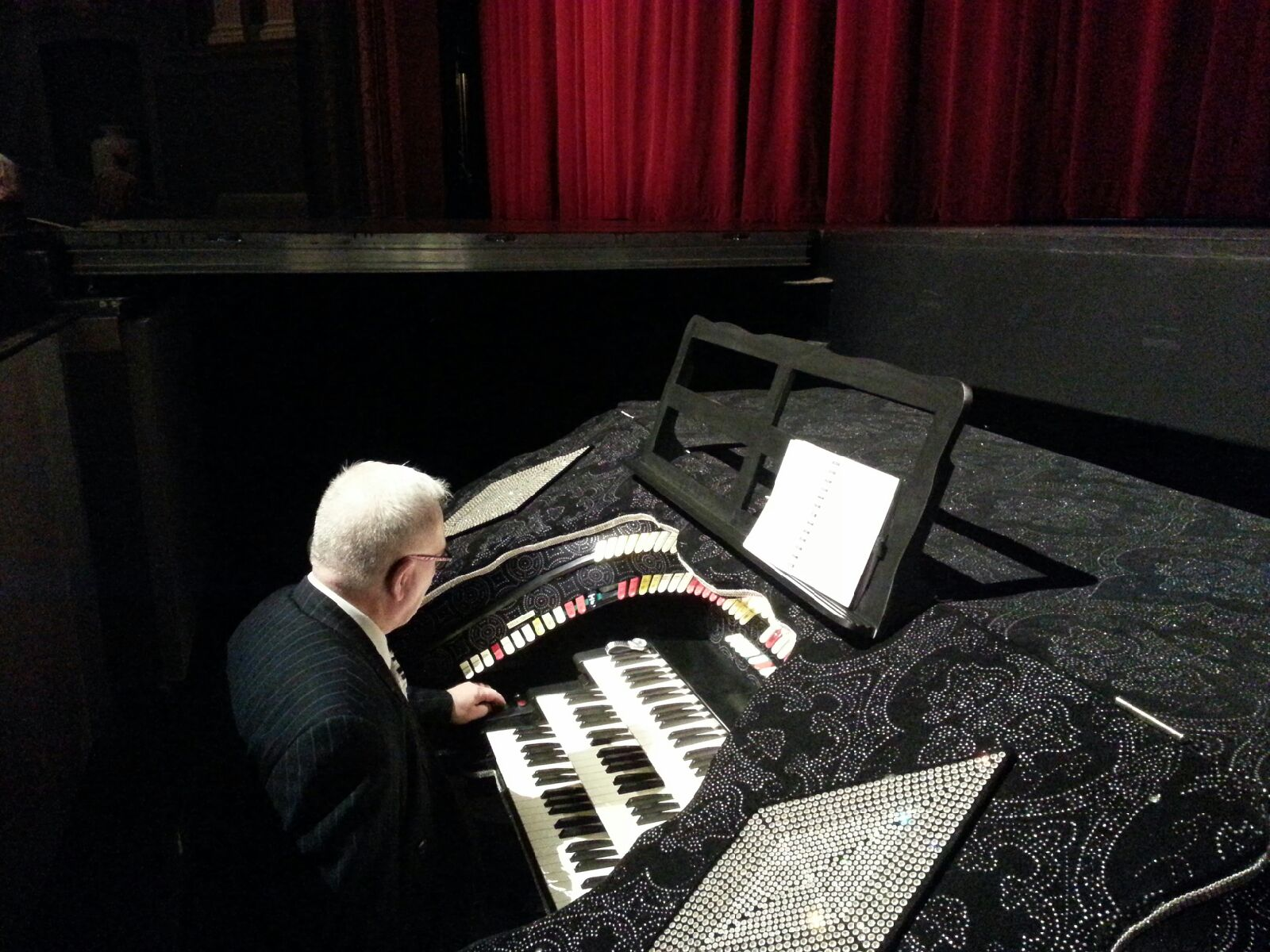
Spectacular console of the original installation 3 manual, 14 rank "Rhinestone Barton" theatre organ, installed in Theatre Cedar Rapids (the former RKO Iowa Theatre), Cedar Rapids, Iowa

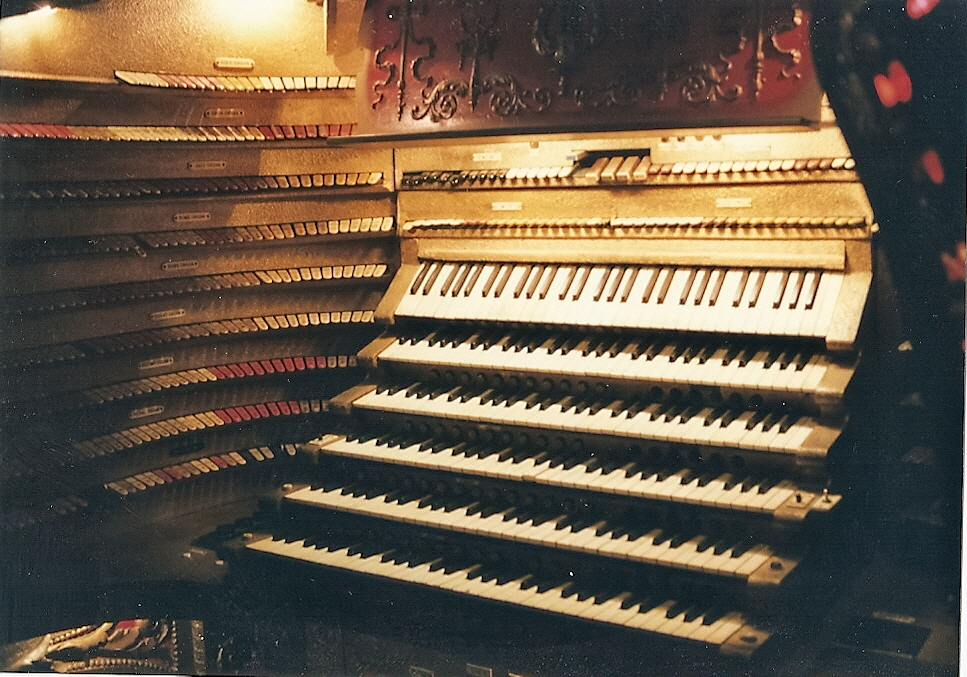
Detail of console of Barton organ originally installed in the Chicago Stadium, Chicago, Illinois. This was the largest console built by Bartola, and controlled the largest Barton organ ever built.

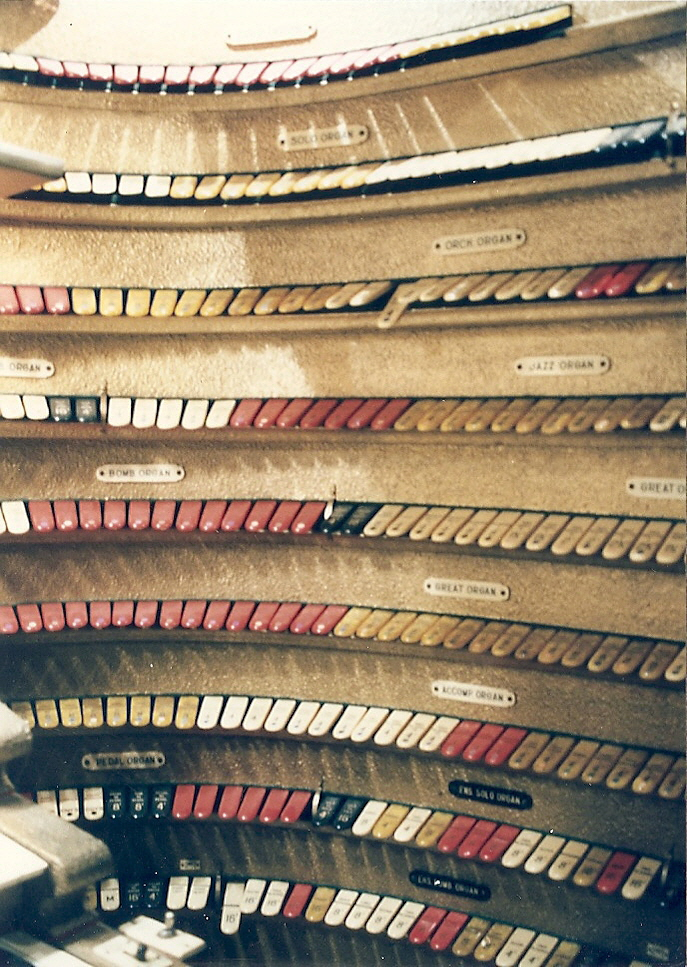
Detail of console of Barton organ originally installed in the Chicago Stadium, Chicago, Illinois, showing the massive quantity of stopkeys on the right side of console.

The Bartola Musical Instrument Company of Oshkosh, Wisconsin, United States, was a producer of theater pipe organs during the age of silent movies.

== History ==
The company was founded in 1918 by Dan Barton, who was from Amherst, Wisconsin. The sixth largest builder of theater instruments in the nation, Bartola focused almost exclusively on the Midwest market. Barton later recalled, "We decided to work only a limited territory so we could give prompt service to all our installations. [This territory included] Wisconsin, Illinois, Michigan, Iowa, Indiana and Ohio. No installation was more than an overnight sleeper ride from Chicago." For this reason, the instruments were almost unknown outside of this relatively small area until later years, long after manufacture had ceased, when many were moved from their original homes into venues around the United States. The company built about 250 theater organs from 1918 to 1931.

Barton's first successful experiment in producing equipment to accompany silent films was a set of electrically operated bells that formed a musical scale. Mounted around the interior of the theater, these were operated by the pit drummer who was performing foley and various other sound effects for the picture. After seeing the highly enthusiastic reception of his invention, Barton began toying with the idea of a more elaborate mechanism employing additional percussion instruments and organ pipes.

In 1918, the Bartola Musical Instrument Company was formed in Oshkosh, Wisconsin. Barton was assisted by Butch Littlefield and Walter Gollnick and was financed in the early days by a partner, W. G. Maxcy. Barton turned his attention to the development and manufacture of the "Bartola", one of several precursors of the theatre organ generically referred to as photoplayers. Like other photoplayers, the Bartola was designed around an upright piano, and consisted of several ranks of organ pipes and various percussion instruments and sound effects housed in a case, all installed in the theatre's orchestra pit. There were four models. The larger ones had several cases–one for organ pipe ranks and the other for percussions and sound effects. The traps and other percussions were powered directly by electric solenoids and not pneumatically as was the case with most other photoplayers. Also, while most other photoplayers were designed to play mechanically from a punched paper roll, the Bartola was equipped with a divided keyboard that could be swung in front of and above the piano's keyboard, enabling live performance by a musician. A footboard placed around the piano pedals was used to play the effects. The benefits of being able to tailor the music and sound effects to the action on the screen were obvious, and the Bartola was an immediate success.

In the early- to mid-1920s, larger and more opulent theaters were being built, and photoplayer-type instruments were no longer considered adequate to meet the musical demands of the larger houses. A new kind of organ was being developed, one which expanded greatly on the concept of the photoplayer. Originally developed by Robert Hope-Jones and marketed as the "Wurlitzer-Hope-Jones Unit Orchestra" by the Rudolph Wurlitzer Company of North Tonawanda, New York, it was designed specifically to meet the entertainment needs of theatres (most importantly the accompaniment of silent film). This new musical aesthetic, embraced and marketed by nearly every organ manufacturer then in business in the United States and the United Kingdom, resulted in an instrument which soon became generically known as the theatre organ. Barton gradually converted his operation from manufacture of the Bartola to the manufacture and installation of larger theatre pipe organs, just as the other manufacturers were doing, with pipes and other sound-producing components installed in organ chambers placed higher in the building, speaking directly into the auditorium, and with only the large organ console remaining in the orchestra pit. Along with its many competitors, this was the genesis of the "Barton Organ".

Wurlitzer was, in addition to being its inventor, the largest manufacturer of theatre organs by a considerable margin, so it is inevitable that Barton's products would be compared to that standard. The Barton organ was especially robust in construction and tonal design, was soundly constructed from quality materials, and worked exceptionally well. They have been described as "huskier" in construction and tone than were typical Wurlitzer organs, an apt description. Some consider the typical Barton sound to be "cruder" or "less refined" than the typical Wurlitzer sound, while others revel in its brash assertiveness.

Dan Barton was a savvy businessman who knew the importance of showmanship in show business. Bartola, arguably more than any other manufacturer of theatre organs, designed instruments that would appeal to the eye as well as the ear. Barton's consoles—the most visible part of the organ to the customer—were almost always vividly (one might even say "gaudily") decorated, with striking designs and colors. One common decoration scheme used brilliant red and gold (or black and gold) paint over gesso relief designs. This style of decoration eventually became informally referred to as the "circus wagon" motif.

The 1920s saw massive demand for theatre organs as more and more theatres devoted to exhibition of the motion picture were built, and orders for Barton organs poured in. This increased demand necessitated the outsourcing of some components—a practice common among theatre organ manufacturers at the time—and materials from component suppliers such as Dennison, Gottfried, Meyer, Wangerin, and Geneva have been identified within extant instruments. In its heyday, Barton had over 150 employees.

The largest Barton ever built was installed in the Chicago Stadium sports arena. The organ was installed in the center ceiling, and had 51 ranks of pipes of massive scale as well as the usual percussion, traps, and effects. The gaudy red and gold "circus wagon" console (perhaps the largest organ console ever built) was on prominent display on the arena's balcony, and boasted six manuals as well as over 800 stop tabs. The organ was powered by an immense 100 HP Spencer blower, and the sound of the organ (in the words of the reviewer of Marcel Dupré's 1929 dedicatory recital) was immense: "...It was as if even the most ardent lover of chocolate soda were hurled into a swimming pool filled with it..." In a probably apocryphal story, long-time stadium organist Al Melgard was reputed to have broken windows and light bulbs while executing a fortississimo rendition of the National Anthem, to quell a riot that had erupted at a boxing match. The organ was removed from the stadium and placed in storage before the building was torn down. Unfortunately much of the organ was destroyed in storage by fire in October 1996, although the huge, one-of-a-kind console, which had been stored elsewhere, was saved, and is now in a private collection in Nevada.

Another notable example is the "Rhinestone Barton", so named due to its unique and spectacular rhinestone-decorated console. This 3-manual, 14-rank organ was actually sub-contracted to, and built by, the Wangerin Company of Milwaukee, Wisconsin. It is located at Theatre Cedar Rapids (the former RKO Iowa Theatre) in downtown Cedar Rapids, and as far as is known, has the only organ console to have been decorated in this fashion.

Many theatres were equipped with organ lifts (elevators), designed to raise the organ console to stage level for solos, and lower it into the pit for film accompaniment. Bartola also manufactured organ lifts, recognizable by their distinctive four posts—one at each corner of the lift, and topped by metallic spheres. The posts concealed the lift mechanism, and Bartola's four-post lift was of great interest to small to mid-sized theater builders because it sat flat on the orchestra pit floor without requiring excavation below the pit, or even the drilling of a central screw shaft into the floor. Many Barton organ consoles were installed on these lifts, to say nothing of consoles of other builders. Like all Bartola products, they were robustly constructed, and many remain in use today. One example of this lift unit for the Barton organ may be found at the 1927-era historic Temple Theatre in Saginaw, Michigan.

In 1929 the company changed its name to the Maxcy Barton Organ Company, then ceased business operations about 1931, soon after the advent of "talking pictures" eliminated the demand for theatre organs virtually overnight.

Some church organs were also built by Bartola but were marketed as "Maxcy–Barton" organs to distance them from their gaudy theatre organ siblings. One noted Maxcy-Barton organ is a three manual instrument still in use at St. Mary Parish of Oshkosh, Wisconsin.

== Gallery ==
Barton organs
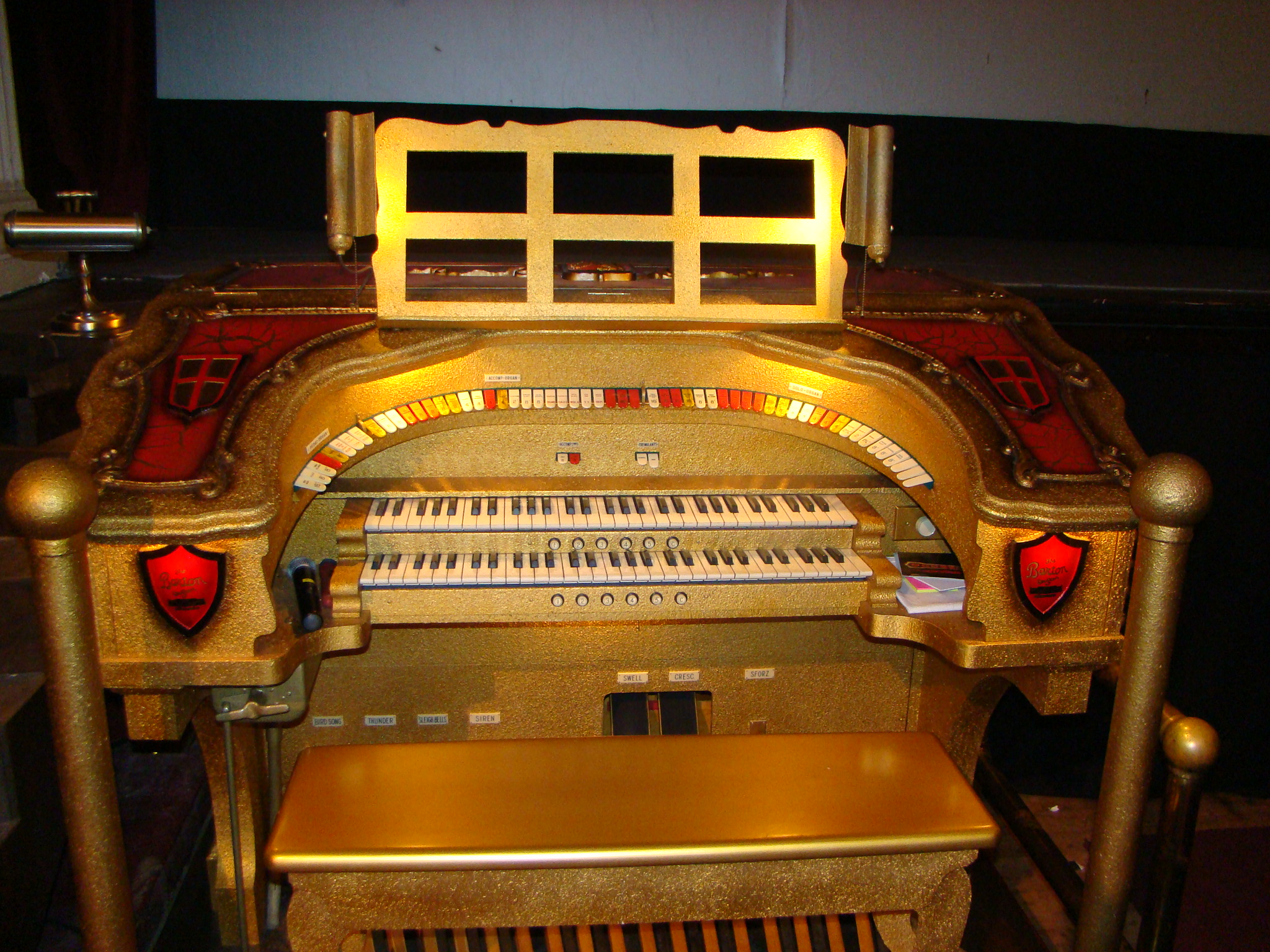
2/7 Barton, Ironwood Theatre, Opus 145

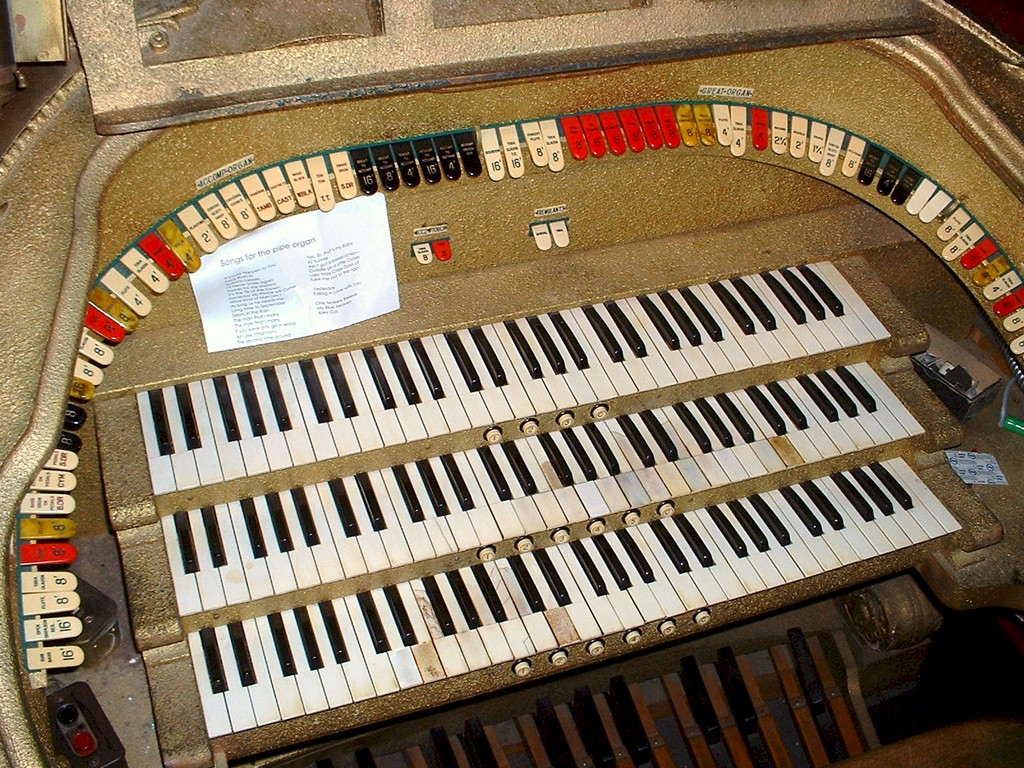
3/9 Barton, Al. Ringling Theatre

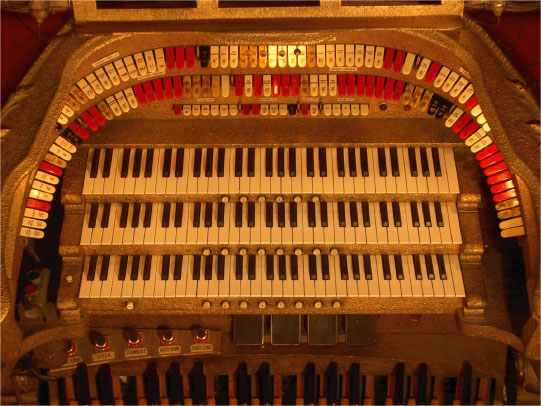
3/13 Barton, Michigan Theater

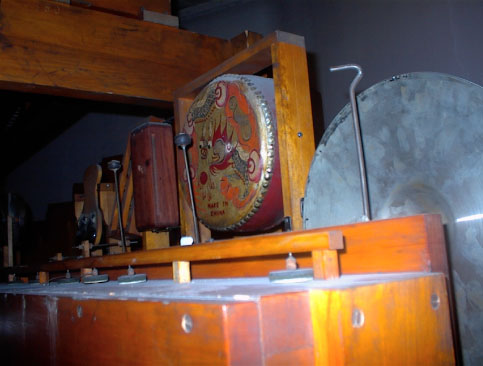
Percussions in the Solo Chamber at Ann Arbor's Michigan Theater.

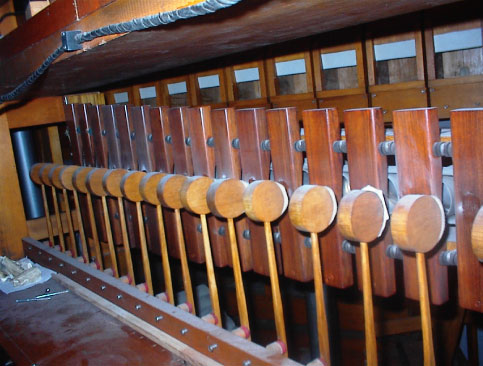
Marimba in the Solo Chamber at Ann Arbor's Michigan Theater.
