= Chicago Stadium =

Former indoor arena in Chicago, Illinois, U.S.

- "The Madhouse on Madison"; "The House That Paddy Built"
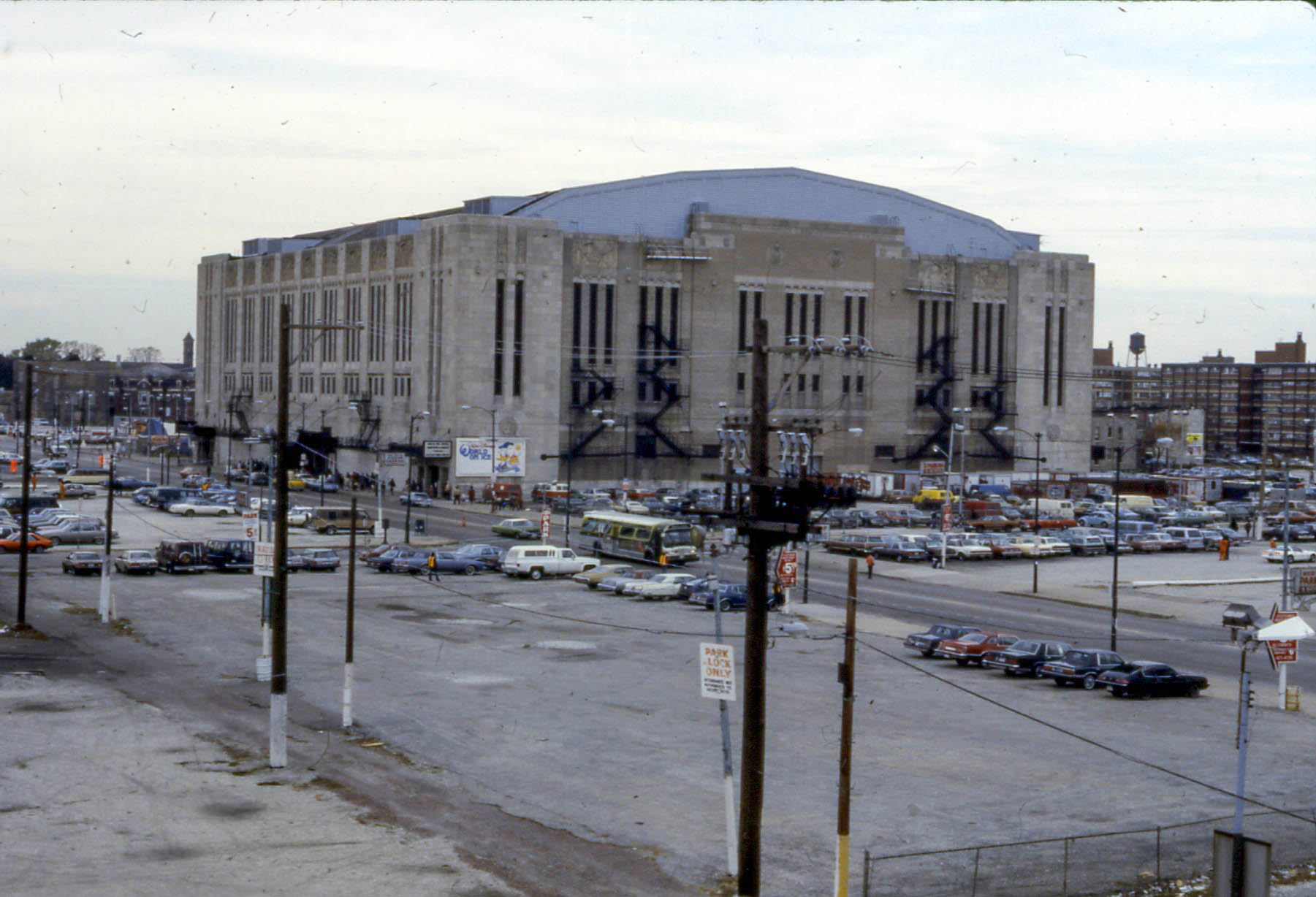
- Chicago Stadium in 1984, ten years before closure
- Interactive map of Chicago Stadium
- Address: 1800 West Madison Street; Chicago, Illinois; United States
- Coordinates: 41°52′54″N 87°40′22″W
- Owner: Chicago Stadium Corp.
- Operator: Chicago Stadium Corp.
- Capacity: 18,676 (basketball); 17,317 (ice hockey); 18,472 (ice hockey with standing room)

Construction
- Groundbreaking: July 2, 1928
- Opened: March 28, 1929
- Closed: September 9, 1994
- Demolished: February–May 1995
- Cost: $5–9.5 million (est.) ($178 million in 2025 dollars)
- Architects: Hall, Lawrence & Ratcliffe, Inc.
- Builder: Paddy Harmon

Tenants
- Chicago Blackhawks (NHL) (1929–1994); Chicago Stags (BAA/NBA) (1946–1950); Chicago Majors (ABL) (1961–1963); Chicago Bulls (NBA) (1967–1994); Chicago Sting (NASL/MISL) (1980–1988)

Chicago Stadium was an indoor arena in Chicago from 1929 to 1995, located at 1800 West Madison Street. When it was built, it was the largest indoor arena in the world with a maximum seating capacity of 26,000. It was the home of the National Hockey League's Chicago Blackhawks and the National Basketball Association's Chicago Bulls. It was used for numerous other sporting events, opening with a championship boxing match in March 1929. In sports, it gained the nickname, the "Madhouse on Madison", and a feature during events was the playing of the largest Barton pipe organ ever built. It also hosted five United States presidential nominating conventions, including for Franklin D. Roosevelt, and for his opponents in 1932 and 1944.

The Stadium was built by Paddy Harmon, a promoter, who sank his entire fortune into the project, only to lose control to the Stadium shareholders. After exiting receivership in 1935, the Stadium was owned by the Norris and Wirtz families until its closure in 1994 and demolition in 1995. It was replaced by the United Center built across the street, also owned substantially by the Wirtz family.

== History ==
The Stadium hosted the Chicago Blackhawks of the NHL from 1929 to 1994 and the Chicago Bulls of the NBA from 1967 to 1994. The arena was the site of the first NFL playoff game in 1932; the 1932, 1940, and 1944 Democratic National Conventions; and the 1932 and 1944 Republican National Conventions, as well as numerous concerts, rodeo competitions, boxing matches, political rallies, and plays.

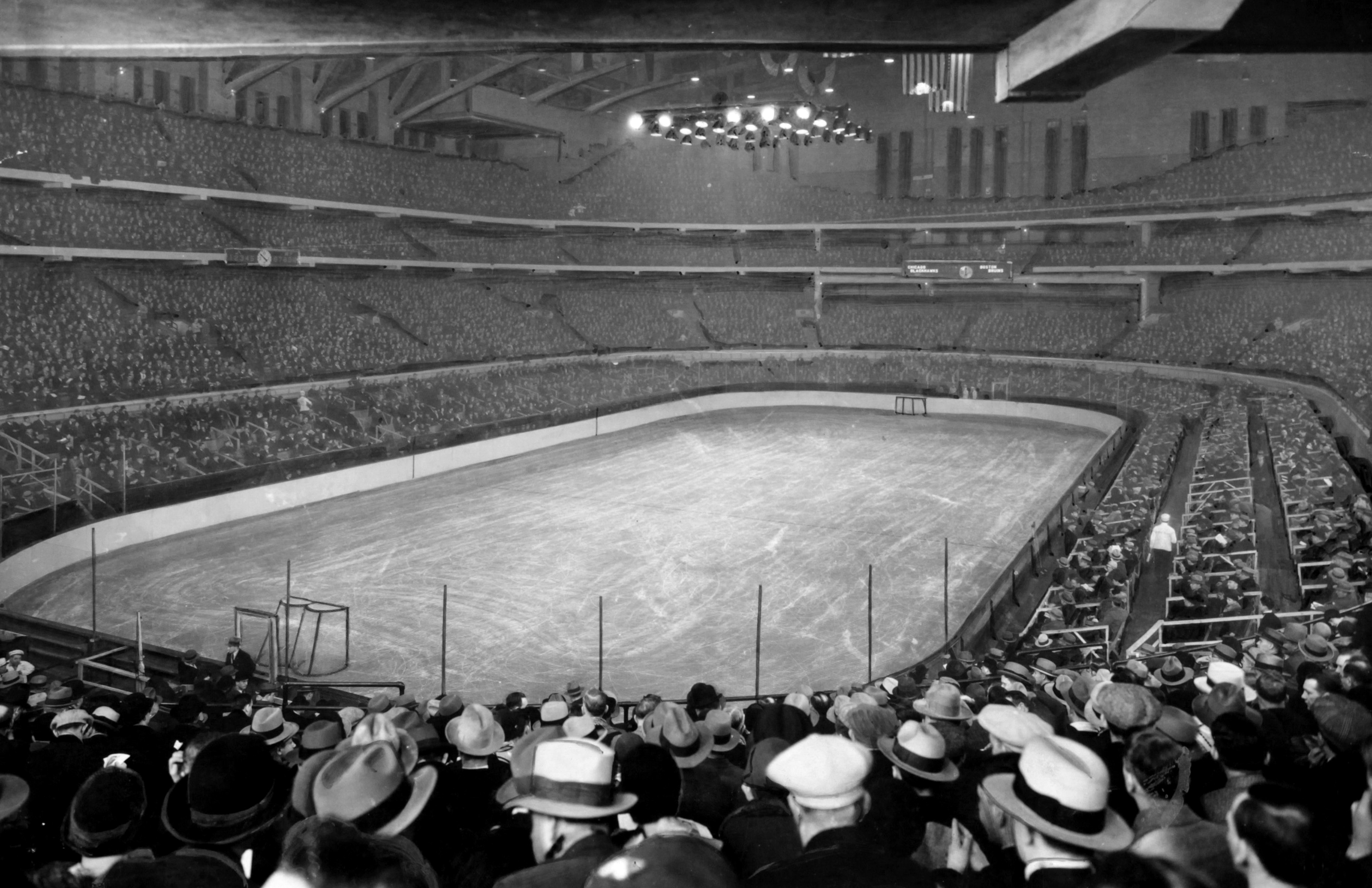
The interior of Chicago Stadium in February 1930, prior to a Blackhawks/Bruins game

The Stadium was built by Harmon, first proposed in 1926, not long after the legalization of professional boxing in Illinois. Encouraged by the success of the New York Rangers and New York Americans expansion NHL teams, and their Madison Square Garden, Harmon also wanted to bring an NHL team to Chicago, but he lost out to Col. Frederic McLaughlin. This team would soon be known as the Chicago Black Hawks (later 'Blackhawks'). With or without the Black Hawks, Harmon then spent $2.5 million and borrowed more funds from friends, including $600,000 from James E. Norris, in order to build the stadium. Eric Hall was the architect and he designed a stadium where all had a view of the action. His design philosophy was "The man who pays the lowest admission price has as much right to see the show as those who sit at the ringside". The building used Art Deco flourishes, including flattened columns, long vertical windows, relief sculptures of various athletics and medallions of wrestlers adorned the walls above entrances.

Breaking ground in July 1928, it opened eight months later, on March 28, 1929. Various reports give the cost at US$5 million, US$7 million and US$9,500,000 (equivalent to $178,125,000 in 2025). Chicago Stadium was the largest indoor arena in the world at the time, with permanent seating for 15,000 people, and a capacity for 26,000 with floor seats and standing room. It was situated in Harmon's old "Valley" neighbourhood where he grew up. Its first event was a boxing match between Tommy Loughran and Mickey Walker for a purse of US$150,000 (equivalent to $2,812,500 in 2025).

Detroit's Olympia stadium, built two years earlier, was a model for Chicago Stadium. The Stadium was also the first arena with an air conditioning system. However, the system was fairly rudimentary by modern standards, and was memorably given to filling the arena with fog during late-season basketball and hockey games. The Stadium also had no elevators. To get kegs of beer to upper-floor concessions, concession workers formed a line to pass the kegs upstairs. To return the kegs downstairs, the workers simply rolled them down the stairs, damaging the stairs in the process.

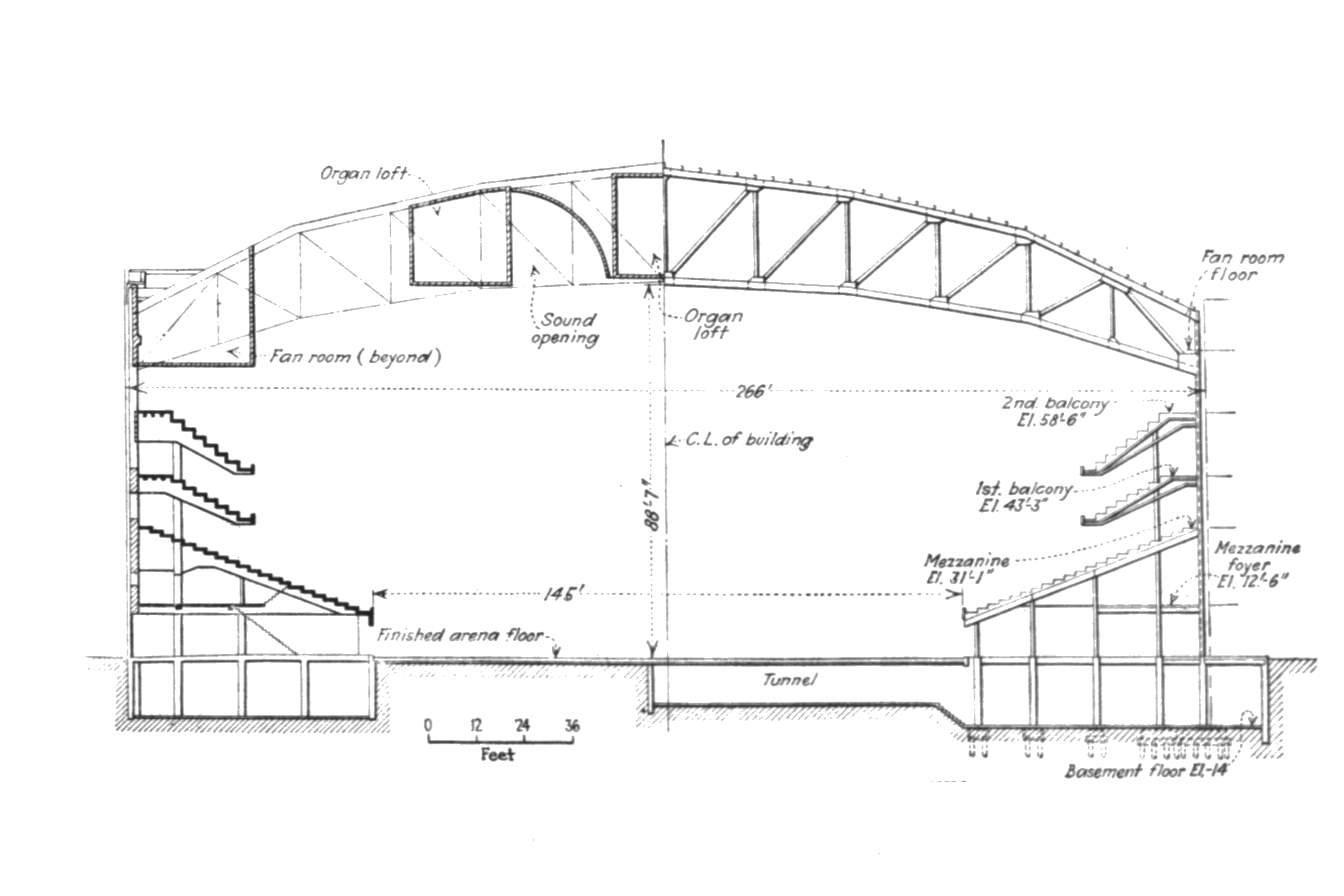
Sectional plan of the arena, showing the 266' span.

Harmon became the Stadium's first president. Building it incurred enemies. Harmon himself helped put out a fire on the Stadium's roof set by disgruntled workmen. Harmon reached an impasse in getting the Black Hawks as a tenant, although both sides wanted the team to move to the Stadium from the Chicago Coliseum, which was much smaller. Fed up with the delay, the Stadium board of directors forced Harmon to resign as president, although he remained an executive with the Stadium. Sheldon Clark became the new president, and he retained Nate Clark as the Stadium's boxing matchmaker. The board acceded to the Black Hawks' terms and the team moved in weeks later. After Harmon was ousted, dynamite was placed at the home of James Norris when Sidney Strotz, treasurer of the Stadium was attending for dinner. The dynamite's fuse went out, preventing its explosion.

Harmon sank his entire fortune into the Stadium, and when he died less than a year later due to a car crash, he had only his shares in the Stadium and $2.50 in cash on hand to leave to his widow and daughter. His funeral was held in the Stadium, paid for by friends, and the Stadium held a benefit boxing show in August 1930 to benefit his family.

Struggling to pay the interest on the Stadium's debt, the Stadium planned to turn the Stadium into a dog track for the summer of 1930 with the backing of Thomas Duggan, but dog racing was ruled illegal in Chicago. Al Capone had operated dog racing tracks in Cook County for several years before the authorities stopped his tracks from operating.

On January 20, 1933, the Stadium went into receivership. Sidney Strotz of the Stadium Corporation and Fred E. Hummel were named receivers. Strotz announced to the media that the Stadium would operate much like it had before. In 1935, the Stadium was sold to Norris and Arthur Wirtz, a Chicago real estate owner. Norris and Wirtz had in 1933 purchased the Detroit NHL franchise and the Detroit Olympia. By court judgment, control of the Stadium changed hands to Norris and Wirtz for a total of US$250,000 (equivalent to $5,870,752 in 2025), of which $150,000 went for back taxes, $50,000 for reorganization expenses, and $50,000 for new working capital.

=== Seating capacity ===
The Stadium sat 17,317 for hockey at the time of closure, though standing room pushed the "actual" attendance beyond that figure. The official attendance figures in the published game summaries were often given in round numbers, such as 18,500 or 20,000. The largest recorded crowd for an NHL game at the stadium was 20,960 for a playoff game between the Blackhawks and Minnesota North Stars on April 10, 1982.

Basketball
Years	Capacity
1929–1958	17,000
1958–1986	17,374
1986–1989	17,458
1989–1994	17,339
With standing room	18,676

Hockey
Years	Capacity
1929–1952	16,000
1952–1984	16,666
1984–1994	17,317
With standing room	18,472

== "The Madhouse on Madison" ==
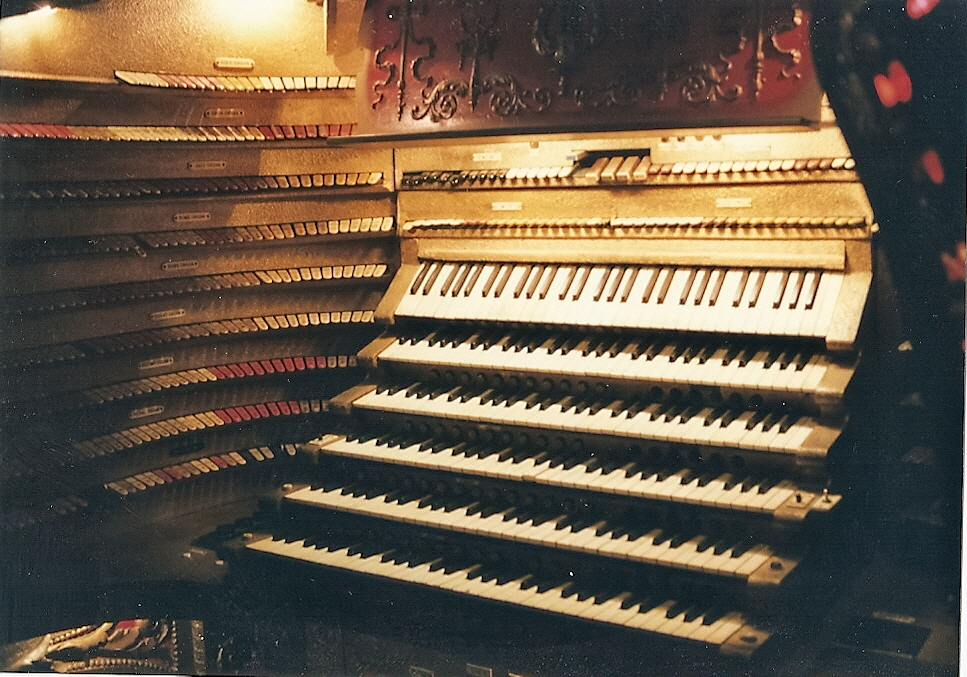
The Barton pipe organ originally installed in Chicago Stadium boasted six manuals (keyboards) and over 800 stops, with thousands of pipes and percussions installed in the center ceiling high above center court.

In addition to the close-quartered, triple-tiered, boxy layout of the building, much of the loud, ringing noise of the fans could be attributed to the fabled 3,663-pipe Barton organ. It was estimated to have the total volume of 25 brass bands. The organ was considered to have the world's largest theater organ console with six manuals (keyboards) and over 800 stops. It was Harmon's intention that the massive organ would be needed to provide the music for whatever event was playing in the building. It was played by Al Melgard for decades during hockey games there, earning the Stadium the moniker "The Madhouse on Madison".

For years, the Stadium was also known as "The Loudest Arena in the NBA", due to its barn-shaped features. When the Stadium closed in 1994, the organ was removed and prepared to be installed in the 19th hole museum. Soon after the museum closed, sending the organ along with another theatre organ to a warehouse in Phoenix, Arizona. In October 1996, a year after the stadium was razed, a propane tank explosion melted and destroyed both pipe organs, excluding the console. The organ is currently in the residence of Phil Maloof and is in good working condition with new pipes. As of July, 2026, the console is on display at the Musical Instrument Museum in Phoenix, Arizona.

In the Stanley Cup semifinals of 1971, when the Blackhawks scored a series-clinching empty-net goal in Game seven against the New York Rangers, CBS announcer Dan Kelly reported, "I can feel our broadcast booth shaking! That's the kind of place Chicago Stadium is right now!" The dressing rooms at the Stadium were placed underneath the seats, and the cramped corridor that led to the ice, with its twenty-two steps, became the stuff of legend. Legend has it a German Shepherd wandered the bowels at night as "the security team."

Chicago Stadium at Night, 1950 Curteich Linen Postcard

During the 1973 Stanley Cup Final against Montreal, Blackhawks owner Bill Wirtz had the horn of his yacht (Kahlenberg Q-3) installed in the building, and had it sound after Blackhawks goals. This practice would, in the ensuing years, become commonplace in professional hockey, as a "goal horn".

Nancy Faust, organist for 40 years at Chicago White Sox games, also played indoors at the Stadium, at courtside for Chicago Bulls home games from 1976 to 1984, and on the pipe organ for Chicago Blackhawks hockey there from 1985 to 1989. She was replaced at the keyboard in 1990 by Frank Pellico, who served as the Hawks' organist until 2025.

It also became traditional for Blackhawk fans to cheer loudly throughout the singing of the national anthems, especially when sung by Chicago favorite Wayne Messmer. Denizens of the second balcony often added sparklers and flags to the occasion. Many fans consider the most memorable of these to be the singing before the 1991 NHL All-Star Game, which took place during the Gulf War. This tradition has continued at the United Center. Longtime PA announcer Harvey Wittenberg had a unique monotone style: "Blackhawk goal scored by #9, Bobby Hull, unassisted, at 6:13." On the west side of the building was the Players/Employee/VIP Visitors Parking Lot. It is also where Teams/Bands/Politicians/Performers would enter the building through Gate 3 1/2 (Appropriately placed between Gates 3 and 4 on the North and South Sides). Although protected by fencing, it was where fans could see the celebrities get out of their cars or teams exit their buses before going into the building. It was also a great autograph and informal "meet and greet" opportunity.

The mid-1980s saw the beginning of a famous tradition for Bulls games at Chicago Stadium. Then-public address announcer Tommy Edwards would introduce the team's starting lineup, accompanied by spotlights amid a darkened stadium, and the playing of "Sirius" by The Alan Parsons Project. This trademark introduction would continue under Edwards' successor Ray Clay, and soon became synonymous with the Bulls' 1990s dynasty with Michael Jordan, Scottie Pippen and head coach Phil Jackson. During this period, the Bulls ceased using the organ in favor of recorded music in-game.

In 1992, both the Blackhawks and the Bulls reached the finals in their respective leagues. The Blackhawks were swept in their finals by the Pittsburgh Penguins, losing at Chicago Stadium, while the Bulls won the second of three straight NBA titles, the first on their home floor, against the Portland Trail Blazers. The next time the Bulls clinched the championship at home was in the newly built United Center in 1996 (when they did so against the Seattle SuperSonics), their second season at the new arena, and the Blackhawks would not reach the Stanley Cup Finals again until 2010 (in which they defeated the Philadelphia Flyers in six games), their 16th season in the new building, although they won their first championship since 1961 in Philadelphia. The Blackhawks last won the Stanley Cup at the Stadium in 1938; they did not win the Cup again at home until 2015 at the United Center.

=== Last analog game clock in any NHL arena ===
It was also the last NHL arena to retain the use of an analog dial-type large four-sided clock for timekeeping in professional hockey games. Boston Garden and the Detroit Olympia (as well as the Buffalo Memorial Auditorium in its pre-NHL days) had identical scoreboards but replaced them with digital timers in the mid-1960s, with Boston having their digital four-sided clock in use for the 1969–70 NHL season. After removing the balcony-edge game clocks at either end and at mid-ice zones of the Stadium, the replacement four-sided game clock suspended over center ice of the Stadium, built by Bulova as their "Sports Timer", was installed in Chicago in 1943. Each side of the clock had a large diameter 20-minute face in the center that kept the main game time for one period of ice hockey, with a set of shorter black-colored minute and longer red-colored sweep-second hands, and a pair of smaller, 5-minute capacity dual-concentric faces for penalty timekeeping, to the left and right of the primary 20-minute face—with each of the 5-minute penalty timers having its own single hand and each clock face, both the central main timer's dial and flanking penalty timer dials (when a penalty was counting down) illuminated from behind during gameplay. The "outer" face of each penalty timer had a single hand that avoided obscuration of the "inner" face and its own, "solid" single hand, through the use of metal rods forming the outer hand's "shaft", holding its hand's "pointer" head—the set of two concentric faces for each penalty timer dial could handle two penalties for each set, with an illuminated "2" on each penalty timer dial lighting up to display a minor penalty infraction. It was difficult to read how much time was left in a period of play on the main game timer's large face, as each minute of play was marked by a longer line on every third "seconds" increment on the central main dial, due to the minute hand's twenty-minute "full rotation" timing capacity for one period of ice hockey. The difficulty was compounded on the main central dial from the aforementioned minute and sweep-second hands being in constant motion during gameplay. The "Sports Timer's" only digital displays were for scoring and for penalized players' numbers, each digit comprising a six-high, four-wide incandescent light dot matrix display.

That clock eventually was replaced by a four-sided scoreboard with a digital clock, first used on September 21, 1975, in Blackhawks preseason play, crafted by the Day Sign Company of Toronto, much like the one used at the end of the 1960s (and constructed by Day Sign Company) to replace the nearly identical Bulova Sports Timer game-timekeeping device in the Boston Garden, and then in 1985 by another, this one with a color electronic message board. That latter scoreboard was built by White Way Sign, which would build scoreboards for the United Center.

The Stadium was also one of the last three NHL arenas (the others being Boston Garden and the Buffalo Memorial Auditorium) to have a shorter-than-regulation ice surface, as their construction predated the regulation. The distance was taken out of the neutral zone.

== Demolition ==
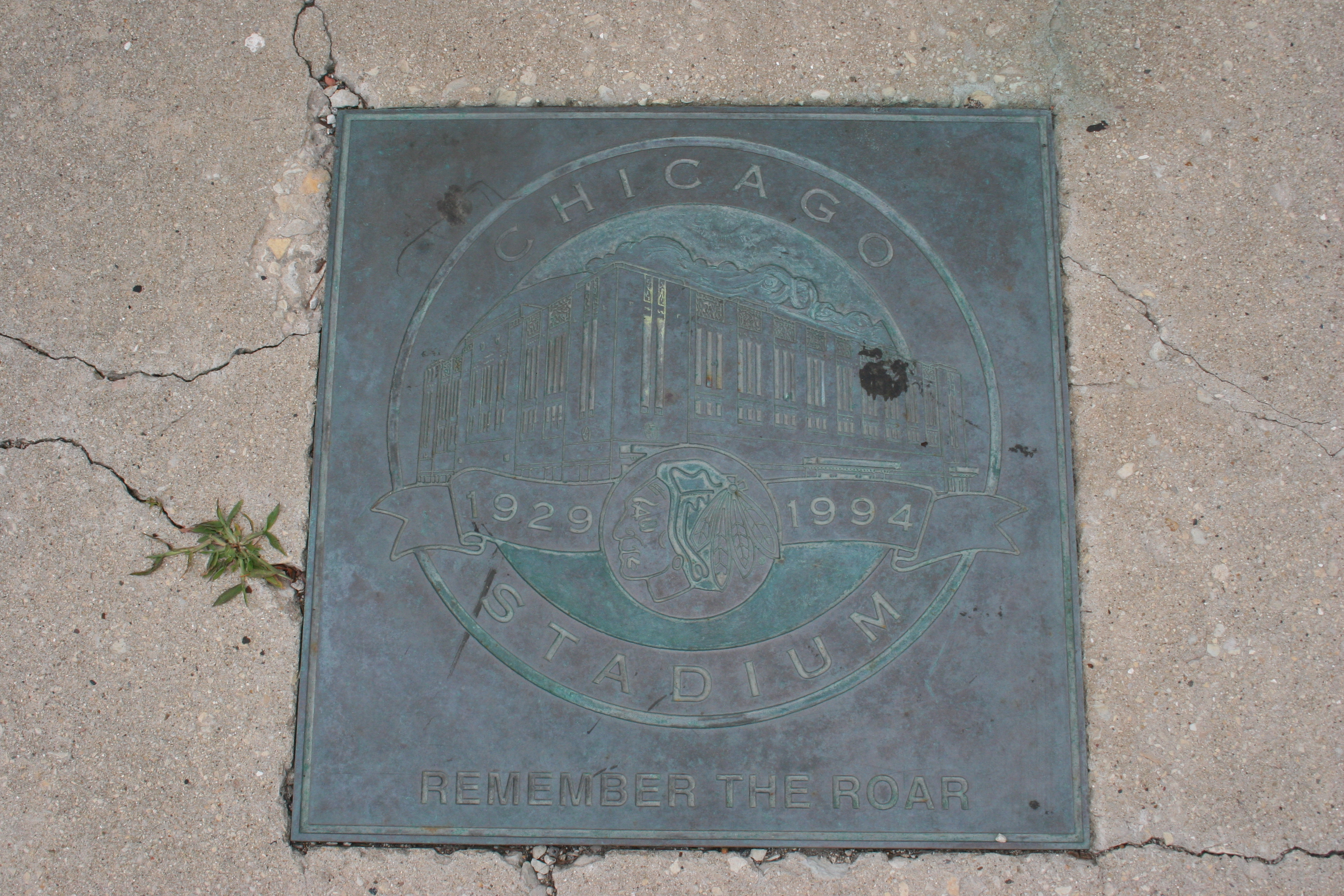
Commemorative plaque in the pavement on the north side of Madison Street

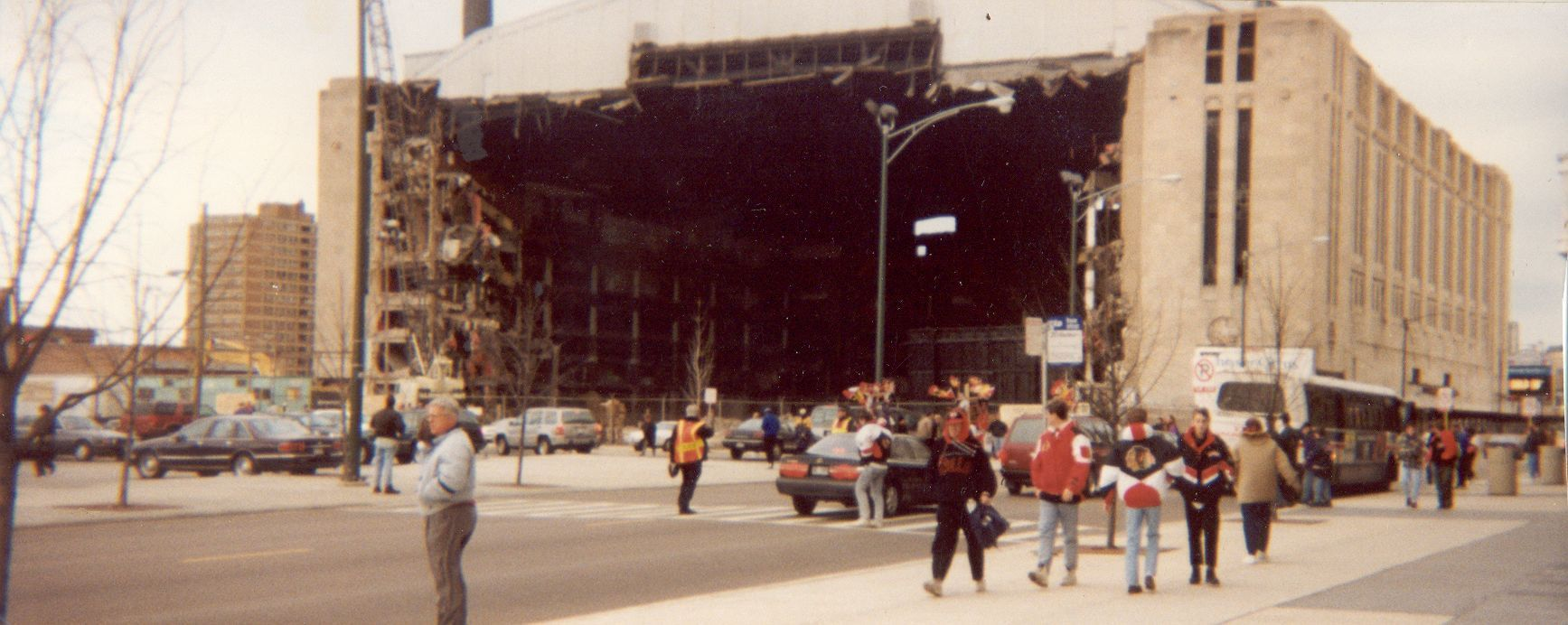
Chicago Stadium mid-demolition, March 1995

After the Blackhawks and Bulls moved to the United Center, Chicago Stadium was demolished in 1995. Its site is now a parking lot for the United Center across the street. CNN televised the demolition, showing devoted Blackhawks and Bulls fans crying as the wrecking ball hit the old building. The console of the Barton organ now resides in the Phil Maloof residence in Las Vegas, Nevada. Also, the center of the Chicago Bulls' floor resides in Michael Jordan's trophy room at his mansion in North Carolina.

A pavement plaque with the words "Chicago Stadium – 1929–1994 – Remember The Roar" is located behind a statue of the Blackhawks' greatest players on the north side of the United Center. Two friezes from Chicago Stadium were incorporated into a building at St. Ignatius College Prep School, 1076 W. Roosevelt Road.

Two of the Stadium's main parking lots, which are still used for United Center parking, previously retained signs that read "People's Stadium Parking".

== Events ==
Bulldogging photo of Cowboy Morgan Evans at the late 1920s Tex Austin Rodeo in Chicago Stadium

=== Basketball ===
- 1973, 1988: Chicago was the host city for the NBA All-Star Game.
- 1987: Michael Jordan of the Chicago Bulls scored 61 points on April 16 to become the only NBA player other than Wilt Chamberlain to top 3,000 points in a single season.
- 1991: Chicago Bulls won their first championship.
- 1992: Great Midwest Conference men's basketball tournament.
- 1992: Chicago Bulls won the second of three straight NBA titles in Game 6 of the NBA Finals. This would be the only time the Bulls clinched the championship while playing on the Stadium's floor, though they did it twice at the new United Center (in 1996 and again in 1997).
- 1993: Chicago Bulls won their third championship.
- 1994: The final Bulls home game at Chicago Stadium was played on May 20, a 93-79 Bulls win over the New York Knicks in game 6 of the Eastern Conference semifinals (the team would lose game 7 at Madison Square Garden in New York City).
- 1994: The final event at Chicago Stadium was Scottie Pippen's Ameritech Classic charity basketball game, which was organized through Reverend Jesse Jackson's Push-Excel program and was held on September 9, 1994. Michael Jordan, despite being in retirement at the time (he would return to basketball six months later), participated and scored 52 points, leading the White team to a 187–150 victory over Pippen's Red team. At the end of the game, Jordan kneeled and kissed the Bulls logo at center court.

=== Hockey ===
- 1934: The Blackhawks win the Stanley Cup on home ice by defeating the Detroit Red Wings 1–0 in the second overtime in game four of the Stanley Cup Final.
- 1938: The Blackhawks win the Stanley Cup on home ice by defeating the Toronto Maple Leafs 4–1 in game four of the Stanley Cup Final. This was the Blackhawks' last Stanley Cup win in Chicago Stadium.
- 1961: Bobby Hull scored twice in Game 1 of the Stanley Cup Final, won 3–2 by the Chicago Blackhawks over the Detroit Red Wings. The Blackhawks would go on to win the Stanley Cup at Detroit's Olympia Stadium, winning the series 4–2. Later, the team made it to the Final five more times (1962, 1965, 1971, 1973, and 1992), but they lost in all those series.
- 1961, 1974 and 1991: Stadium was host for the NHL All-Star Game.
- 1992: The last Stanley Cup Final game at Chicago Stadium was played on June 1. The Pittsburgh Penguins swept the series 4–0 and won game 4 6–5, capturing their second consecutive Stanley Cup.
- 1994: The final ice hockey game at Chicago Stadium was played on April 28. The Blackhawks lost to the Toronto Maple Leafs 1–0, eliminating them from the first round of the 1994 Stanley Cup playoffs. The only goal in the game, and last goal ever scored, came from Mike Gartner in the first period.

=== Football ===
- 1932: Due to a snowstorm followed by frigid temperatures, the Chicago Bears played the 1932 NFL championship game inside Chicago Stadium against the Portsmouth Spartans (later the Detroit Lions). The Bears won 9–0.

=== Soccer ===
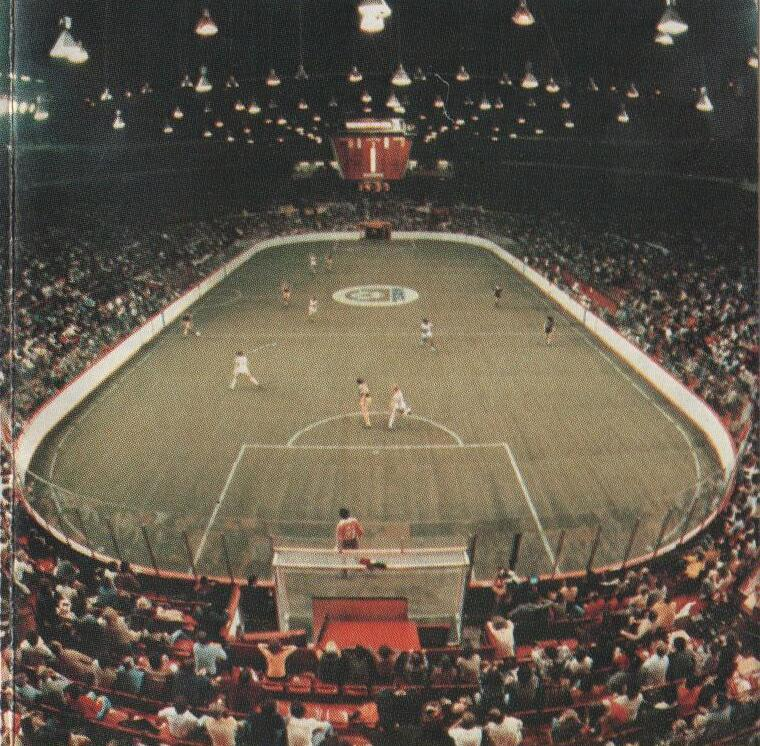
A Chicago Sting home game at Chicago Stadium, circa 1982

- 1984: The NASL held the only All-Star game ever played in its 17 outdoor and 4 indoor seasons. The All Stars defeat the host Chicago Sting 9–8 before 14,328 fans.

=== Boxing ===
- 1929: Stadium opened with bout between Tommy Loughran and Mickey Walker on March 28.
- 1943: Lee Savold scored three consecutive knockouts. Nate Bolden in January, Lem Franklin in February and April. 13,000 fans at third match against Franklin.
- 1947: Often cited as one of the great bouts of the 20th Century, Rocky Graziano scored a sixth-round technical knockout of Tony Zale before 18,547 on July 16, 1947.
- 1951: In their sixth and final fight, Sugar Ray Robinson defeated Jake LaMotta on Valentine's Day with a 13th-round TKO.
- 1953: Undefeated heavyweight champion Rocky Marciano knocked out Jersey Joe Walcott on May 15 in the first round.

=== Concerts ===
- 1972: June 16-17: Elvis Presley He played 3 shows, afternoon and evening on the 17th
- 1972: November 10–11: Jethro Tull
- 1974: January 3–4: Bob Dylan with the Band
- 1974: May 11: Grand Funk Railroad with Wet Willie
- 1974: November 1–2: Elton John Caribou Tour with Kiki Dee
- 1975: April 01 Alice Cooper Welcome to My Nightmare Tour with Suzi Quatro
- 1975: June 1–5 & 7th: Beach Boys and Chicago (Beachago Tour).
- 1975: Santana's Borboletta Tour came here on July 5.
- 1975: The Rolling Stones' Tour of the Americas '75 stopped here July 22–24.
- 1975: The Who performed here on December 4–5 during their 1975 tour.
- 1975–76: December 31-January 1: Frank Sinatra met the new year in Chicago Stadium, performing a concert with 23 songs.
- 1976: Paul McCartney's first three concerts in Chicago in 10 years; he performed May 31 through June 2 in his Wings Over America Tour.
- 1977-78: Queen, 3 concerts: A Day at the Races Tour - January 28, 1977 with Special Guest Thin Lizzy, News of the World Tour - December 5, 1977, Jazz Tour - December 7, 1978
- 1977: In the spring of 1977, Led Zeppelin played four shows here during their final North American tour (they had previously played three concerts at this venue on their 1975 North American Tour and two concerts on their 1973 North American Tour). Two more were scheduled for later in the tour but were cancelled due to the death of Robert Plant's son. Tickets from the cancelled partial show on April 9 were to be honored at the rescheduled shows, which never materialized. (The band was booked to perform four concerts at the stadium as part of another North American tour in November 1980, but the tour was officially cancelled on September 27, two days after John Bonham's death.)
- 1977: Elvis Presley's last concert in Chicago was in the Stadium on May 1–2.
- 1977: Fleetwood Mac, July 23–24
- 1977: Steve Miller Band with Boz Scaggs, October 1977
- 1978: Bob Seger with The Sweet, March 1978
- 1978: Ted Nugent April 29, 1978
- 1978: Billy Joel October 13, 1978. For his 52nd Street Tour.
- 1978: Bob Seger with The Rockets and Joe Cocker December 1, 1978
- 1979: The Bee Gees performed two sold-out shows during their Spirits Having Flown Tour on July 30–31.
- 1979-81: Michael Jackson and his brothers performed in the Stadium during their Destiny Tour on November 2, 1979, and their Triumph Tour on August 28, 1981.
- 1981: November 5, Electric Light Orchestra with opening act Hall & Oates.
- 1994: The final concert was held on March 10, featuring Pearl Jam, Urge Overkill and The Frogs.

=== In film ===
- 1961: Scenes from the 1962 version of The Manchurian Candidate depicting the Republican nomination convention, were filmed in the stadium. The scenes are set in New York's Madison Square Garden.

=== Other events ===
- 1930: Funeral of Stadium builder Paddy Harmon, benefit boxing match for Harmon's widow and children.
- 1932, 1940 and 1944: Democratic National Conventions, at which Franklin D. Roosevelt won his first, third and fourth nominations from the Democratic Party for President of the United States.
- 1932 and 1944: Republican National Conventions, at which Herbert C. Hoover and Thomas E. Dewey, respectively, would win the Republican Party's nomination for President of the United States. Both lost to Roosevelt.
- 1933: Funeral of Chicago mayor Anton J. Cermak, the sole fatality in an assassination attempt on President-elect Franklin Roosevelt.
- 1936: Presidential election rallies for both Republican Alfred Landon and Democrat Franklin D. Roosevelt. Roosevelt's rally drew a crowd of over 1 million, with more than 200,000 attendees overwhelming the stadium's capacity of 25,000.
- 1946: While waiting in a backstage area to go onto the arena floor during a rodeo, Roy Rogers proposed to Dale Evans.
- 1968: Months after winning a 1968 Winter Olympics gold medal, Peggy Fleming drew large crowds to the Stadium with the Ice Capades.
- 1969: In a joint venture between NBC and Walt Disney Productions, Disney on Parade launched on December 25.

== See also ==
- Ray Clay – Former Bulls public address announcer

Events and tenants
Preceded by Chicago Coliseum	Home of the Chicago Blackhawks; 1929–1994	Succeeded by United Center
Preceded by Maple Leaf Gardens; Montreal Forum; Madison Square Garden; Pittsburgh Civic Arena	Host of the NHL All-Star Game; 1948; 1961; 1974; 1991	Succeeded by Maple Leaf Gardens; Maple Leaf Gardens; Montreal Forum; Philadelphia Spectrum
Preceded by International Amphitheatre	Home of the Chicago Bulls; 1967–1994	Succeeded by United Center
Preceded by The Forum; Kingdome	Host of the NBA All-Star Game; 1973; 1988	Succeeded by Seattle Center Coliseum; Astrodome
