= Al Melgard =

American organist (1890–1977)

Al Melgard (October 4, 1890 in Denmark – June 18, 1977) was an organist for the Chicago Stadium, from 1930 until he retired in 1974.

== Career ==
Melgard, who lost his left index finger in an accident as a child, played the Stadium's Barton theater organ masterfully. He played at nearly two thousand Chicago Blackhawks hockey games and over four hundred Chicago Bulls basketball games, and hundreds of professional boxing matches.

== Personal life ==
Melgard was born in Denmark. Hs family moved to Chicago when he was six months of age. He grew up in the city and attended Hyde Park High School there.

After retiring, Melgard moved to Las Vegas and died in 1977 at the age of 86.
