= Strand Theatre and Arcade =

- U.S. National Register of Historic Places
- Michigan State Historic Site
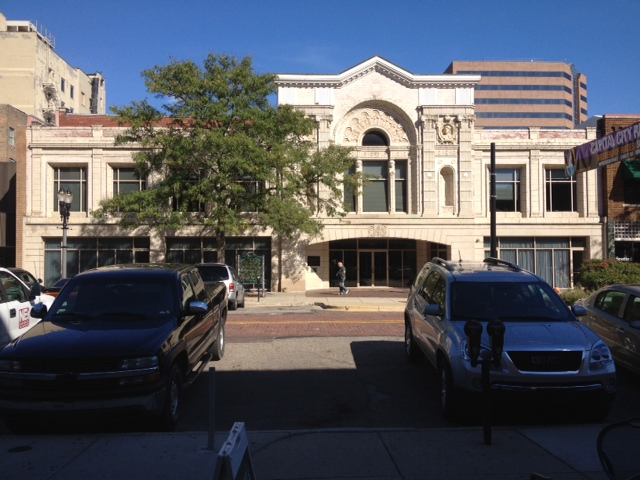
- Interactive map
- Location: 211-219 S. Washington Ave., Lansing, Michigan
- Coordinates: 42°43′55″N 84°33′05″W
- Area: less than one acre
- Built: 1920
- Architect: John Eberson
- Architectural style: Art Deco, Renaissance Revival
- MPS: Downtown Lansing MRA
- NRHP reference No.: 80001871
- Added to NRHP: September 17, 1980

The Strand Theatre and Arcade, also known as the Michigan Theatre and Arcade, is a former theatre building located at 211–219 South Washington Avenue in Lansing, Michigan. It was listed on the National Register of Historic Places in 1980.

== History ==
In 1920, theater entrepreneur Walter Scott Butterfield commissioned architect John Eberson to design this theatre. Construction began in 1920 and was completed in 1921. The theatre originally seated 1750 people, and the Butterfield circuit promoted it as a vaudeville and stage venue. Acts appearing at the Strand included Al Jolson, Harry Houdini, Will Rogers, Marian Anderson, and Bing Crosby. However, by mid-1922, movies substantially replaced the live acts. In 1941, the building was extensively remodeled, adding Art Deco elements to the theatre facade, and renamed the Michigan Theatre. It closed as a movie house in 1980 and remained vacant for a number of years.

In the early '80s, there was a partially successful campaign to save the theatre from demolition. In 1984, the building was redeveloped and converted into a mixed-use office and retail complex known as the Atrium Office Center. The exterior Art Deco elements were removed, and the facade returned to its original look. The rehabilitation focused on the atrium and the theatre lobby, and the auditorium portion was razed.

== Description ==
The Strand Theatre and Arcade is a large commercial red brick structure containing both a theatre and a two-story arcade. It is decorated with terra cotta, with Art Deco elements from the 1941 remodel. The facade is 109 feet wide, and two stories high, with a three-story gabled block over the center entrance. The entrance leads to a two-story, 20-foot-wide arcade, flanked with shops on the first floor and office space on the second. In the back, where the auditorium used to be, are the remains of the balcony seating, which now serves as the roof.
