= Maltz Opera House =

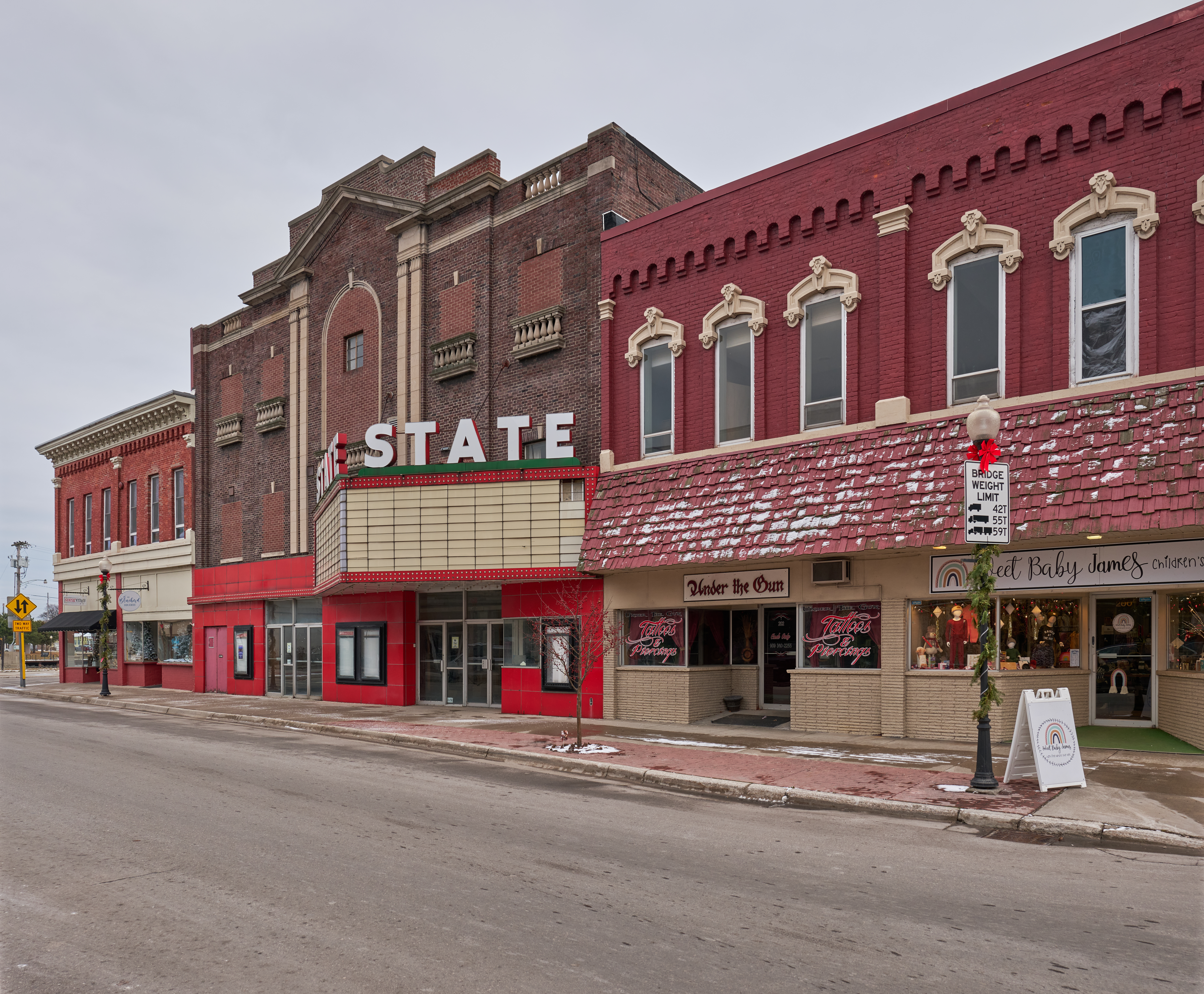
- The theater in 2024
- Interactive map of Maltz Opera House
- Former names: AMC Classic State 3 (2017–2020); Carmike State Cinemas (2005–2017); GKC State Cinemas (1990–2005); State Theater (1955–1990); Maltz Theater (1925–1955)
- Address: 206 North 2nd Avenue; Alpena, Michigan; United States
- Coordinates: 45°3′46.415″N 83°25′56.237″W

Construction
- Groundbreaking: 1876
- Opened: November 11, 1879; 146 years ago
- Rebuilt: 1925

The Maltz Opera House is a theater in Alpena, Michigan, named after Alpena banker George L. Maltz. The Maltz is currently under restoration to its 1930s-era appearance, and is expected to be listed on the National Register of Historic Places.

The original Maltz Opera House opened on November 11, 1879, and burned down in 1925. The rebuilt Maltz, renamed the State in 1955, was later operated by W.S. Butterfield Theatres, Carmike Cinemas, and AMC Theatres.

AMC closed the State in 2020 due to the COVID-19 pandemic. The State was purchased in 2021 by Jeff and Tina Konczak of Alpena, and renovations are in progress as of 2023. The Konczak family intends to reopen the theater as a live performance venue.

== Original Maltz Opera House ==
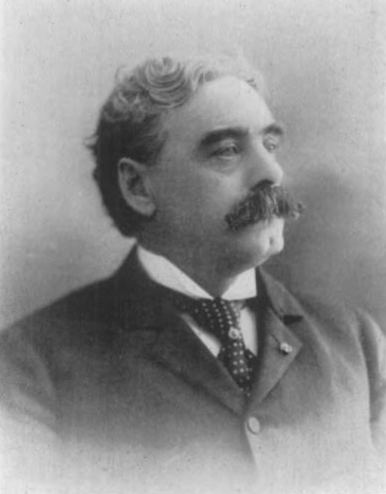
George L. Maltz, namesake

The Maltz' namesake, George L. Maltz, was a respected citizen of Alpena in the late 19th century. Maltz was born in Brooklyn and moved to Detroit in 1846, and later served in the Civil War in the Fourth Michigan Infantry. Maltz moved to Alpena in 1872, founded a major bank in the region, and served as Mayor of Alpena from 1873 to 1875. After the construction of the Opera House, Maltz served as Michigan State Treasurer, and later served on the Board of Regents of the University of Michigan.

The Maltz Opera House began construction in 1876, and opened in 1879 as part of the larger Maltz Block. The 832-seat theater was located on the second floor of the building, and featured a 52-volt electrical system and ten complete sets of scenery.

The original Maltz Opera House was extensively renovated around 1924. The block burned down only months later in January 1925, causing $150,000 ($2.8 million in 2025) in damage.

== Maltz Theater and State Theater ==
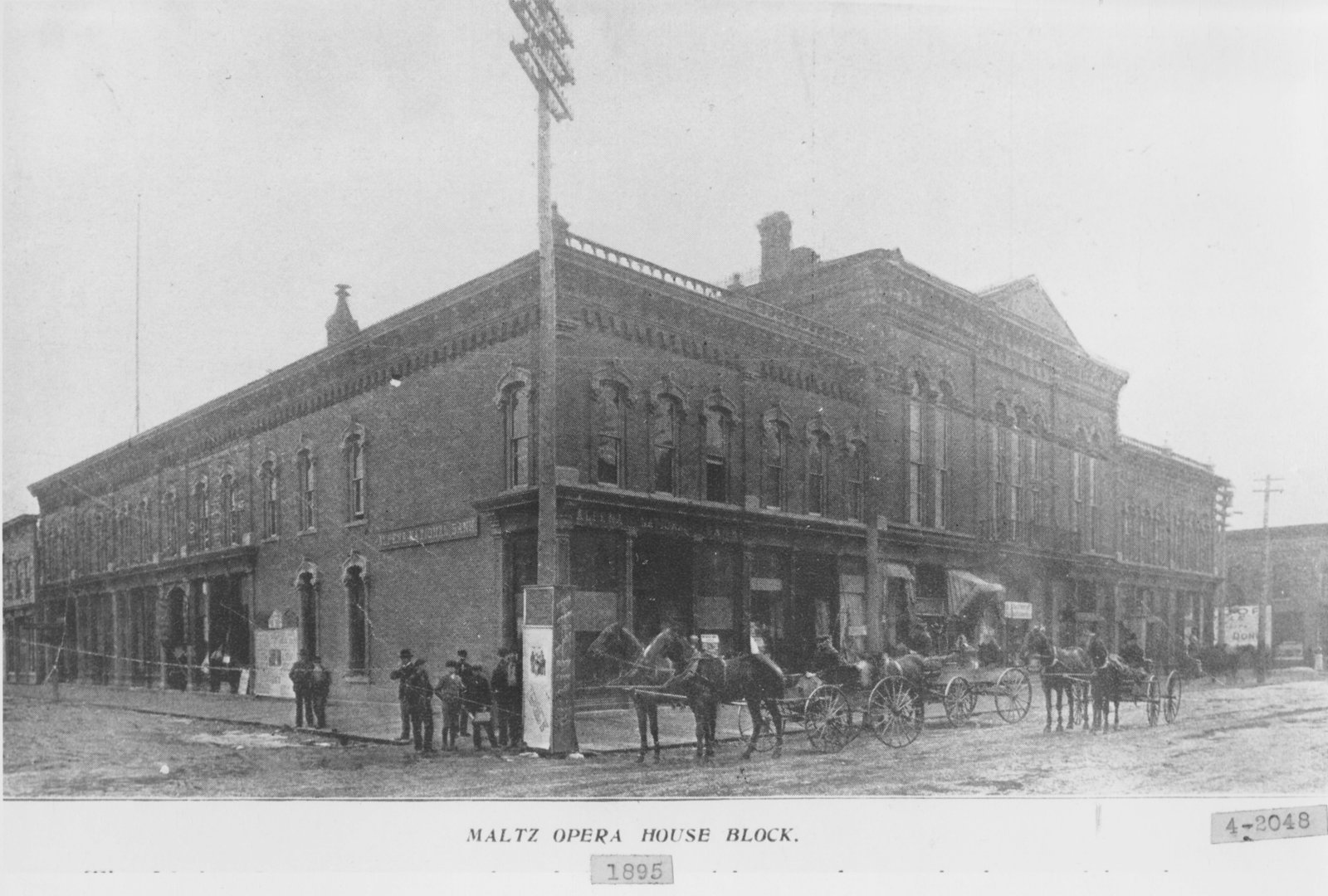
The Maltz Block, with the original Maltz Opera House

The rebuilt Maltz Theater opened in 1925. The theater was a more conventional design, with the auditorium on the first floor. The new Maltz focused on fireproofing, with a concrete and steel structure, and fireproof materials throughout the building.

W. S. Butterfield Theatres gained control of the theater in 1927, expanding the chain to 75 theaters in Michigan. In 1929, $30,000 (equivalent to $563,000 in 2025) of Movietone and Vitaphone equipment was installed. The first sound film, The Bellamy Trial, opened on April 21, 1929, with the day's showings selling over 4000 tickets.

On August 3, 1955, the Maltz reopened as the State Theater. The newly renovated State featured air conditioning and CinemaScope film technology. A new horizontal "State" marquee was also installed, replacing the vertical "Maltz" marquee. W. S. Butterfield Theatres gave no explanation for the name change.

The State Theater was formerly equipped with a pipe organ. The organ was removed from service with the advent of "talkies," and was sold to the Immanuel Lutheran Church in 1976.

W.S. Butterfield Theatres sold its theaters, including the State, to GKC Theatres in 1984.

== Multiplex era ==
The State Theater in 1988

GKC Theatres began converting the State into a multiplex in 1990, installing new walls inside the former single auditorium, and leaving much of the original plaster work and decor intact. The first phase of the renovations separated the balcony from the main floor in 1990, and the second phase in 1994 split the main floor into three.

Carmike Cinemas purchased the theater from GKC in 2005, as part of a larger transaction of 30 theaters. Under Carmike's operation, the theater was known as the Carmike State Cinemas.

Jeff and Tina Konczak, local property developers, intended to purchase the State in the early 2000s. Their discussions with Carmike Cinemas were progressing, but ended when AMC Theatres bought out Carmike in 2016.

== AMC ownership and restoration ==
AMC operated the State until 2020, when it and other AMC theaters closed due to the COVID-19 pandemic. The Konczak family bought the State and its sibling, the Royal Knight in 2021. The Royal Knight, located in a former JCPenney store, reopened in 2023 as the Sanctuary Cinema.

Demolition work on the interior of the State in early 2021 revealed the original interior of the Maltz Theater. The auditorium features the original plaster statues and murals, and the dressing rooms have signatures on the walls from performers in years past. The Konczak family restored the Maltz Opera House name and intends to reopen the Maltz as a live performance venue.

In 2022, the owners of the Maltz announced that they would pursue a National Register of Historic Places listing for the theater.
