= State Theatre (Ann Arbor, Michigan) =

Movie theater in Ann Arbor, Michigan

Coordinates: 42.2795°N 83.7405°W

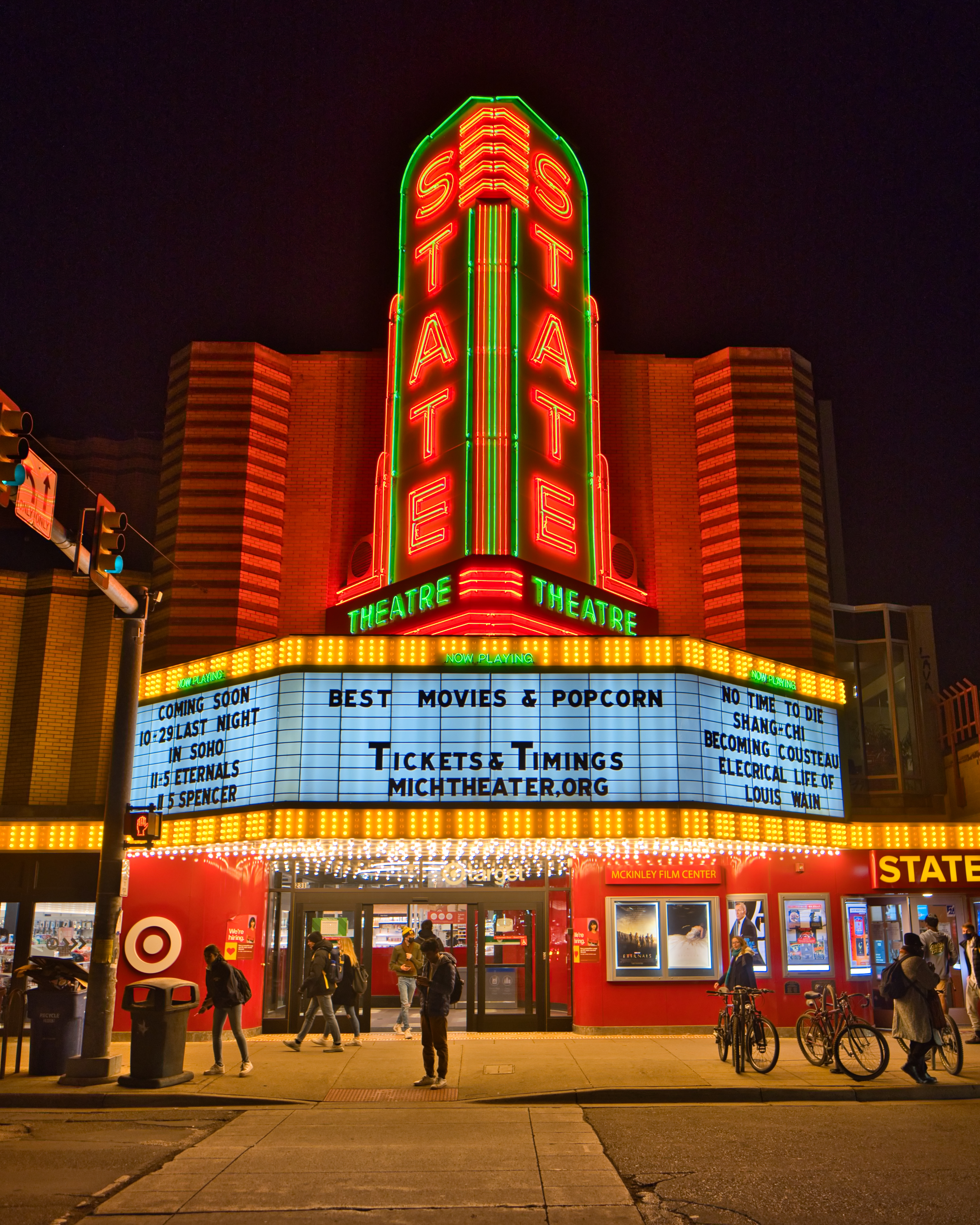
- The State Theatre's distinctive marquee
- Interactive map of State Theatre
- Location: 233 South State Street; Ann Arbor, Michigan, United States
- Owner: Marquee Arts (theaters); State Theater LLC (retail space)
- Operator: Marquee Arts

Construction
- Opened: March 18, 1942
- Renovated: 1979; 2017

Website
- marquee-arts.org

The State Theatre is a movie palace in Ann Arbor, Michigan, designed by C. Howard Crane in the Art Deco style.

The State was built by W. S. Butterfield Theatres, which also operated the nearby Michigan Theater. The non-profit Marquee Arts has operated the theater since 1999, complementing the Michigan's programming. The State's current 4 screens are located on the balcony of the former 1900-seat auditorium. A ground-floor retail space replaced the original auditorium's main floor in 1989, housing an Urban Outfitters store until 2020. The retail space now houses a small Target store.

The theater's central location and distinctive green, yellow and red marquee have made it an icon of Ann Arbor's downtown.

== History ==
=== Predecessors ===
W.S. Butterfield Theaters operated five theaters in Ann Arbor in 1940, including the Majestic Theater on Maynard Street, converted in 1907 from a roller rink. Butterfield planned to renovate the Majestic, but city officials denied permission for the work, prompting the construction of the State. The staff of the Majestic moved to the State, and Butterfield considered the State to be the Majestic's direct replacement.

After it ceased operations, the Majestic was condemned as unsafe. Butterfield's lease expired at the end of 1942, and the building was demolished in 1948.

=== Design and construction ===
In September 1940, Butterfield gave the first hints about building another theater in Ann Arbor when it evicted the tenants of its property at 221 South State Street. Weeks later, plans were revealed for the theater, designed in Art Deco style by Detroit-based movie palace architect C. Howard Crane.

The State was designed as a movie theater, with a small stage and no dressing rooms. The Butterfield circuit continued to use the nearby Michigan for live shows, with both theaters showing first-run movies.

The State opened to great fanfare on March 18, 1942, showing The Fleet's In. The Butterfield circuit assured customers that construction on the State had started before the United States entered World War II, and that no materials were taken from the war effort. The State was the first air-conditioned theater in Ann Arbor.

=== Modification ===
The first major modification to the State was the replacement of the original 18 by 16 feet (5.5 m × 4.9 m) screen with a 43 by 24 feet (13.1 m × 7.3 m) screen in November 1953.

The State was divided into a four-screen multiplex in 1979, with two auditoriums each on the balcony and the main floor. Manager Barry Miller cited economics and the need to book films for longer runs as reasons for the division.

=== Decline and retail conversion ===
W. S. Butterfield Theatres sold multiple theatres, including the State, to George Kerasotes in 1984. Kerasotes cut costs by eliminating discounts and replacing the unionized projectionists, members of IATSE, with untrained staff. The projectionists and their supporters in the community called for a boycott, and picketed the theater for months.

Kerasotes sold the State to Hogarth Management at a loss in 1989. Hogarth was owned by Tom Borders, founder of Borders, whose flagship store was located one block away from the State. Hogarth initially planned to convert the entire building to retail space, but their final plans only included the ground floor. These plans retained the two auditoriums on the former balcony, and the neon-lit marquee.

An Urban Outfitters store opened in the ground floor retail space in August 1989. Remnants of the original theater were visible in the store, including the structure of the balcony above the sales floor.

Aloha Entertainment, owned by the Spurlin family of Canton, Michigan, leased the space after years of vacancy, adding Hawaiian-themed decor. The theater reopened on November 13, 1992, showing second-run films at discount prices. A group of local investors bought the building in 1997, and Aloha's lease was terminated. The investor group hired the Michigan Theater Foundation to operate the State in 1999, reuniting the Michigan and State.

=== Restoration ===
In 2007, the Michigan Theater Foundation developed a contingency plan for taking control of the State. In 2013, the building's owners proposed to replace the upstairs theaters with apartments, and the Michigan Theater Foundation responded with an offer to buy the entire building. The Michigan Theater Foundation purchased the theaters, but not the retail space, in 2014.

A major renovation began in 2017, which restored the original Art Deco style. Tiles were custom-made, and the original carpet pattern was recreated from a sample preserved by a local historian. The 2017 renovation divided the space into four fully accessible theaters, featuring improved sight lines and contemporary projection and sound equipment.

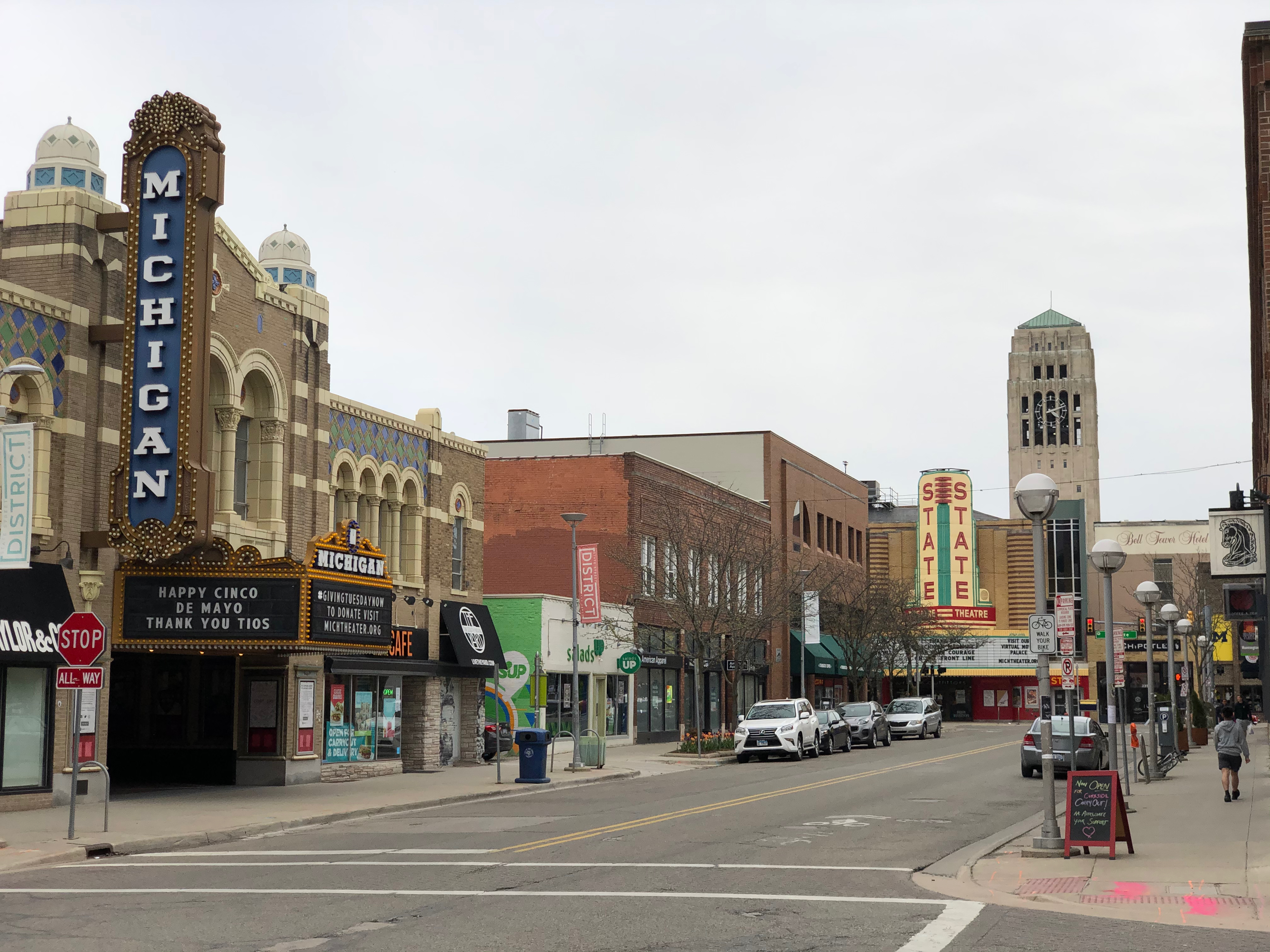
The State and Michigan Theater marquees in May 2020, advertising virtual showings in response to the COVID-19 pandemic

=== COVID-19 pandemic and recovery ===
The State Theatre was temporarily closed from March 2020 to February 2021 in response to the COVID-19 pandemic, with a brief reopening in October 2020. Programming continued while the building was closed, with the "Virtual Movie Palace" streaming movie series.

The Urban Outfitters store in the ground-level retail space moved to Briarwood Mall in November 2020.

A Target store opened in the ground-level space in 2021. The "small-format" store carries a limited selection of products, with an emphasis on groceries. The store is one of the smallest in the chain, at 12,000 square feet (1,100 m^{2}).

The Michigan Theater Foundation renamed itself to "Marquee Arts" in 2024.

== Programming ==
Marquee Arts operates the State Theatre, and the programming at the State is coordinated with the nearby Michigan. The State shows first run independent films and classics, with regular late night showings of cult favorites.
