= State Theatre (Traverse City, Michigan) =

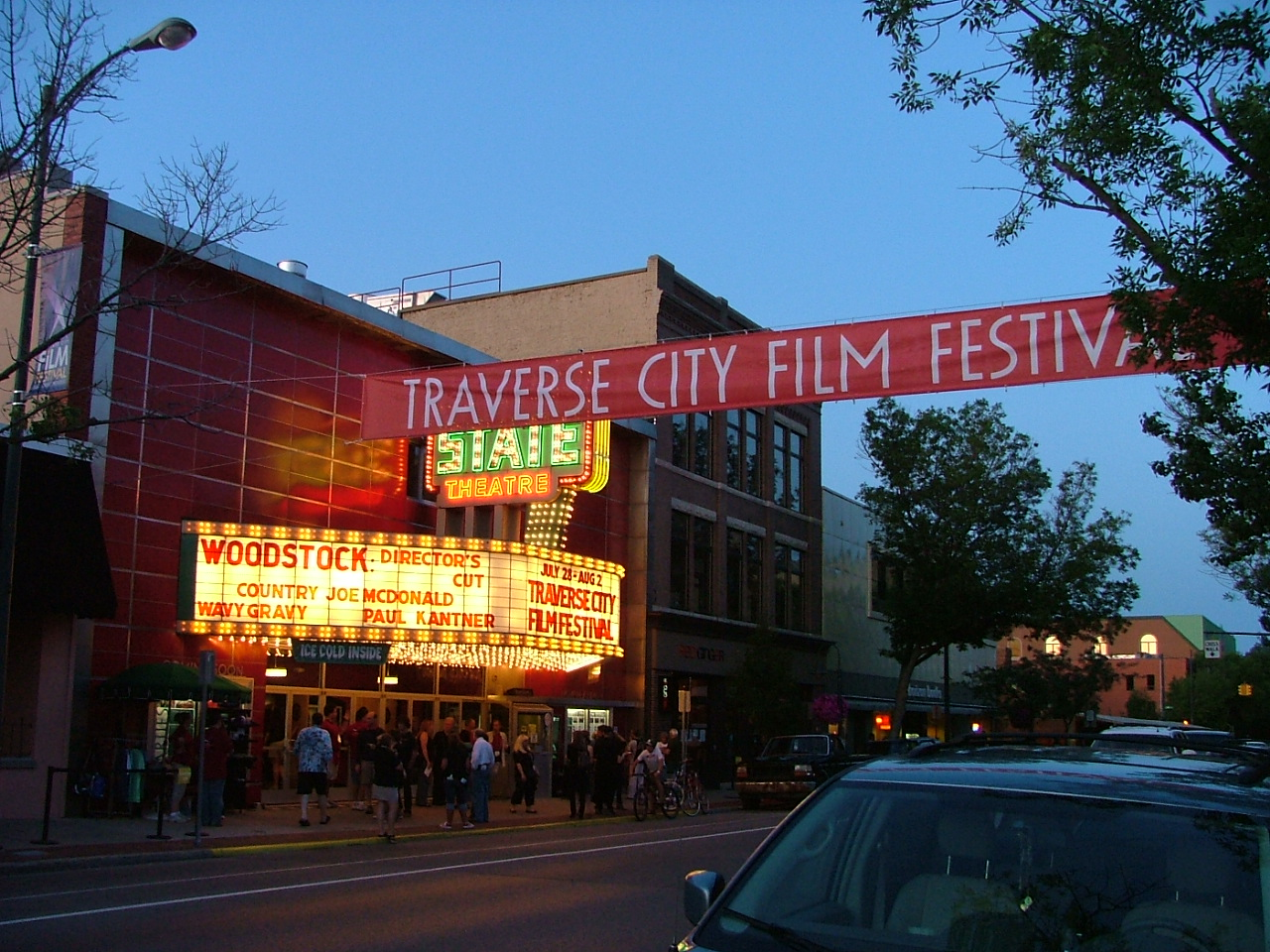
- The State in 2009, during the Traverse City Film Festival
- Interactive map of State Theatre
- Former names: Lyric Theatre (1916–1948)
- Address: 233 East Front Street; Traverse City, Michigan; United States
- Coordinates: 44°45′51.1″N 85°37′10.2″W

Construction
- Opened: July 4, 1916; 110 years ago
- Rebuilt: 1923; 1949

The State Theatre is a movie theater in Traverse City, Michigan. In its current iteration, it is operated by the Traverse City Film Festival, and presents a year-round schedule of film and live performances.

The State is the fourth theatre on its site on East Front Street. The first theatre on the block, Steinberg's Grand Opera House, opened in 1894. It closed in 1915, and was succeeded by the Lyric Theatre, which burned down in 1923. A new Lyric Theatre was built on the same site, and burned down 25 years later in 1948.

The present-day theatre, the State, opened in 1949 and operated as a first-run cinema until 1996. Multiple proposals to reuse the State failed, until it reopened in 2005 as the home of the Traverse City Film Festival. Major renovations were completed in 2007, turning the State into a contemporary atmospheric theatre.

== Predecessors ==
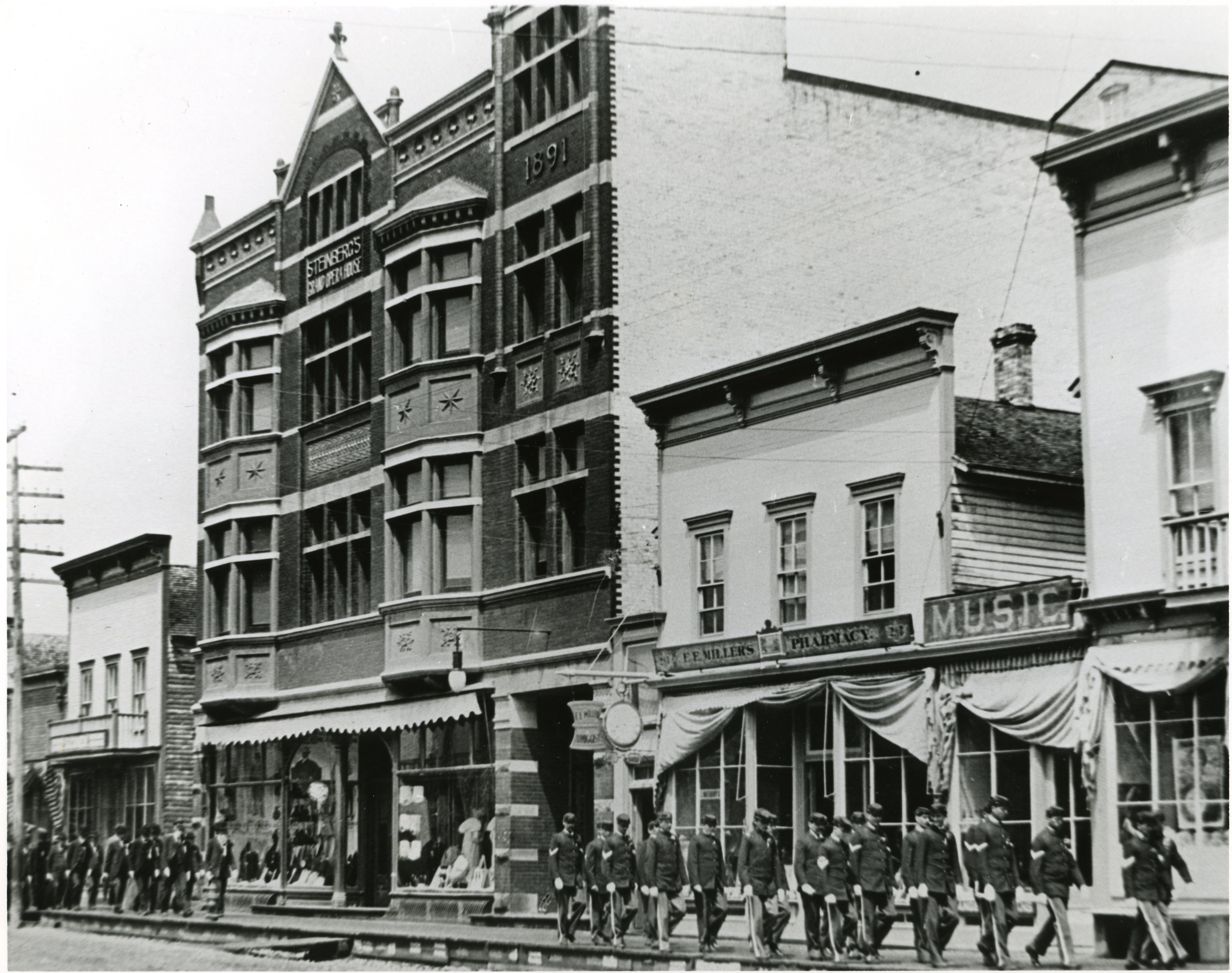
Steinberg's Grand Opera House, 1895

The predecessors of the State Theatre were built by Julius H. Steinberg, Traverse City's first Jewish resident. "Grandfather Julius" arrived in Traverse City in 1868 from Suwałki, Russian Poland, fleeing military conscription. Steinberg expanded his businesses from clothing to dry goods to live performance, and began construction on the State's predecessor, Steinberg's Grand Opera House, in 1891.

Construction of the opera house cost an estimated $60,000 (equivalent to $2,230,000 in 2025), and was financed partially by special sales of merchandise from Steinberg's retail business. The opera house opened in December 1894, with a production of Hamlet featuring Walker Whiteside. Steinberg's Grand Opera House had a seating capacity of 850, and featured a 32 by 45 feet (9.8 m × 13.7 m) stage. The opera house was located on the second floor of the Steinberg Block, which also contained Steinberg's other businesses and personal residence.

From its opening, Steinberg's Grand Opera House competed with the larger City Opera House, one block west. Through the early 20th century, Steinberg's presented live shows. Steinberg's showed movies for a brief period, but ceased in 1915, and Julius Steinberg proposed a new Lyric Theatre to replace the Opera House.

The first Lyric Theatre opened in 1916, purpose-built as a cinema. Steinberg sold the Lyric to the Fitzpatrick-McElroy circuit, and it stood until its destruction in a January 1923 fire, along with its entire block.

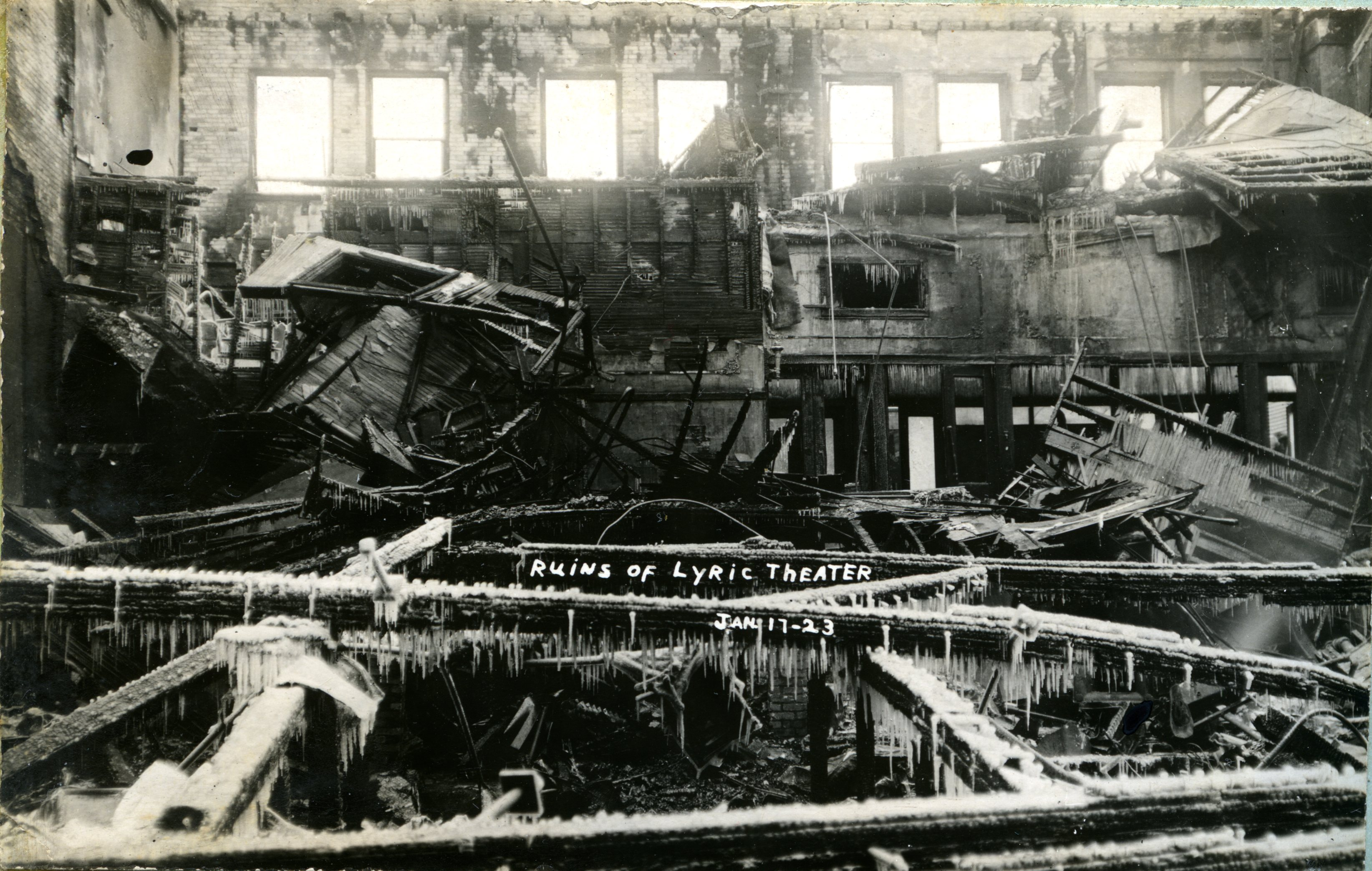
Ruins of the first Lyric Theatre, January 11, 1923

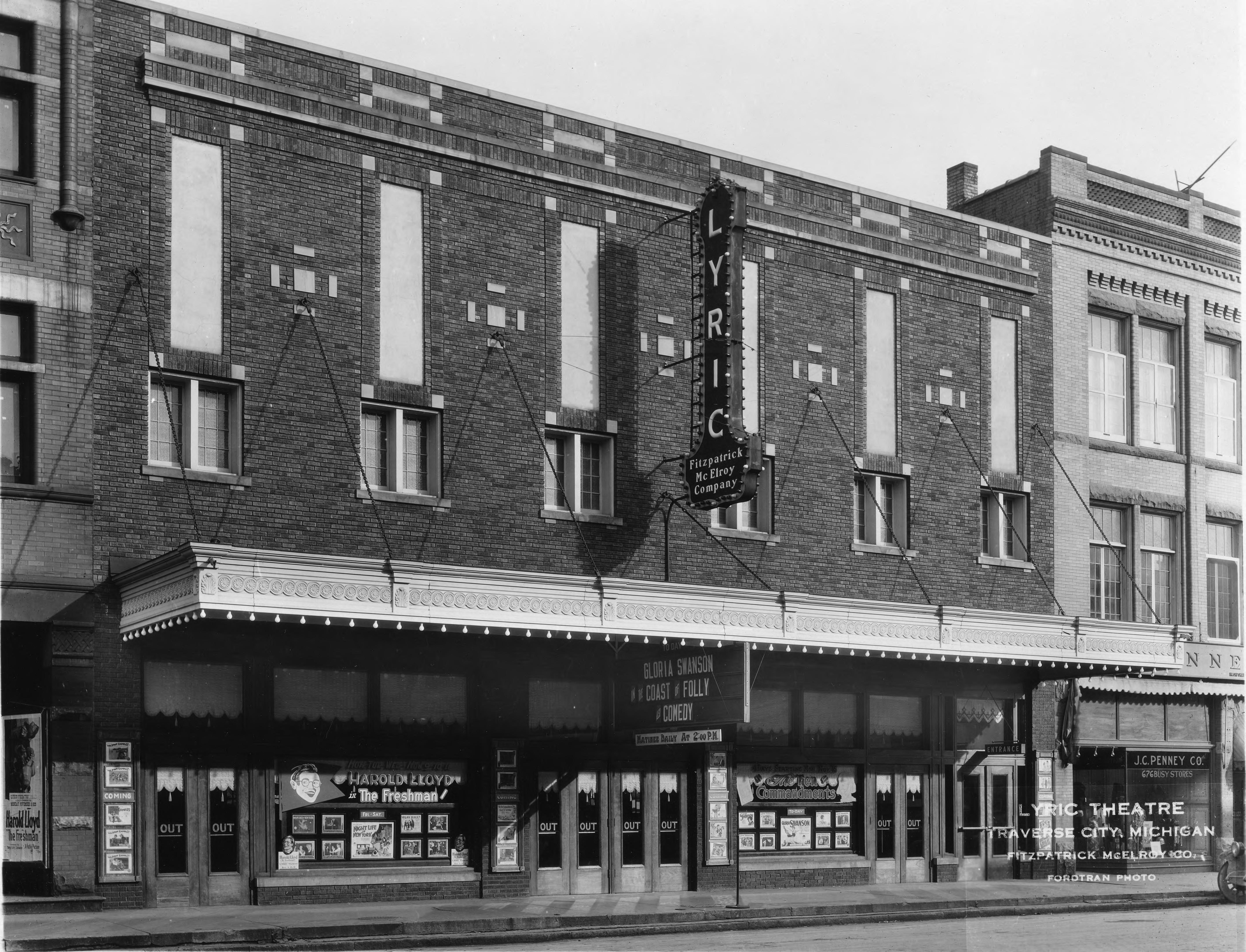
The second Lyric Theatre, ca. 1926

The Lyric was rebuilt by Fitzpatrick-McElroy, reopening in December 1923. The second Lyric Theatre was an entirely new 1250-seat house, featuring a 30 by 70 feet (9.1 m × 21.3 m) stage and an orchestra pit for 30 musicians. At its opening, the new Lyric was touted to be "as fireproof as any modern structure can be made."

W.S. Butterfield Theatres bought out the Fitzpatrick-McElroy circuit in September 1927, and took over operation of the Lyric. Butterfield operated the new Lyric until January 1948, when it again burned down.

== State Theatre era ==
W.S. Butterfield Theatres engaged the firm of C. Howard Crane to design the State Theatre on the site of the former Lyric Theatre. The State featured two large murals on the side walls of the auditorium, depicting futuristic visions of cherry ochards and pine trees. On opening day, June 30, 1949, Butterfield advertised that "every innovation in the motion picture theatre field which can add to the comfort and enjoyment of patrons has been included." The State originally featured 900 seats, including 50 on a small balcony.

The State operated as a single-screen cinema until 1978, when it was converted to two auditoriums. The conversion attracted the attention of the local Rotary Club, who performed an annual variety show at the State, but they were unable to make any changes to the plans. The "twinning" of the theatre was complete by Christmas 1978.

W.S. Butterfield Theatres was bought out by GKC Theatres in 1984, and GKC immediately caused controversy by dismissing the unionized projectionists. GKC closed the State in 1996, selling it to local philanthropist Barry Cole, who intended to present live performances in the space. Control of the State passed to the Interlochen Center for the Arts in 2003, but they too were unable to realize the vision of the State as a performing arts center.

The Traverse City Film Festival, led by founder Michael Moore, began using the State in 2005. Rotary Charities of Traverse City bought the theatre in 2006, and sold it to the film festival on favorable terms in 2007. The theatre was subject to deed restrictions, dating back to its 1996 sale by GKC, which forbade the showing of films at the theatre. This was bypassed by GKC's successor Carmike Cinemas, which reached an agreement with Moore and the Film Festival, permitting the showing of limited-distribution films.

The Film Festival refurbished the theatre significantly. One significant addition to the State is a new ceiling, using fiber optics to depict twinkling stars, in a contemporary interpretation of the atmospheric theatre. The atmospheric ceiling was designed by Jerry Dobek, professor of astronomy at Northwestern Michigan College, and accurately depicts the view from Traverse City on a clear night in August.

== Programming ==
The State Theatre offers a variety of weekly programming, from $1 kids matinees on Saturdays and Wednesday Community Night Screenings to TCFF Tuesdays, with First Runs showing Friday through Sunday. The State also has an entire week of free screenings each year to coincide with the spring break of Traverse City Area Public Schools.
