= Michigan Theatre (Jackson, Michigan) =

- U.S. National Register of Historic Places
- Michigan State Historic Site
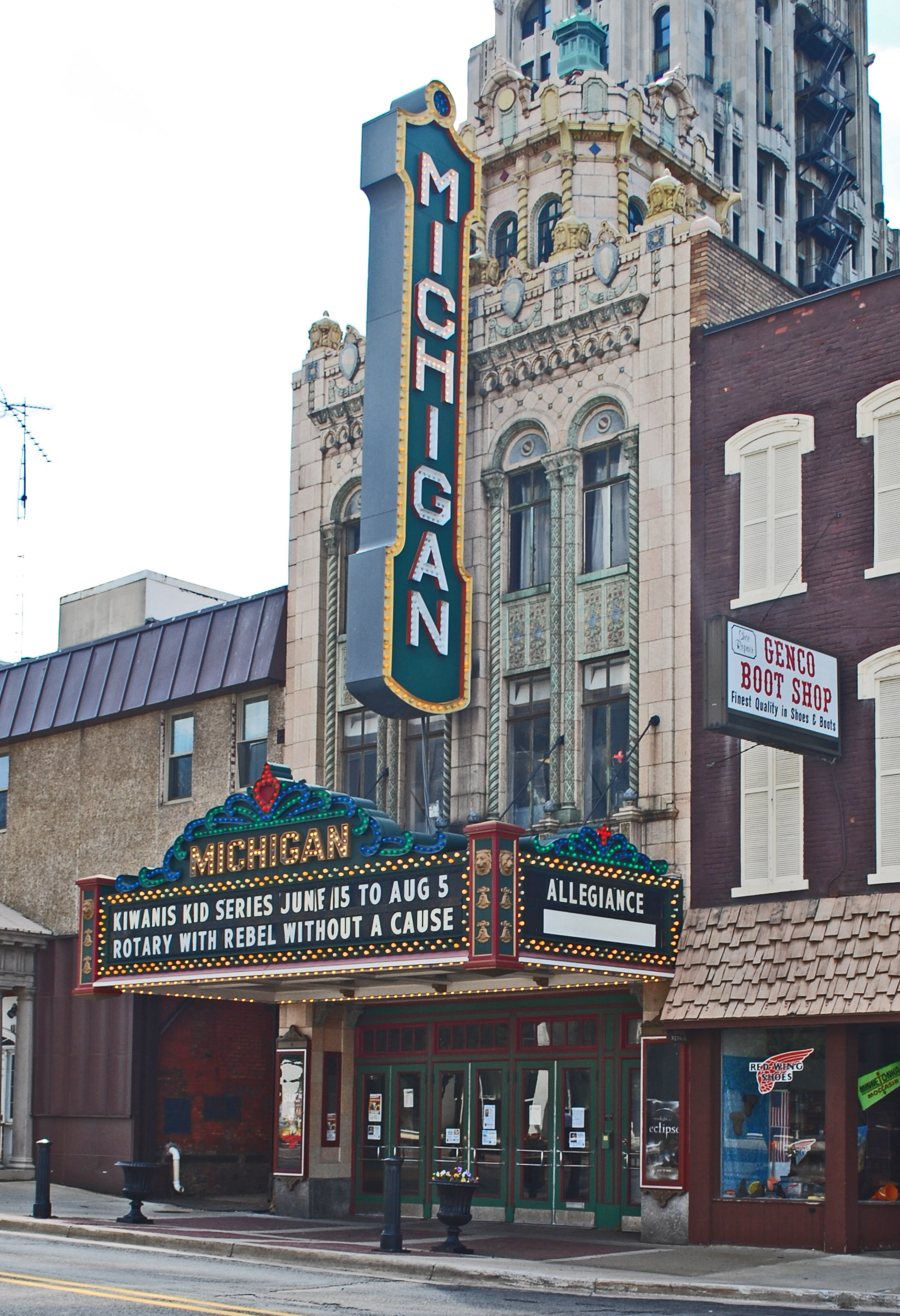
- Exterior of the Michigan Theatre from Mechanic Street

- Location within Michigan Location within the United States
- Interactive map
- Location: 124 N Mechanic St, Jackson, Michigan
- Coordinates: 42°14′49″N 84°24′20″W
- Area: 1 acre (0.40 ha)
- Built: 1928
- Architect: Maurice Finkel
- Architectural style: Late 19th and 20th Century Revivals
- NRHP reference No.: 80001874
- Added to NRHP: May 8, 1980

The Michigan Theatre is a historic movie palace in downtown Jackson, Michigan. The theater was built for W. S. Butterfield Theatres, and opened in 1930 as the first air-conditioned building in downtown Jackson. It was designed by Detroit architect Maurice Herman Finkel, who also designed the contemporaneous Michigan Theater in Ann Arbor.

W. S. Butterfield Theatres operated the Michigan until 1978, and the theater was listed on the National Register of Historic Places in 1980. The city of Jackson took ownership of the theater in 1993, and sold it to a nonprofit group that year. Major renovations occurred in 2005 and 2024, retaining the original architectural style.

== History ==
The Michigan Theatre was built for W. S. Butterfield Theatres, a cinema chain founded by "Colonel" Walter Scott Butterfield that operated across Michigan in the 20th century. Construction on the Michigan Theatre began in 1928. The theater was designed by Detroit architect Maurice Herman Finkel. It is reported that the design incorporated a narrow commercial block already extant on Mechanic Street to house the entry.

The Michigan Theatre opened to the public April 30, 1930. It was built for the mainstream popular entertainment of the day, vaudeville and movies. For just a few pennies, the public of the 1930s entered the building and were treated as royalty. As guests entered the exotic Spanish-styled building, they found lavish interior plasterwork of the 1930s, polychrome terra cotta facade, walnut furniture, wool carpets, oil paintings, heavy demask draperies, and exotic stained glass light fixtures.

The original owner of the theater, Butterfield Theatres, maintained the theater until business ceased in May 1978. The nonprofit Michigan Theatre Preservation Association leased the building from Butterfield later that year and operated it until 1982, when it disbanded due to a lack of funding. The original marquee was declared unsafe in 1987, and was replaced in 1989.

The city of Jackson took ownership of the building in 1993 due to unpaid property taxes, and The Michigan Theatre of Jackson, Incorporated acquired the theater from the city of Jackson that August. The non-profit corporation continues to restore the building, receiving a Michigan Historic Preservation Award in 2012 for its restoration efforts.

Today the theater brings in classic films, art films, live theater productions, concerts, meetings, and other community events. When the restoration is finished, the theater will attract tourists to downtown Jackson and help the local economy. In 2012, the Michigan Theatre hosted over 300 events and continues to thrive via generous donations from many and excellence in programming.

The theatre completed a major renovation program in 2024, which began in 2022 after being interrupted by the COVID-19 pandemic. The renovations included the installation of new ventilation systems, a new digital marquee sign sponsored by a local credit union, and a new projector for films.

== Description ==
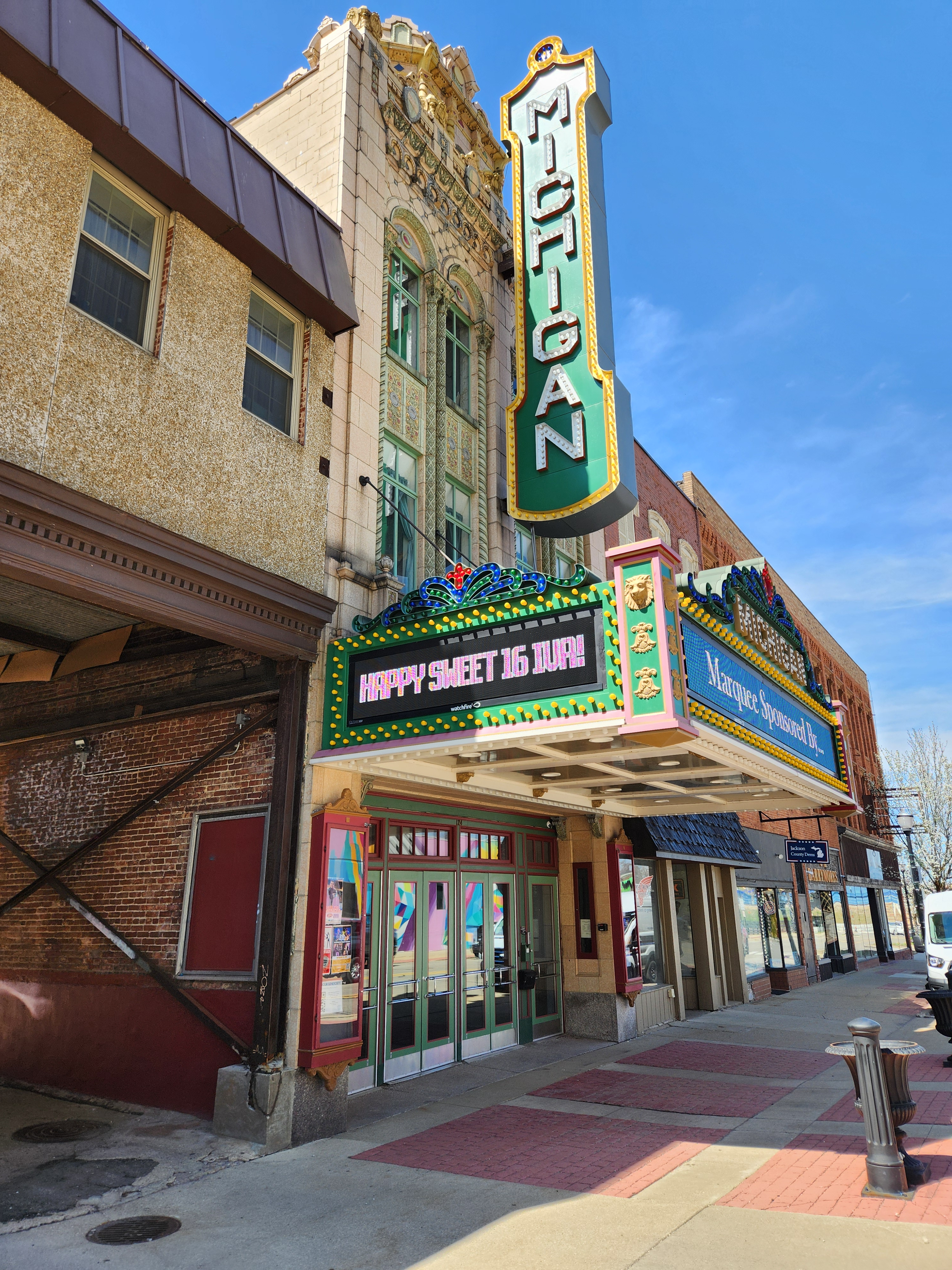
Detail of the digital marquee sign

The Michigan Theatre consists of an auditorium building, located sixty feet from Mechanic Street, and a narrow entrance block that connects to the street. The entrance block is a three-story structure, sixty feet deep and about twenty-five feet wide, faced with yellow terra cotta tiles. The facade has two paired Italian Romanesque-inspired windows and a Spanish Baroque tower with a red tile roof. The block contains outer and inner lobbies, and a concession counter, on the first floor. There is office space on the second floor and a third-floor apartment, originally for the theater manager. The auditorium building is red brick, containing the auditorium measuring approximately 100 feet by 65 feet. It seats approximately 1600 people on the main floor and a deep balcony above.
