= W. S. Butterfield Theatres =

Vaudeville and cinema chain in Michigan, United States

- Industry: Entertainment
- Founder: Walter Scott Butterfield
- Headquarters: Detroit
- Number of locations: 114 (1942)
- Area served: Michigan

W. S. Butterfield Theatres, Inc. was an American operator of vaudeville theaters and later movie theaters in the Lower Peninsula of Michigan. Beginning in the early 1900s, "Colonel" Walter Scott Butterfield expanded his business from one vaudeville house in Battle Creek in 1906 to 114 cinemas across Michigan in 1942. The Butterfield circuit was reduced to 21 theaters by 1984, when it was sold to George Kerasotes.

Butterfield theaters were located in small towns in Lower Michigan, as far north as Traverse City and Alpena. Theaters built for or operated by Butterfield are the subject of multiple historic preservation efforts, and many still operate as cinemas or performance venues. Theaters built for Butterfield were constructed in various contemporary styles, including Art Deco, Streamline Moderne, Mayan Revival, and Spanish Colonial Revival.

== Vaudeville origins ==
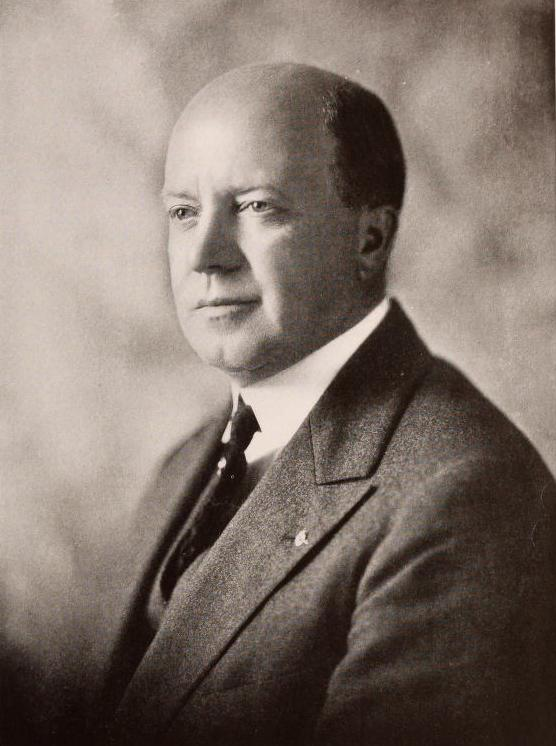
W. S. Butterfield, founder, ca. 1925

Walter Scott Butterfield moved to Battle Creek in the early 20th century, having established himself in the theater business first in Columbus, Ohio, and then in Chicago, managing touring vaudeville shows. Butterfield promoted the construction of the Henry Boyle Theater in Fond du Lac, Wisconsin, and from there was advised to move to West Michigan by a Pantages circuit executive.

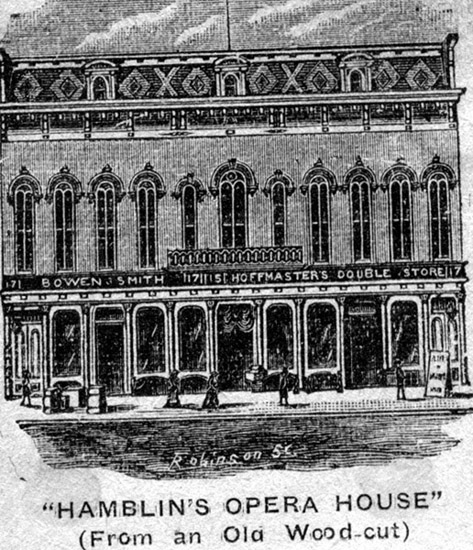
The Hamblin Opera House in 1877, later the Bijou Theatre

Butterfield's first theater was the Hamblin Opera House, located at 17 West Michigan Avenue in Battle Creek. The Hamblin was built for A.C. Hamblin, noted Battle Creek banker, in 1869. The construction of the nearby Post Theater in 1902 hurt business at the Hamblin Opera House, and Butterfield arranged to lease it in 1905. Butterfield refurbished the Hamblin at a cost of $1000 (equivalent to $35,000 in 2024), renamed it the Bijou Theatre, and booked vaudeville acts. "Bijou" is French for "jewel" or "little gem," and was a common name for theaters nationwide during the vaudeville era.

The Bijou expanded into a circuit, the Bijou Theatrical Enterprise. Butterfield arranged to affiliate his theaters with the Keith-Proctor vaudeville circuit, and expanded rapidly in the 1910s. Butterfield moved his operations in Battle Creek to a larger theatre in 1909, and the former Hamblin Opera House became a department store three years later.

== Expansion into film ==
The Butterfield circuit expanded quickly at the advent of sound films. In the 1920s, Butterfield bought out individual theatres and whole circuits throughout Michigan, and embarked on major construction projects of its own. The circuit hired reputable architects for its construction and renovation projects, including John Eberson and C. Howard Crane. A major acquisition was the Fitzpatrick-McElroy circuit in 1927, which added 16 theaters for a total of 75.

Colonel Butterfield died in Boston in 1936. He was succeeded as president of the company by Edward C. Beatty, who began as the manager of the Bay City Bijou in the early days of the company. The Butterfield circuit controlled 114 houses by 1942, and eventually peaked at 122.

The company attempted to expand into the TV business in the early 1950s, and applied for a license for Channel 12 in the Flint area. Butterfield lost the competition for the license to the owners of WJR in a three-way contest, and appealed the decision in lawsuits against WJR and the Federal Communications Commission. Butterfield's lawsuits were unsuccessful, and WJRT signed on in 1958 as a sister station of WJR.

== Estate control ==
Colonel Butterfield died in 1936. In his will, he stipulated that his estate and its four trustees would retain control of the company after his death. Minority stakes were sold to two film studios, RKO and Paramount. The Paramount decree of 1948 forced the film studios to divest their shares of theater operators, and Butterfield was again independent by 1950. The University of Michigan bought out Paramount's stake, to be paid from dividends, and by 1965 the university owned approximately one third of the company. RKO's stake reverted to the Butterfield estate.

The Butterfield circuit held monopolies on theatres in some Michigan towns, which in some cases caused controversy. In the 1930s, Butterfield leased and intentionally closed Manistee's Ramsdell Theatre to retain its monopoly, to the dissatisfaction of the local press. In the 1960s, Butterfield's monopoly on Ann Arbor cinemas caused contention with students at the University of Michigan, who criticized the company and the university for a 25% price increase. U-M students responded by increasing the pace of student-operated film screenings in university buildings.

Mary Alice Butterfield Nichols, Colonel Butterfield's niece, left the business in 1954. Her departure ended family management of the company, leaving the management of the business exclusively to the trustees of Col. Butterfield's estate.

== Decline and sale ==
The circuit operated 63 theatres in 1963, split among seven corporate entities.

In the late 1970s, a legal dispute arose between Butterfield's great-grandchildren and the trustees of the estate. The case, In re Butterfield Estate (Gowthorpe v. Page), was decided by the Michigan Supreme Court in 1983.

Butterfield Theatres agreed to sell 21 of its theaters to George Kerasotes in late 1984. The sale was prompted by the heirs of the estate, who were reported to "‘want out’ completely." George Kerasotes planned to merge the Butterfield theaters with Kerasotes Theatres, the family business, but other members of the family objected. Kerasotes Theatres split in two in 1985, and George Kerasotes formed GKC Theatres to absorb the former Butterfield theaters. Many GKC theaters were sold to Carmike Cinemas, which was subsequently acquired by AMC Theatres.

== Legacy ==
W. S. Butterfield Theatres Inc. continued in operation after selling its theater business. As of 2019, the surviving company is engaged in non-residential property management.

== Gallery ==
Selected former Butterfield theatres

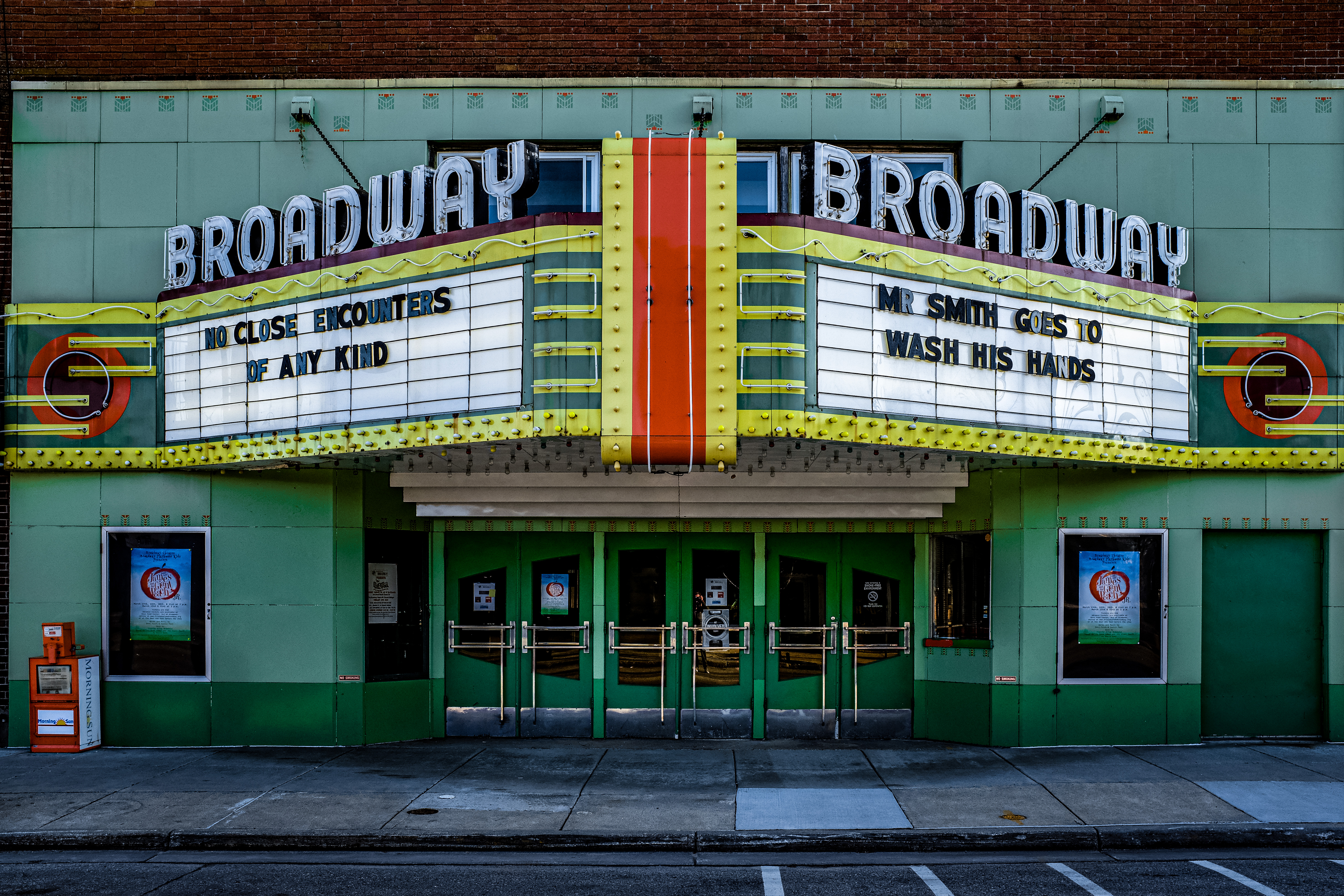
Broadway Theatre, Mount Pleasant

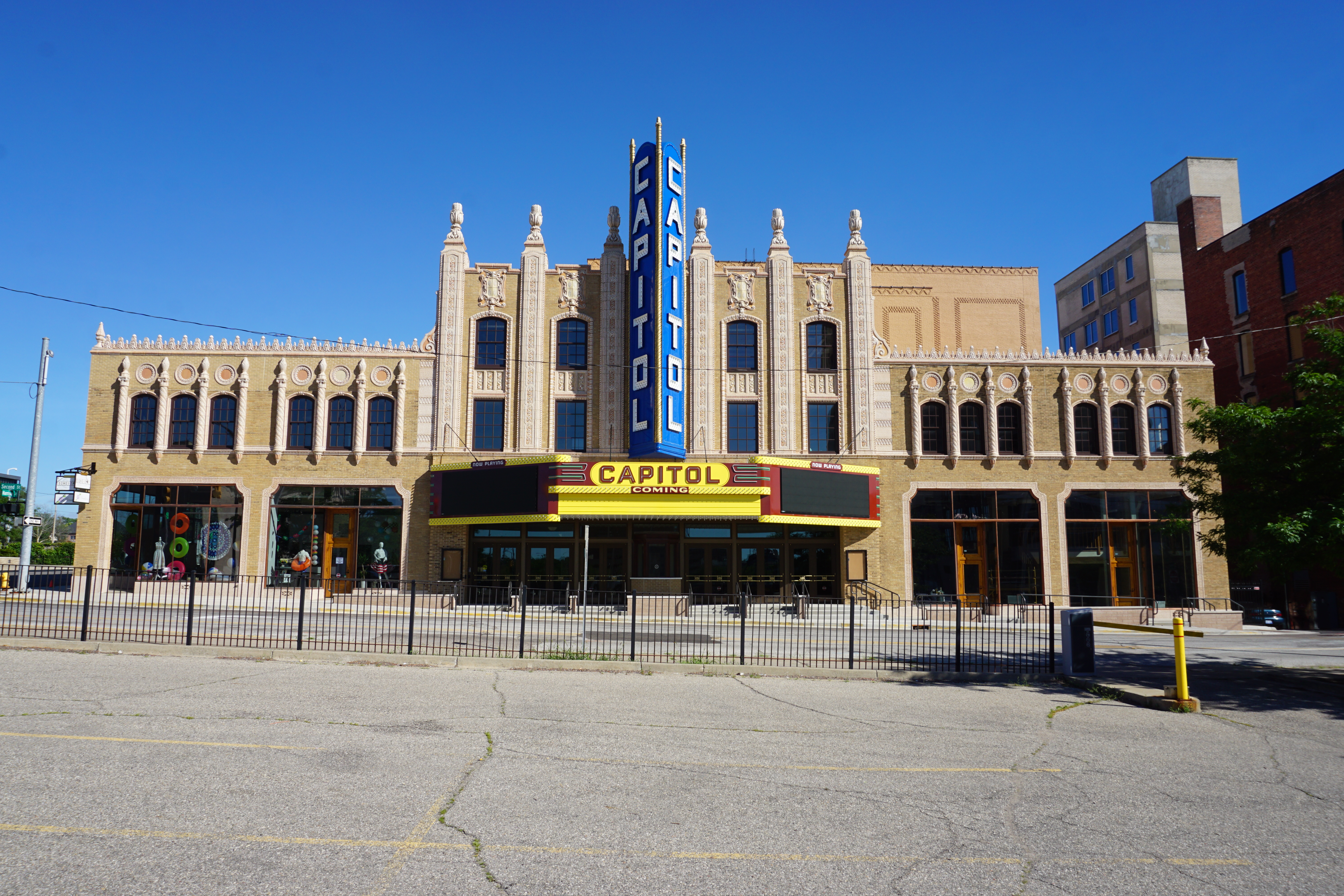
Capitol Theatre, Flint

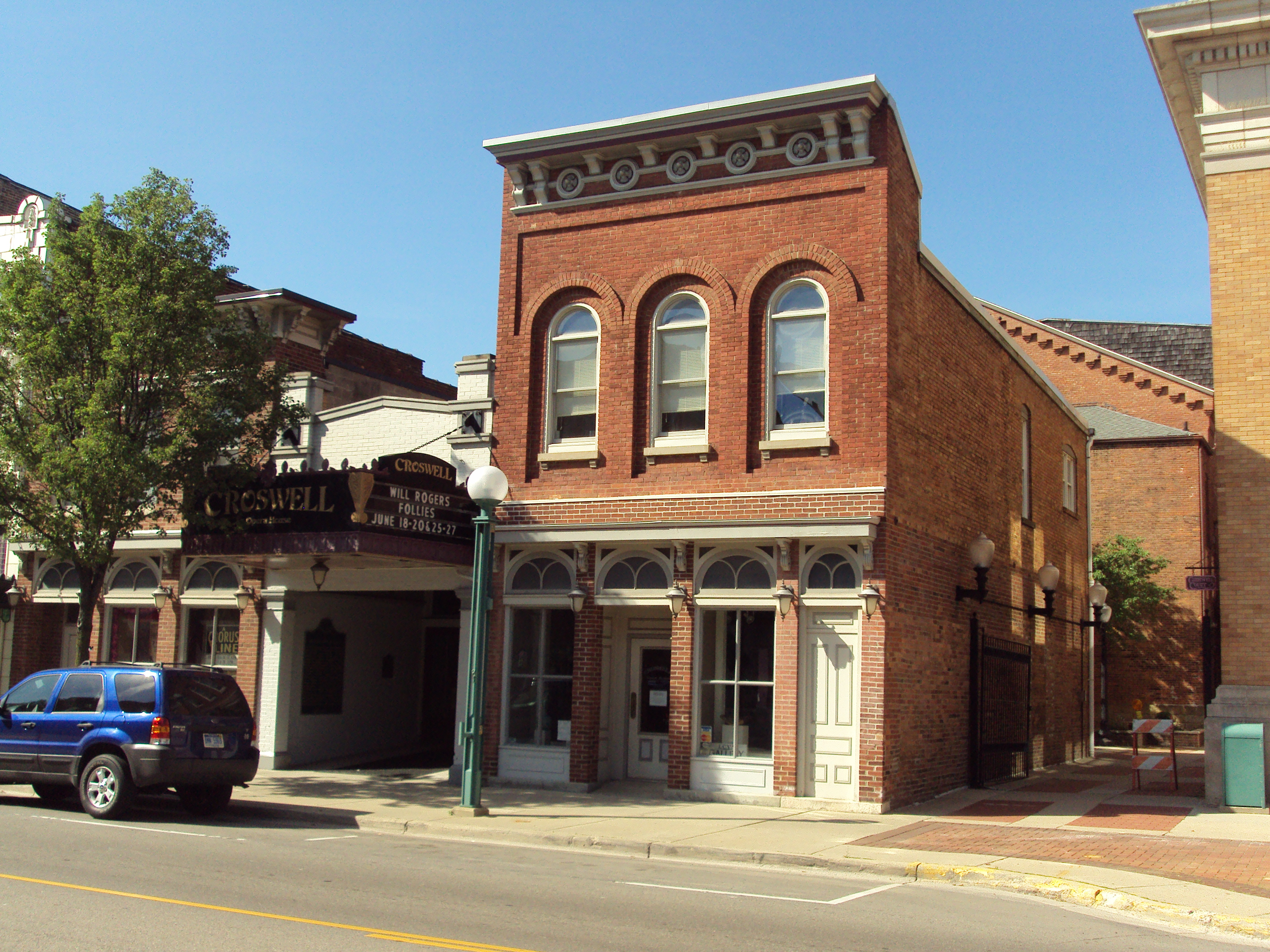
Croswell Opera House, Adrian

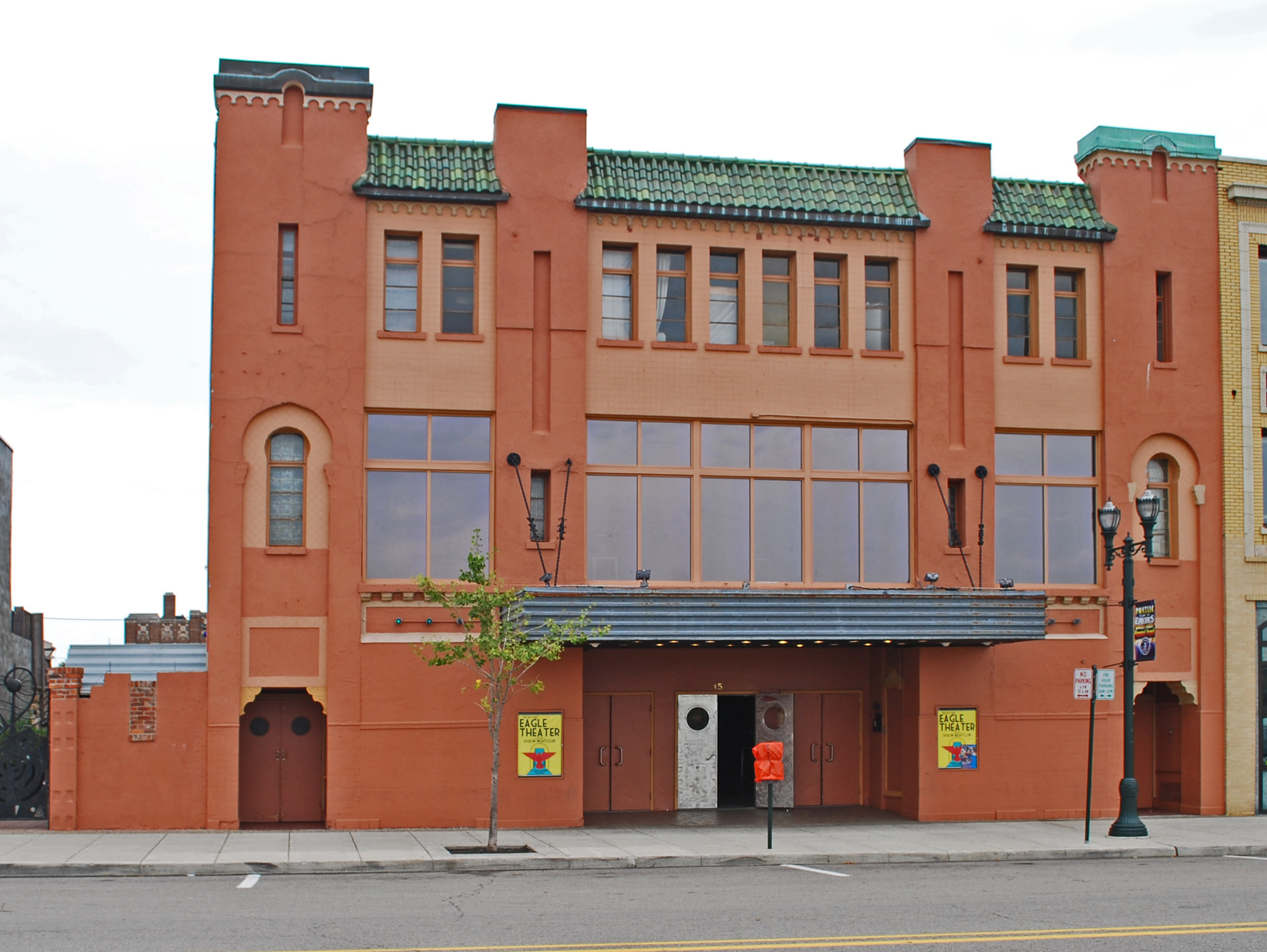
Elektricity Nightclub, Pontiac, formerly the Eagle Theater

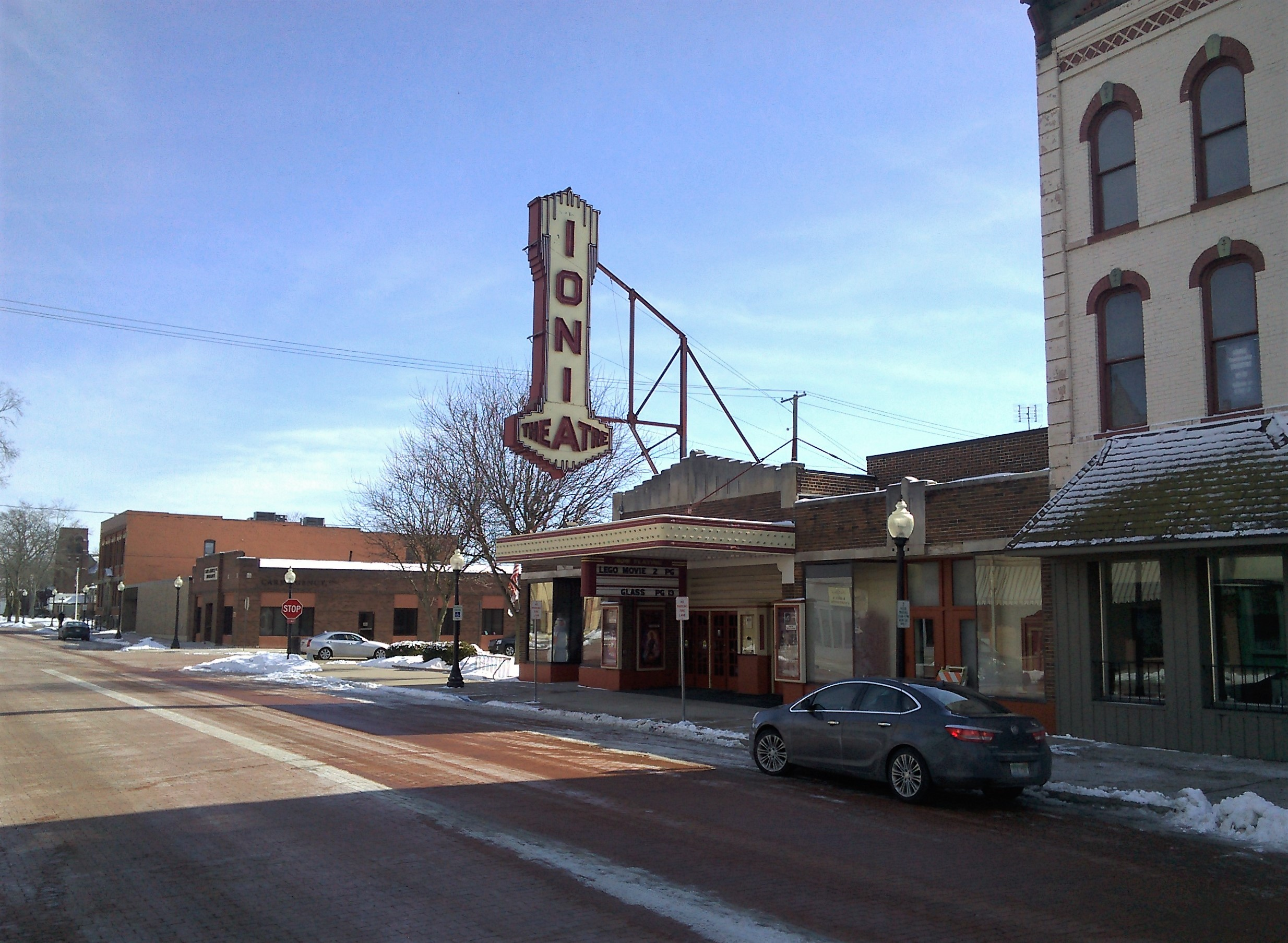
Ionia Theatre, Ionia

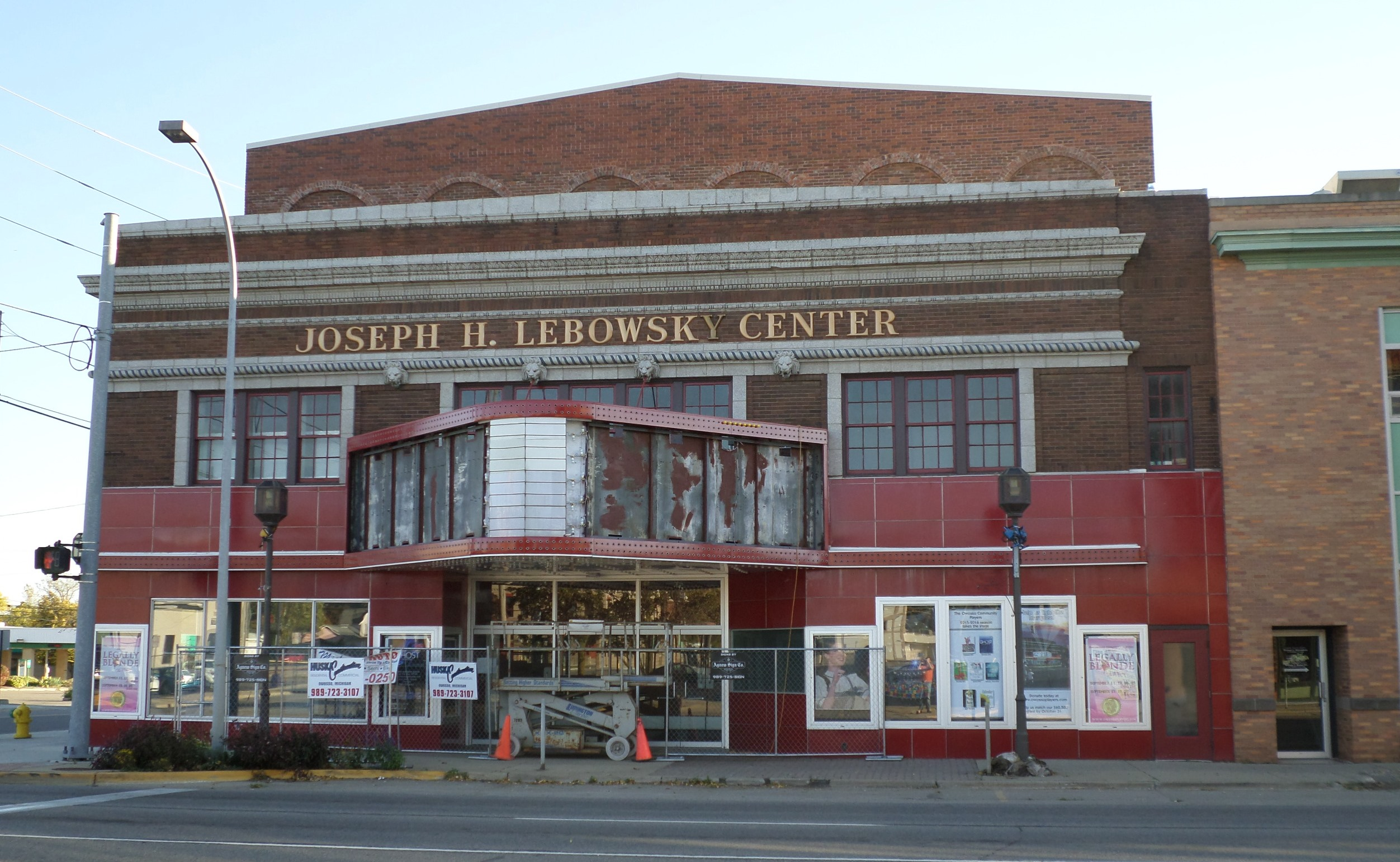
Joseph Lebowsky Center, Owosso, formerly the Capitol Theatre

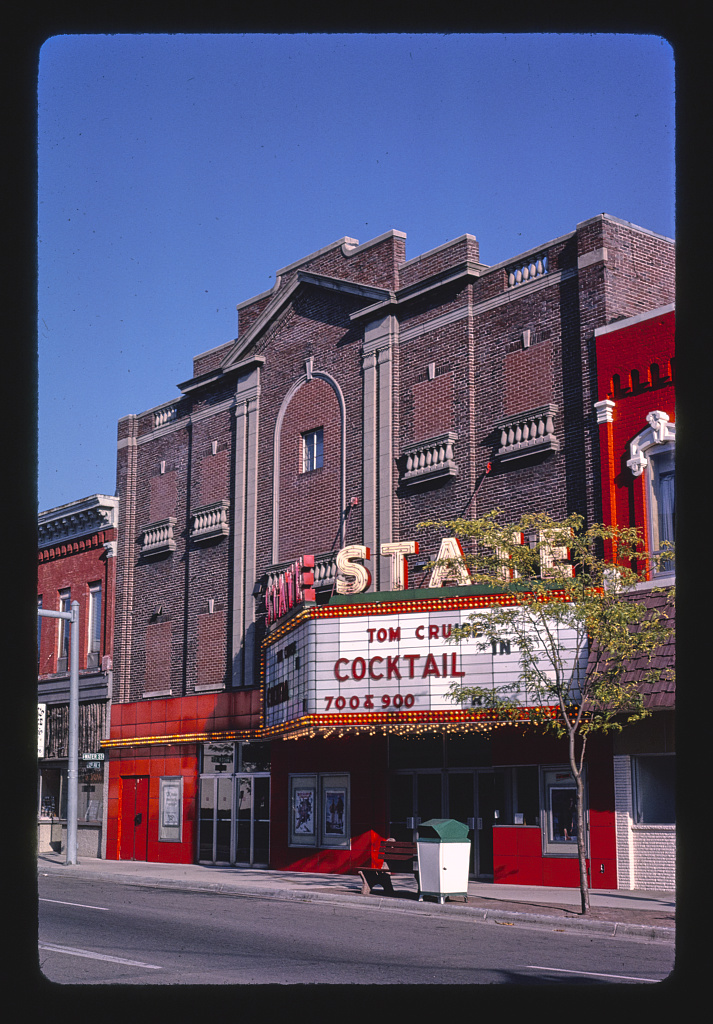
Maltz Opera House, Alpena

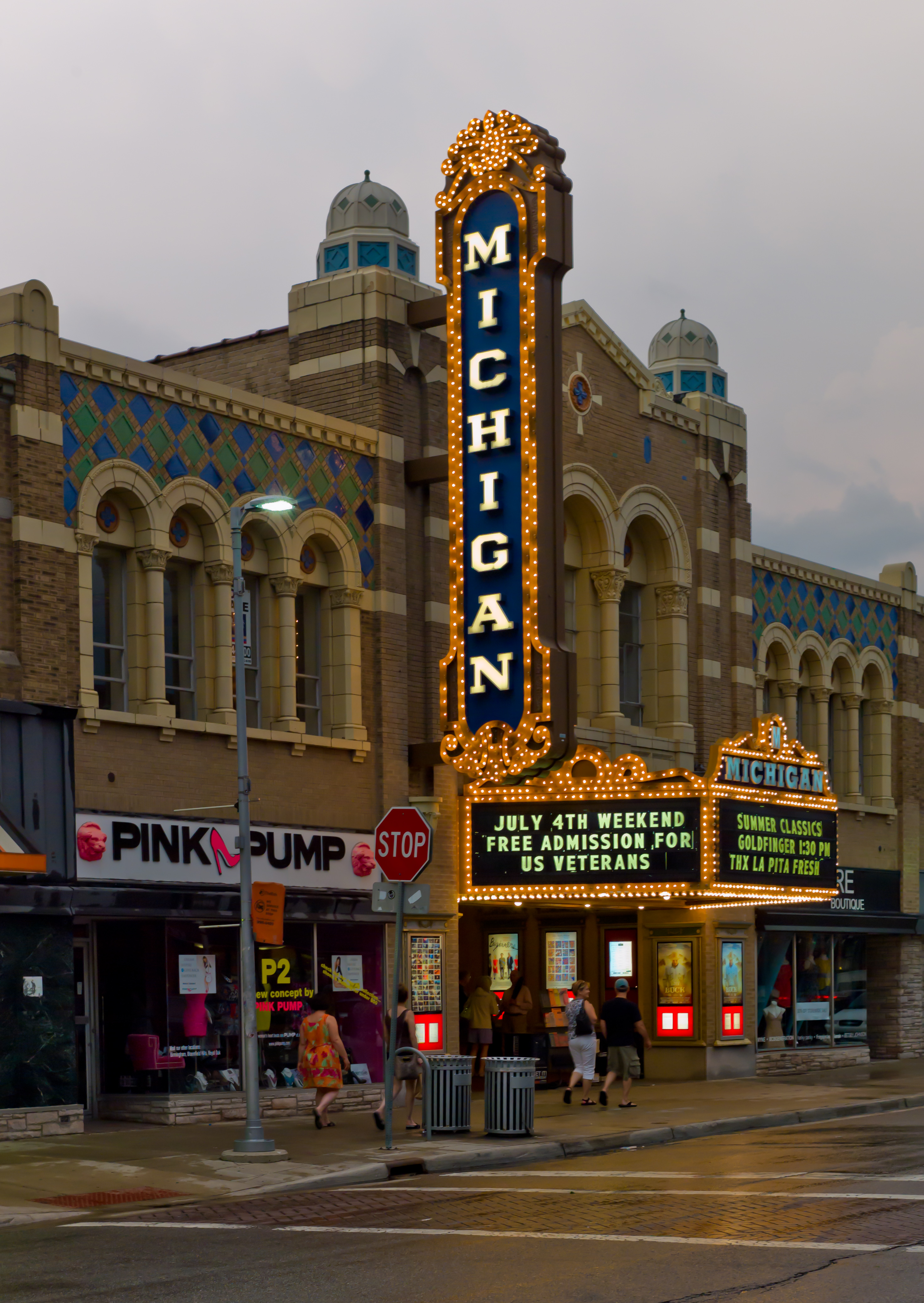
Michigan Theater, Ann Arbor

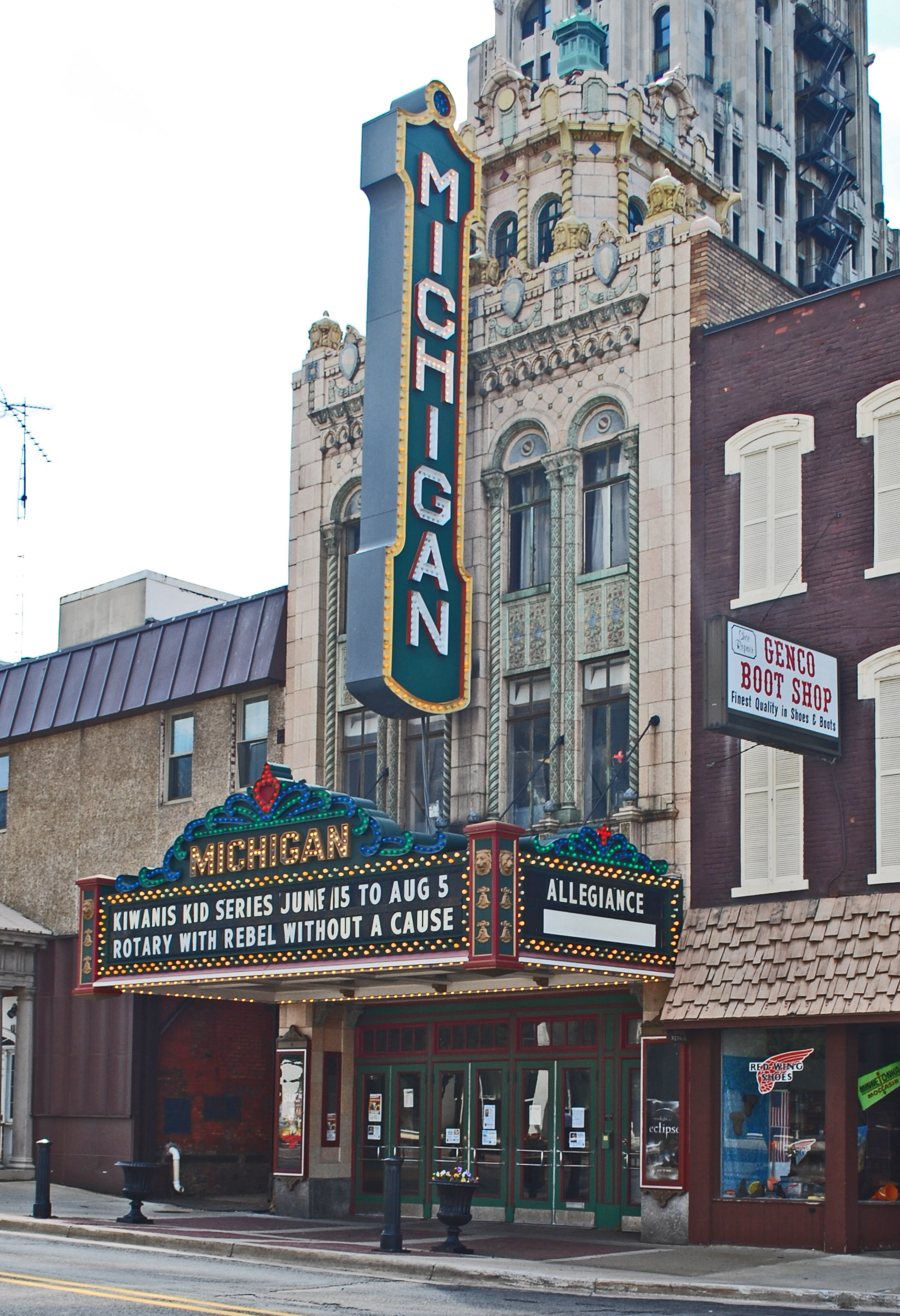
Michigan Theatre, Jackson

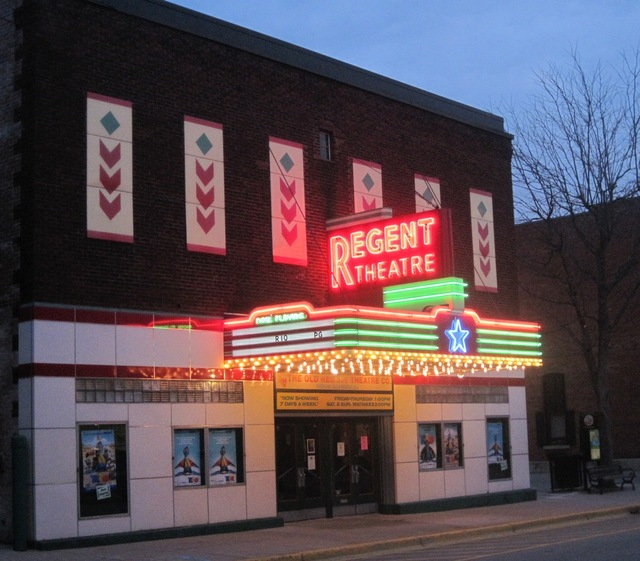
Regent Theatre, Allegan

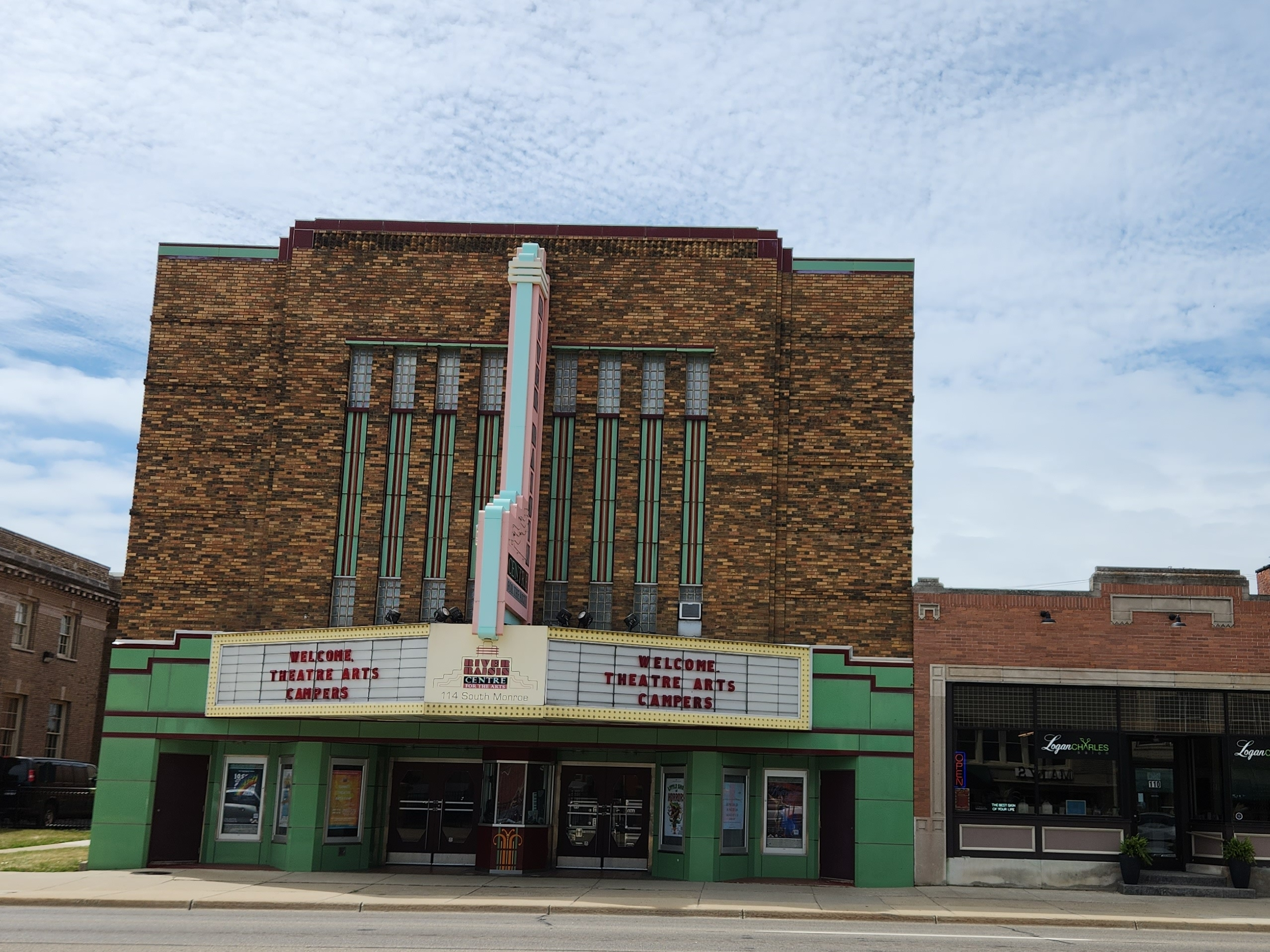
River Raisin Centre for the Arts, Monroe, formerly the Monroe Theatre

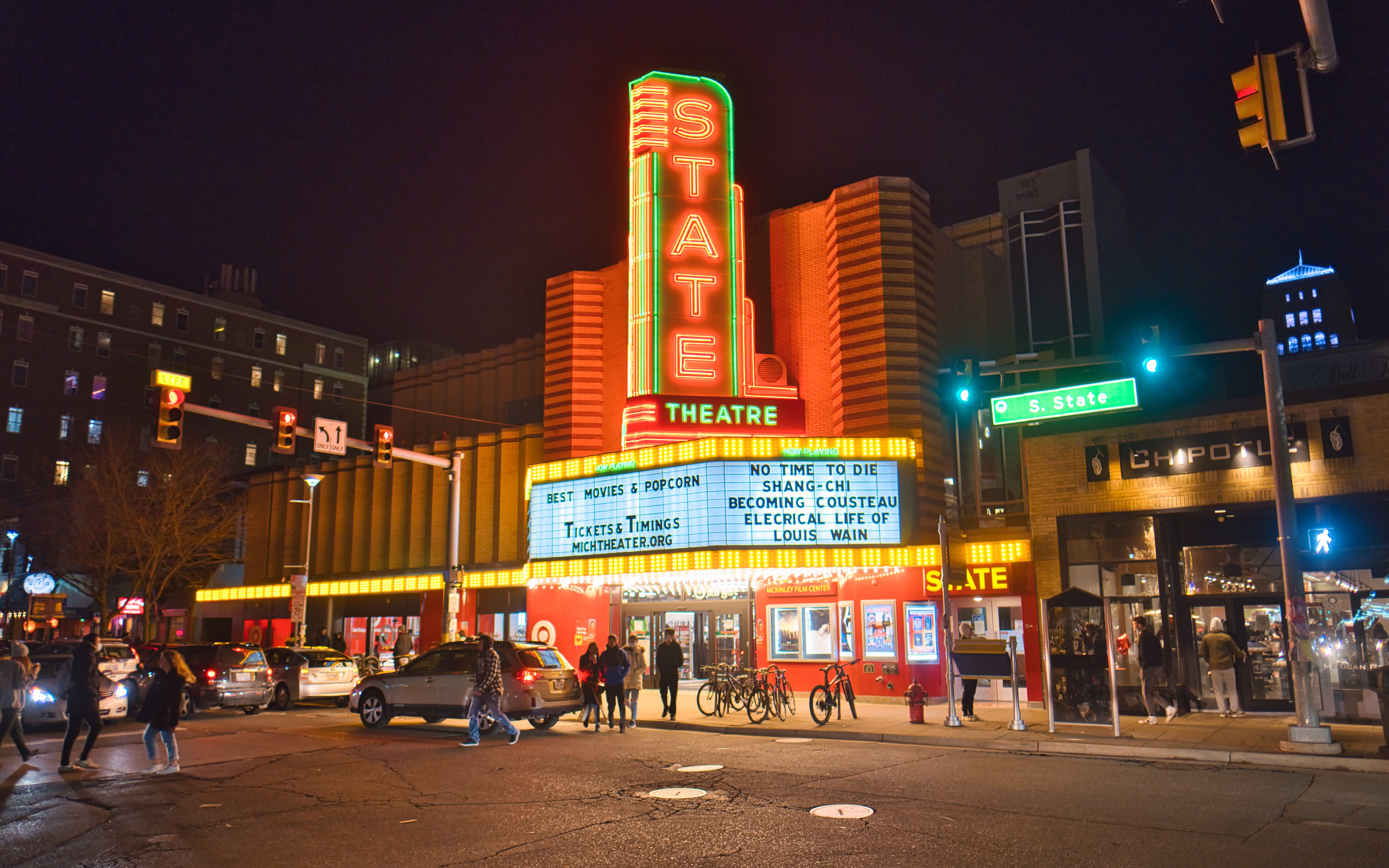
State Theatre, Ann Arbor

State Theatre, Bay City

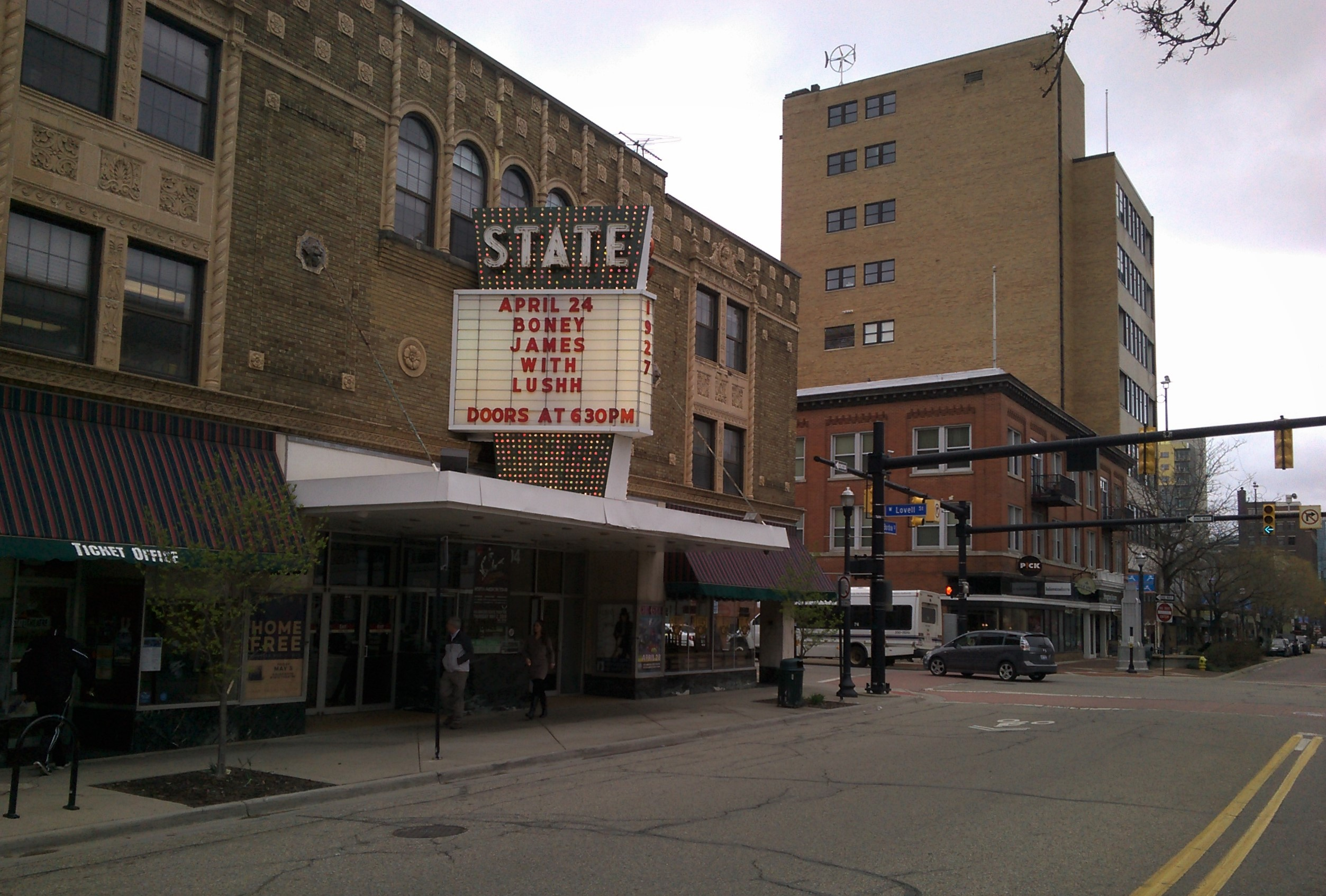
State Theatre, Kalamazoo

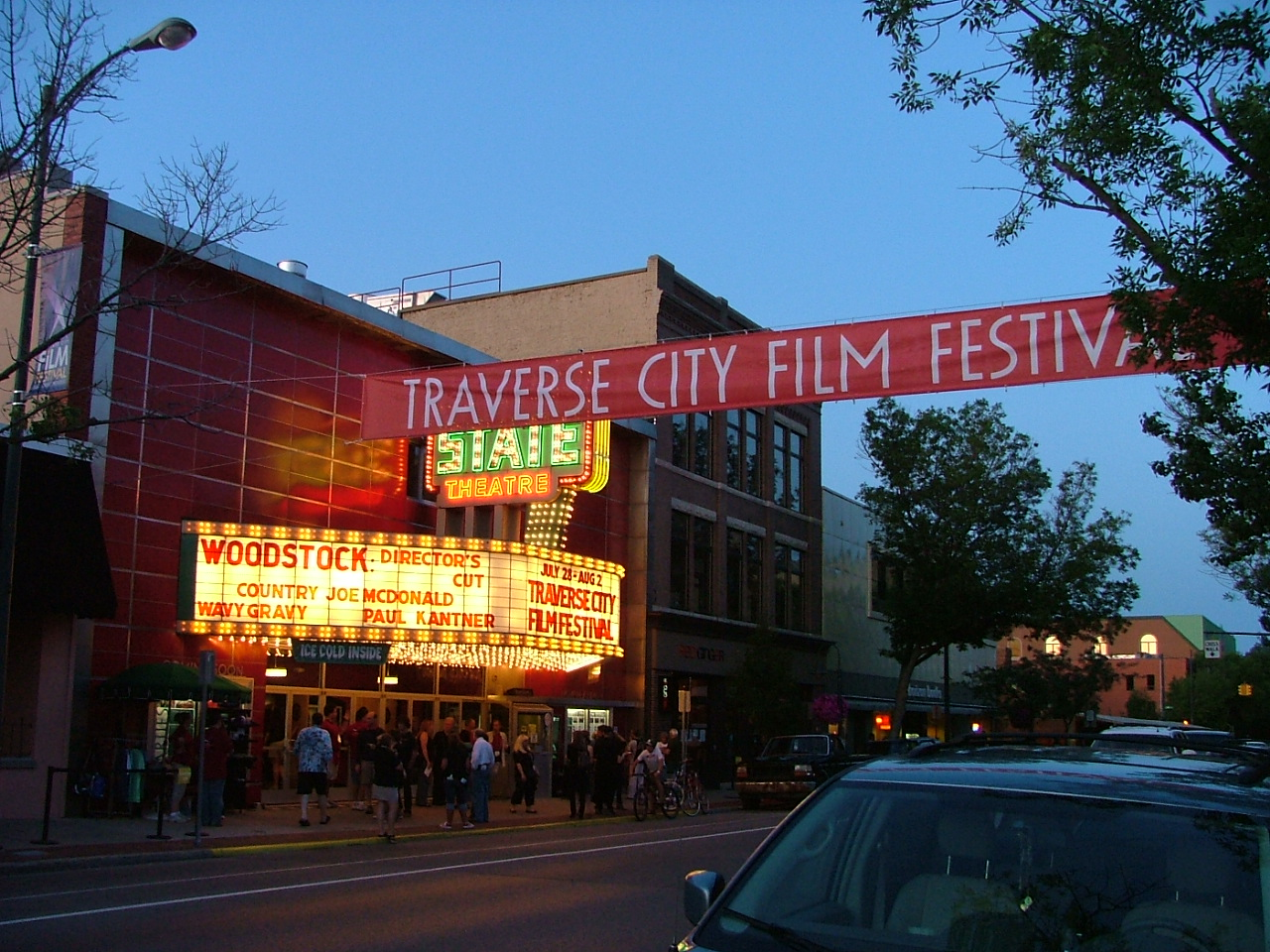
State Theatre, Traverse City

Temple Theatre, Saginaw
