= River Raisin Centre for the Arts =

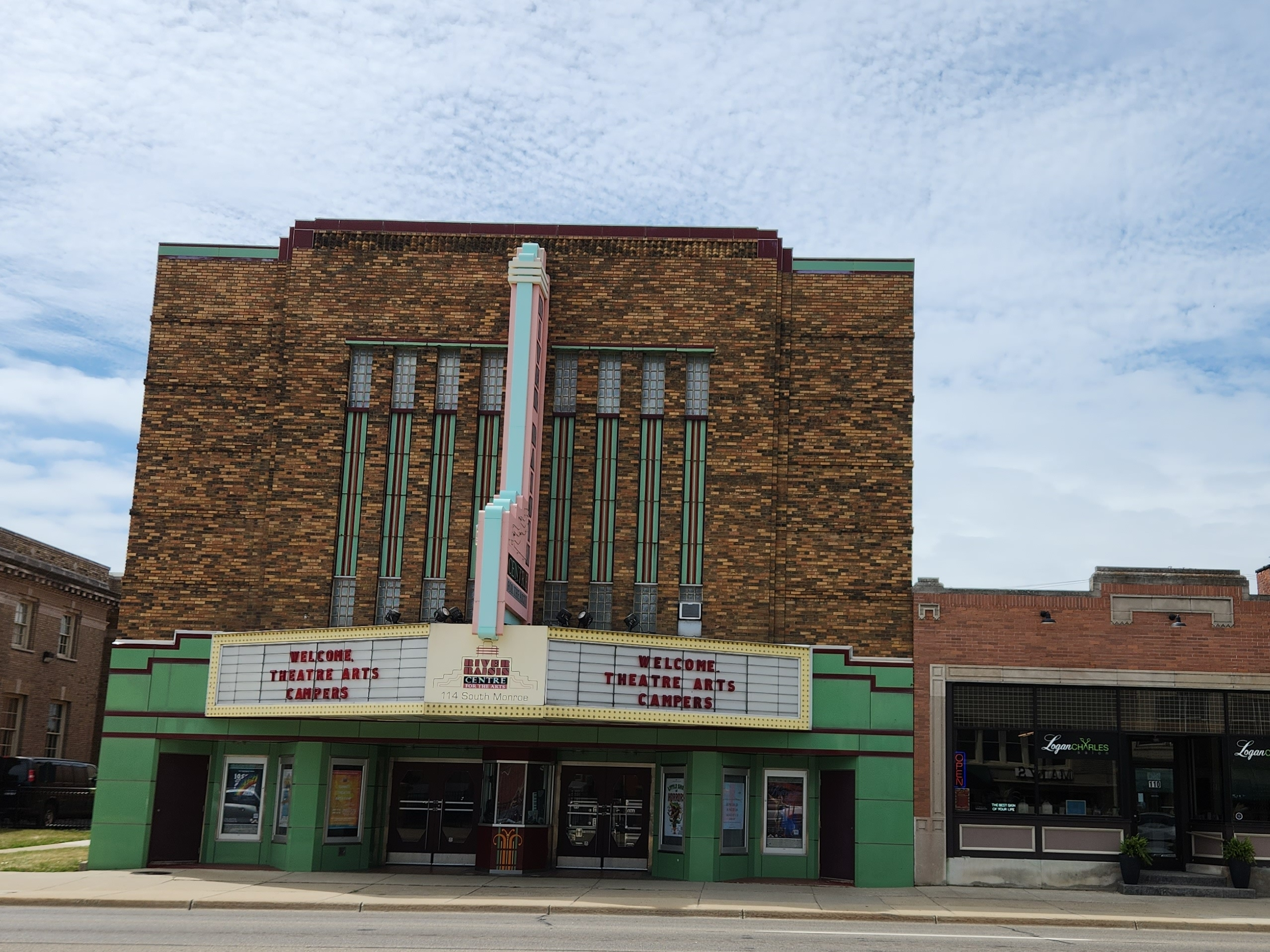
- Interactive map of River Raisin Centre for the Arts
- Former names: Monroe Theatre (1938–1988)
- Address: 114 South Monroe Street; Monroe, Michigan; United States
- Coordinates: 41.91547°N 83.39890°W
- Public transit: Lake Erie Transit

Construction
- Opened: 1938

Website
- riverraisincentre.org

The River Raisin Centre for the Arts is a community performing arts center and former movie theater in Monroe, Michigan. It occupies the historic Art Deco-styled Monroe Theatre, built in 1938. The RRCA was founded in 1987, following the 1975 closure of the Monroe Theatre and a historic preservation effort to save the theatre from demolition.

The RRCA currently hosts multiple performing arts companies and education organizations, including the River Raisin Ballet and the River Raisin Chorale. The River Raisin Centre for the Arts serves the Monroe County region, presenting a year-round season featuring dance, live music, and musical theatre.

== Theater history ==
Cinema history in Monroe dates back to the early 20th century, with the establishment of the Little Gem Theater on East Front Street, the second permanent cinema in the state of Michigan. Joe R. Denniston, builder of the Monroe Theatre, started in the theater business in Paulding, Ohio in 1906. His "Theatorium" in Paulding showed imported French films, using a secondhand Edison projector. Following his success in Ohio, he arrived in Monroe in 1911, and incorporated his company in 1916.

In 1937, J.R. Denniston Theatres operated three theaters in Monroe. The Family Theater was across the street from the future Monroe Theatre, and the Dixie and Majestic were close by in downtown. By early 1937, plans were in the making for the Monroe Theatre. At that time, the Denniston company had become an affiliate of W.S. Butterfield Theatres, a statewide circuit that controlled over 110 theaters at its peak. The Monroe Theatre was Butterfield's 100th house.

The Denniston company paid $12,000 (equivalent to $269,000 in 2025) for the land, and in total invested over $250,000 (over $5.6 million in 2025) for the construction of the theatre. The Monroe Theatre seated 1250, and featured a Mirrophonic sound system, described by Boxoffice magazine as "mechanically modern in the minutest detail." Advertising emphasized the comfort and modernity of the theatre, highlighting the screen, the ventilation systems, and the sound. The Monroe Theatre opened in early 1938.

J.R. Denniston was an active figure in the local and regional film industry, and his commentary was regularly published in national industry publications, including Boxoffice and Variety. Denniston was notably opposed to showing film noir, writing in 1951 that he "would suggest all production of crime pictures be discontinued by producers." A contemporary analysis by Eddie Muller attributes his troubles in the business not to film noir, but to generally decreasing ticket sales.

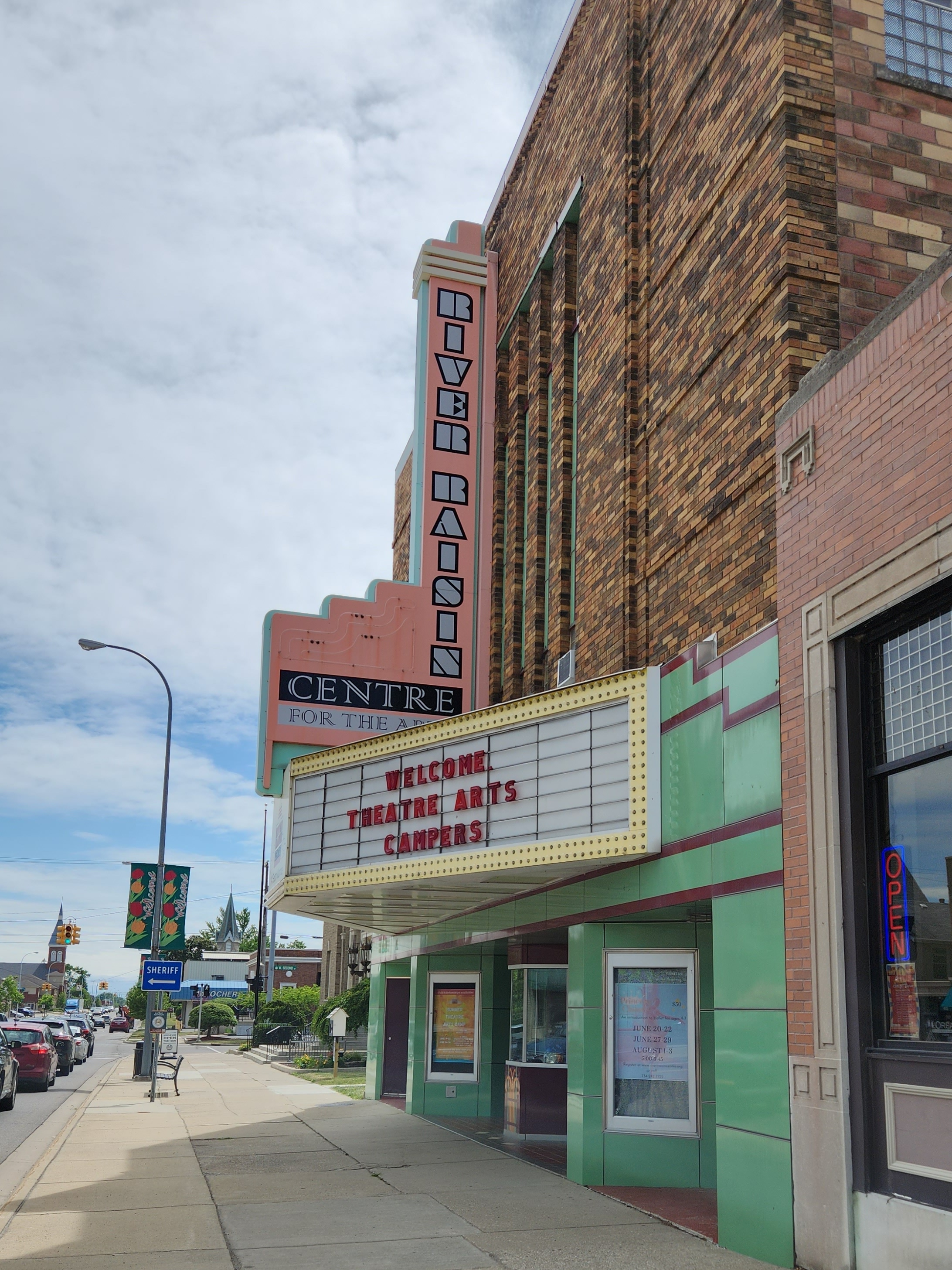
Detail of the marquee

By 1959, the Denniston company was down to two theaters in Monroe, the other being the Denniston Drive-In. The Monroe Theatre was renovated in 1961 in the face of growing competition, but it was unable to sustain itself as a cinema. The Monroe Theatre closed in 1975, and saw brief uses for church services and rock concerts in the decade following.

Members of the Monroe Kiwanis Club advocated for the theatre's restoration, but the club was unable to take on the project itself. The Monroe Downtown Development Authority purchased the building from Denniston for $50,000, with the financial and organizational assistance of the Kiwanis Club. The River Raisin Centre for the Arts board was incorporated in 1987, and quickly began a major renovation project. This project included the installation of a larger thrust stage for live performances.

The River Raisin Centre for the Arts reopened in October 1989 with the "Harvest Happenings '89" festival. The organization grew in the early 1990s, adding its first professional executive director in 1996, and expanding steadily with new performances and education programs. A new sprung-floor stage was installed in 2019 with the assistance of a grant from the State of Michigan, which also supported the restoration of the theater's 1953-vintage Baldwin piano.

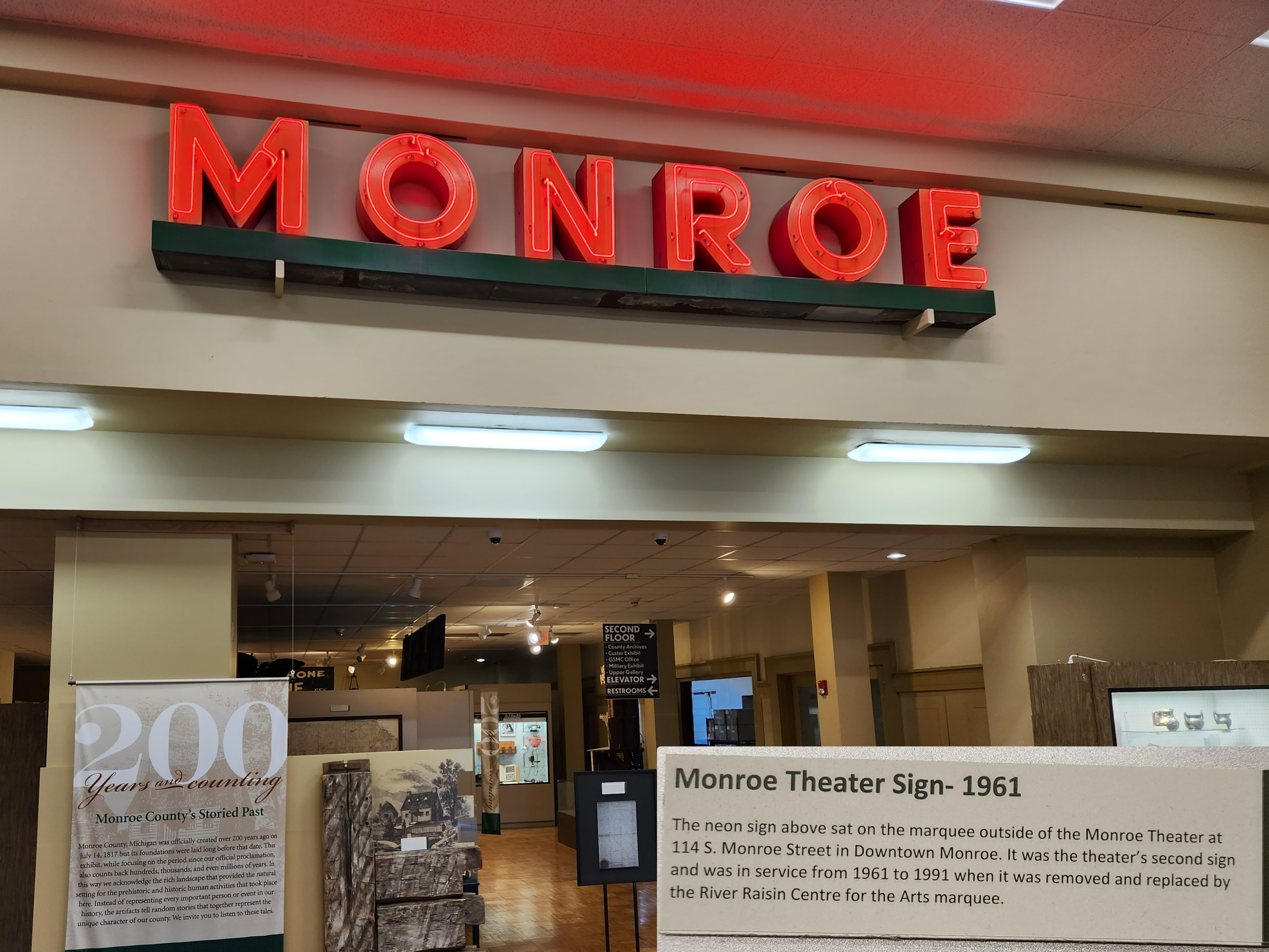
Neon sign from the 1961–1991 Monroe Theatre marquee

A portion of the "Monroe" marquee sign, in service from 1961 to 1991, was preserved when the RRCA marquee was installed. The neon sign is currently on display at the Monroe County Historical Museum.

== Programming ==
The RRCA is home to a variety of arts organizations. The first was the Monroe Community Players, which was previously housed in the Family Theatre, also a former Denniston house. The Monroe Community Players currently occupy a space at the Mall of Monroe.

As of 2023, resident companies at the River Raisin Centre for the Arts include the River Raisin Ballet, the Monroe School of Performing Arts, the River Raisin Chorus (a Sweet Adelines affiliate), and the River Raisin Repertory Company. The RRCA offers education programming in dance, music, and drama, including summer camps and outreach programs.

== Organization ==
River Raisin Centre for the Arts Inc. is a 501(c)(3) nonprofit organization, founded in 1987. The RRCA is governed by a five-member board.
