= State Theatre (Bay City, Michigan) =

Movie theater in Michigan, USA

- Interactive map of State Theatre
- Address: 913 Washington Ave; Bay City, Michigan; United States
- Coordinates: 43.5997°N 83.8877°W
- Public transit: Bay Metro

Construction
- Opened: September 8, 1908; 117 years ago

Website
- statetheatrebaycity.com

The State Theatre is a single-screen movie theater located in Bay City, Michigan. Built in 1908 during the booming lumbering era in Michigan, the State Theatre was originally known as the Bijou, and was one of the many vaudeville and burlesque houses in Bay City. In 1930 the theater was renovated and reopened as the "Bay."

The ownership and the name of the theater changed over the years until July 2000, when the theater was purchased by the Bay City Downtown Development Authority who restored the Mayan motif marquee. The theatre closed again in 2024 but reopened under new ownership later that year.

== History ==
The State's predecessor was the old Bijou Theatre, located on the ground floor of the Ridotto Block at 520 Center Avenue. The old Bijou opened in October 1905, and was managed by Dan J. Pilmore. The old Bijou opened as a vaudeville house, home to a variety of live touring acts. Admission prices ranged from 5 to 15 cents, equivalent to $1.79–$5.37 in 2025.

The current State Theatre opened as the new Bijou Theatre, part of "Colonel" W.S. Butterfield's Bijou circuit. The Bijou circuit included vaudeville theaters across Michigan controlled by Butterfield, based in Battle Creek. The size of the Bijou circuit permitted economies of scale for Colonel Butterfield, who could book higher-quality acts for longer runs, with lower travel expenses.

Plans for the new Bijou were drawn up in early 1907, with the cost of construction estimated at $70,000, equivalent to $2,400,000 in 2025. The new Bijou opened on September 8, 1908 with a program of four live acts and a "Bijouscope" motion picture presentation. The old and new Bijou were a key part of the growing entertainment business in Bay City, which by 1913 featured 13 theaters.

The Bijou was renamed the Orpheum in 1920, and transitioned from vaudeville to full-length motion pictures in 1926. Sound films were introduced in 1928, beginning with a showing of Uncle Tom's Cabin featuring a Movietone soundtrack.

The Orpheum became the Bay Theatre in 1930, following an extensive remodeling. The renovation redecorated the theatre in Mayan Revival style, featuring a large Mayan headdress-themed marquee and corresponding interior decor. The renovation was designed by C. Howard Crane, and shared stylistic elements with the contemporaneous Fox Theatre in Detroit. The renovation was costly, at $100,000, equivalent to $1,930,000 in 2025. The Bay opened in October 1930, with an inaugural showing of Madam Satan.

Much of the Mayan decor was removed or covered in 1957 during another remodeling, which renamed the theatre the State. The State was operated by the Butterfield circuit until 1984, when it and other Butterfield houses were sold to GKC Theatres. In 1991, GKC closed the theatre and sold it to Tim O'Brien, operator of two independent cinemas in the Saginaw area.

The State in 1980

O'Brien showed popular, mostly 2nd run films at the State for $2 admission price until 2000, when it closed again due to low attendance, and Mr. O'Brien redirected his efforts to the Vassar Theatre in nearby Vassar Michigan. The property reverted to the Bay City Downtown Development Authority, which sought a non-profit operator for the theatre.

== Restoration ==
A volunteer group, the Friends of the State Theatre, was organized to operate and renovate the theatre. Renovations to the theater began in 2000 with the replacement of the roof, carpet, and stage curtains, and seating. The hardwood floors were refinished, and the lighting and sound systems were updated. A new stage was created in front of the existing screen, to support the addition of live shows to the theatre's schedule.

Detail of the new marquee

The elaborate internal paint theme was restored in 2005. The color scheme was recreated by John Canning & Company of Cheshire, Connecticut, with the intention of exactly matching the 1930 style.

A digital projector and a new Mayan-themed marquee were installed in 2008. The new marquee design was created and built by Eric E. Larsen of Auburn at a cost of $220,000. The marquee's decoration features a stylized figure with a headdress, in keeping with the original Mayan theme. The new marquee received the International Sign Association's 2009 Traditional/Historic Sign Award.

== Financial difficulties, closure, and sale ==
The State Theatre board fired longtime chief operating officer Mike Bacigalupo in November 2023, after news emerged that the State was unable to pay debts to artists and service providers for shows it sponsored in summer 2023. As of March 2024, an FBI investigation is ongoing.

The State Theatre closed on March 1, 2024, and declared bankruptcy days later. It was purchased in bankruptcy by businessman Jordan Dice for $960,000 and reopened in October 2024.
