= Walter Scott Butterfield =

American vaudeville promoter and theatre manager (1867–1936)

W. S. Butterfield
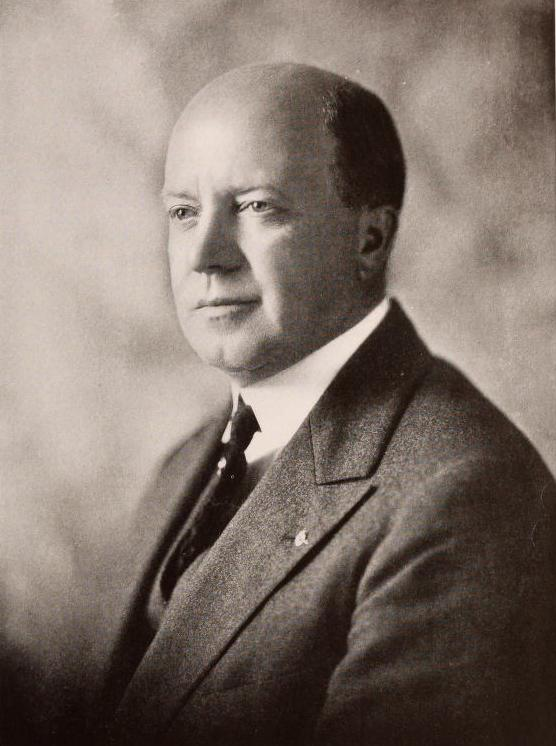
- Portrait of Butterfield ca. 1925
- Born: April 25, 1867; Connersville, Indiana, U.S.
- Died: April 23, 1936 (aged 68); Boston, Massachusetts, U.S.
- Burial place: Oak Hill Cemetery, Battle Creek, Michigan
- Occupation: Theater manager

Walter Scott "Colonel W. S." Butterfield (April 25, 1867 – April 23, 1936) was an American vaudeville promoter and theater manager. His business, W. S. Butterfield Theatres, operated over 100 theatres at its peak, with locations throughout the Lower Peninsula of Michigan.

== Early life ==
Walter Scott Butterfield was born in Connersville, Indiana in 1867. His family moved to Columbus, Ohio when he was a child, for his father to take a job at the Ohio State Journal. Butterfield intended to start a career in the newspaper business, but instead began working at theaters in Columbus.

== Personal life ==
Butterfield married Maria Louise Mills in 1891, with whom he had a daughter, Mitties Louise Butterfield.

In 1903, Butterfield met Caroline Kelley McCord, a performer in the "Buster Brown" show that he was promoting. They married that year, and had four daughters: Caroline Hamilton Butterfield, Laura McCord Butterfield, Julia Scott Butterfield, and Helen Butterfield. The couple divorced in 1921 due to Walter's intense work schedule.

Butterfield married Irene Dailey in 1923. Their daughter Anne was born in 1930.

Butterfield's nickname of "Colonel" was not connected to any military service. One account claimed that Butterfield received the title from his acquaintance with the officers at Camp Custer during World War I, and another account credits it to an offhand introduction at a banquet. Friends and associates continued the nickname for the rest of his life.

== Career ==
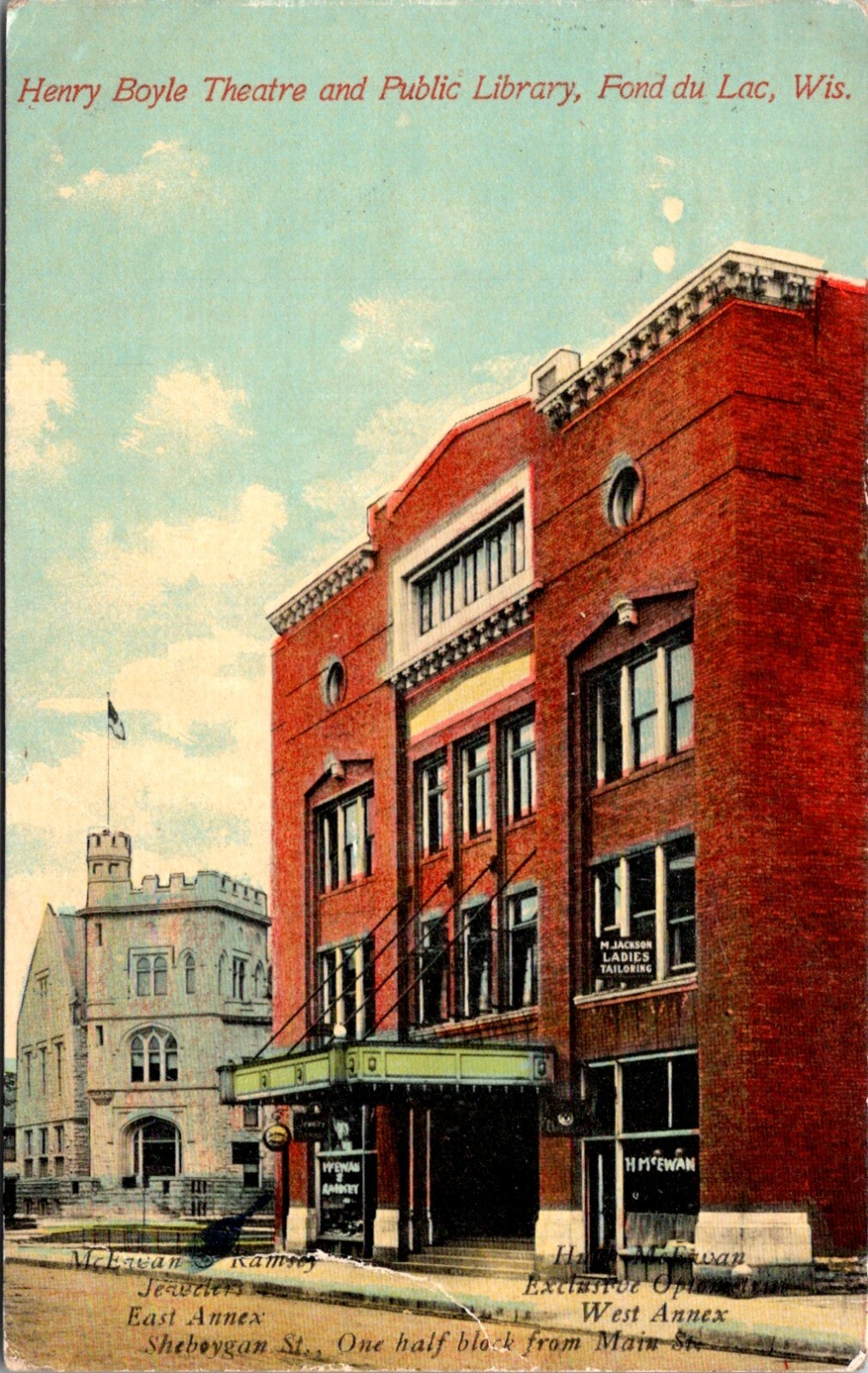
Butterfield promoted the construction of the Henry Boyle Theatre in Fond du Lac, Wisconsin, pictured in 1915

Butterfield started in the vaudeville and theater business in entry-level jobs at several Columbus theaters. He first worked at the Comstock Theater, and later the Grand Opera House.

Butterfield moved to Chicago with Maria Louise Mills in 1891, where he worked as the treasurer of the Chicago Academy of Music. In Chicago, Butterfield met Charles E. Blaney, a theatrical tour producer, and spent over ten years in his organization, preparing advances for touring shows. Butterfield's work with Blaney included the tours of "An American Gentleman" and a play adaptation of "Buster Brown."

Butterfield's first solo endeavor in show business was in Fond du Lac, Wisconsin, where he promoted the construction of the Henry Boyle Theatre. After his work in Fond du Lac, Butterfield was introduced to the West Michigan region by Pantages circuit executive Walter Keefe. In 1905, Butterfield took over the management of the Hamblin Opera House in Battle Creek, Michigan, renaming it the Bijou, and booking vaudeville acts.

Battle Creek's Bijou Theater was the first of a circuit of Bijou houses in Michigan, managed by Butterfield. His circuit was attractive to performers, who could book multiple weeks of shows at a time. By 1924, he controlled 21 theaters in Michigan.

Outside the theater business, Butterfield was involved in the Gull Lake resort community in Kalamazoo County from the 1920s to his death. Butterfield purchased the Allendale resort on the southeast shore of Gull Lake in the aftermath of World War I, in the resort's final years of operation. The Allendale was in decline by that time, affected by the end of direct interurban service and the changing preferences of vacationers. The Allendale dance hall, the centerpiece of the resort, was relocated twice, and now stands on the north side of the lake as a dairy barn. The Allendale property is now a collection of residential properties on East Gull Lake Drive in Ross Township.

== Death and legacy ==
Butterfield died in Boston in 1936 after a short illness. He is buried at Oak Hill Cemetery in Battle Creek.

At its peak, W. S. Butterfield Theatres operated over 110 theaters across Michigan. The Butterfield circuit continued in operation until the 1980s, when it was bought out by George Kerasotes. Many former Butterfield theaters still operate today across Michigan, from the Mayan-themed State in Bay City, to the opulent Michigan in Ann Arbor, to the State in Kalamazoo, an atmospheric theatre.
