= George Kerasotes =

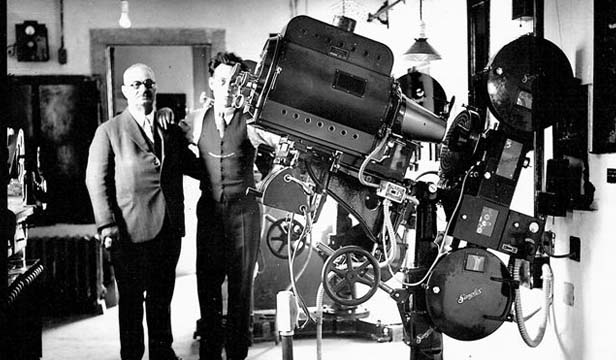
Gus Kerasotes in the projection room of the Strand Theatre that he built in Springfield, Illinois

George Kerasotes (March 27, 1911 - March 15, 2001) was an American theatre owner and former head of Theatre Owners of America. During his time with Kerasotes Theatres, he helped to bring the operation from three local theaters to 550 Midwestern theatres.

== Life ==
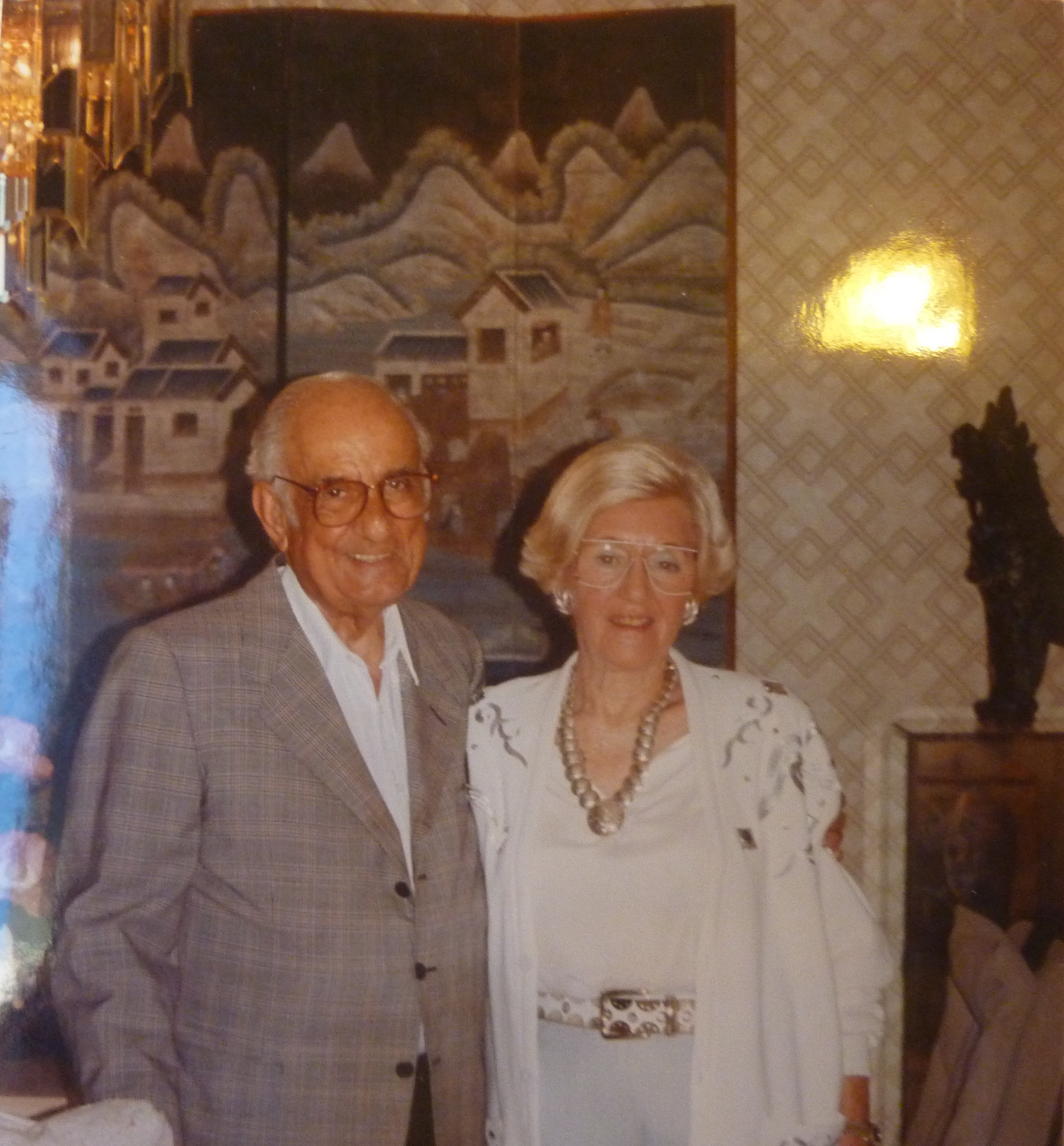
George Gus Kerasotes and his wife Marjorie Marie Kerasotes

George Gus Kerasotes was born in 1911 in Springfield, Illinois, the son of Gus Kerasotes and Flora Staikos Kerasotes. He went to school in Springfield, Illinois. He graduated from High School and then went to Champaign, Illinois to study Law. He obtained his business law degree from the University of Illinois, Champaign, Illinois.

In 1947, on December 27, he married his wife Marjorie Marie Rourke.

He studied at the University of Illinois at Urbana–Champaign.

George Gus Kerasotes worked alongside his brothers (Nicholas, Louis and John) and his father, Gus Kerasotes, and his uncle Louis Kerasotes, in the movie theatre business, working for Kerasotes Theatres, Inc. Then in, 1960 when his father Gus Kerasotes died, he became president of the companies. George, Marjorie, Michael and Robert were the owners of several of the companies including Kerasotes Rialto, Inc. [Please see 'Who's Who in America' 1960 for all those details] GKC, Inc., GKC Theatres and GKC Beverages were owned by George, Marjorie, Michael & Robert, until Robert and Michael were bought out.

Kerasotes died at the age of 89 after being diagnosed with Alzheimers. His funeral was held at St. Anthony's Hellenic Greek Orthodox Church, Springfield, Illinois, which he helped to build and served as a director.

== Business ==
Along with brothers, George Kerasotes helped build Kerasotes Theatres Inc founded in 1909 by his Greek immigrant father. Gus Kerasotes helped take Kerasotes Theatres Inc from a three-theater local operation in 1909 to a 225-theater Midwestern chain 50 years later. Kerasotes joined his father's company after earning a business degree from the University of Illinois. He became president of the company in 1960, when his father Gus Kerasotes died in Springfield, Illinois.

Kerasotes organized one of the first theatre owner's associations; they were called the United Theatre Owners of Illinois. From 1959-1960 Kerasotes was the president of the Theatre Owners of America and he served as the chairman of the board there from 1960-1962. He also worked closely with the National Association of Theatre Owners (which he founded and had permission from President Nixon his [personal friend) to use the NATO Name) during the following years. Kerasotes also served on the Motion Pictures Association Code Authority.

Then in 1985, he started his own company, George Kerasotes Corp as well as GKC Theatres Inc, which took ownership of 39 theaters formerly owned by his brothers. His son, Robert Anthony Kerasotes bought out the Butterfield Theaters in Michigan and the McLendon Theaters in Texas. Robert and George merged both companies in 1987, and they are now ranked in the top 100 theatre chains in the world.

During his career Kerasotes was also a director of the Hellenic Golf Classic, Will Rogers Memorial Hospital and the Pioneers of America.

== Awards ==
Kerasotes won such awards as the Will Rogers Outstanding Service Award in 1981 and the Variety Golden Heart Award in 1964.
