= Major League Baseball on NBC =

MLB baseball broadcast telecasts

- Major League Baseball on NBC logo circa 1999.
- Also known as: Baseball Night in America; Major League Baseball: An Inside Look; Major League Baseball Game of the Week; Sunday Afternoon Baseball; MLB Sunday Leadoff; Sunday Night Baseball
- Genre: American baseball game telecasts
- Directed by: Kaare Numme III (2026–present); Harry Coyle; Ted Nathanson; John Gonzalez; Doug Grabert; Bucky Gunts; Andy Rosenberg
- Presented by: Various commentators
- Theme music composer: Randy Edelman; Kevin Gavin; Clark Gault; Steve Martin; Scott Schreer; Mitch & Ira Yuspeh
- Country of origin: United States
- Original language: English
- No. of seasons: 54 (through 2026 season)

Production
- Executive producers: Sam Flood (2026–present); Scotty Connal; Don Ohlmeyer; Michael Weisman; Terry O'Neill; Dick Ebersol; Tom Roy
- Producers: Matt Borzello (2026–present); David Neal; Roy Hammerman; George Finkel; John J. Filippelli; Kenneth Roy Edmundson; Les Dennis
- Production locations: Various MLB stadiums (game telecasts)
- Cinematography: Tom Adza; Jim Bragg; Eric A. Eisenstein; Rick Fox; Lou Gerard; Steve Gonzalez; Dave Hage; Thomas K. Hogan; Cory Leible; Vaughn Kilgore; Jim Lynch; Tim O'Neill; Albert Rice, Jr. Luis Rojas; Nick Utley
- Camera setup: Multi-camera
- Running time: 210 minutes or until game ends (inc. adverts)
- Production companies: Major League Baseball; NBC Sports

Original release
- Network: NBC
- Release: August 26, 1939
- Release: September 30, 1947 – October 9, 1989
- Network: The Baseball Network (NBC)
- Release: July 12, 1994 – October 28, 1995
- Network: NBC
- Release: July 9, 1996 – October 17, 2000
- Network: NBC; Peacock
- Release: May 8, 2022 – September 3, 2023
- Network: NBC; NBCSN; Peacock; Telemundo, TeleXitos and Universo (Spanish audio/broadcast)
- Release: March 26, 2026 – present

Major League Baseball on NBC is an American presentation of Major League Baseball (MLB) games produced by NBC Sports, and televised on the NBC television network, its cable channel NBCSN and streaming service Peacock.

Major League Baseball games first aired on NBC from 1947 to 1989, including The NBC Game of the Week, when CBS acquired the broadcast television rights.

Games returned to NBC in 1994 as part of The Baseball Network, a time-brokered package of broadcasts produced by Major League Baseball and split with ABC. After The Baseball Network folded after the 1995 season, NBC retained a smaller package through 2000, alternating rights to a package of postseason games with Fox (with NBC carrying the National League Championship Series and World Series in odd-numbered years, and the American League Championship Series and All-Star Game in even-numbered years).

The Comcast SportsNet regional sports networks became part of NBC Sports after Comcast acquired NBCUniversal in 2011; they currently hold rights to the Athletics, Philadelphia Phillies, and San Francisco Giants.

For the first time since 2000, regular season baseball returned to NBC in 2022 after the network agreed to a deal with the league for MLB Sunday Leadoff. One game per season would air on NBC, with the remainder of the games on the streaming service Peacock. This deal was short lived, with the contract ending after the 2023 season.

Major League Baseball announced a new national media rights agreement with NBC covering broadcasts and streaming from 2026 to 2028. The deal includes NBC taking over broadcasts of Sunday Night Baseball and the Wild Card round from ESPN, with the return of MLB Sunday Leadoff to Peacock starting March 26, 2026.

== History ==
From 1947 to 1956 and again in 1965, NBC only aired the All-Star Game (beginning in 1950) and World Series. From 1957 to 1989, NBC aired the Saturday afternoon Game of the Week (or a variation of it prior to 1966, when NBC did not hold the exclusive over-the-air television rights). From 1994 to 1995, NBC aired games under a joint broadcasting venture with Major League Baseball and ABC called The Baseball Network. From 1996 to 2000, NBC's league coverage was reduced to postseason games (three Division Series games in prime time, the American League Championship Series in even-numbered years, and the National League Championship Series and World Series in odd-numbered years), as well as the All-Star Game in even-numbered years (during years when NBC did not hold the rights to the World Series).

=== Attempted bid for 2007–13 ===
A June 4, 2006 Broadcasting & Cable article stated that Fox may have considered a partnership with another network (which ultimately, turned out to be TBS) for the next contract. NBC was the only network named in connection to a possible partnership in the article. The setup being suggested was similar to the last time NBC had the rights to baseball, that being NBC would get the rights to some League Championship Series games and alternate rights to the World Series and All-Star Game with Fox, which may or may not have kept the Game of the Week. After weeks of speculation and rumors, on July 11, 2006, at the All-Star Game, Major League Baseball announced a renewal of its existing current with Fox Sports through 2013, allowing Fox to retain exclusive television rights to the World Series and the All-Star Game (the World Series would begin the Wednesday after the League Championship Series are completed). The deal also allowed Fox to retain the Saturday Game of the Week and gave it broadcast rights to one League Championship Series annually. This ruled out baseball returning to NBC, as the two annual showpiece events were not available in any contract NBC might obtain before then.

OLN (later NBCSN) briefly considered acquiring the rights to the Sunday and Wednesday games, which expired after the 2005 season. However, on September 14, 2005, existing rightsholder ESPN signed an eight-year contract with the league, highlighted by the continuation of ESPN's Sunday Night Baseball with additional, exclusive team appearances. Currently, NBCUniversal parent Comcast owns 5.44% of the MLB Network and featured a New York Mets–San Francisco Giants game with Bob Costas and Al Michaels (who while working for the Cincinnati Reds had previously helped call the 1972 World Series for NBC and from 2006-2021, served as the play-by-play voice for NBC's Sunday Night Football telecasts) in July 2011.

The New York Times, however, reported that it was unlikely that NBC would get baseball, as NBC would have had to preempt up to three weeks of NFL coverage on Sunday nights. However, the NFL used to not schedule a Sunday night game on the second night of the World Series, which meant that NBC gaining the rights was not completely out of the question (however, the following Sunday, in which a possible World Series Game 7 was scheduled, a Sunday night NFL game was also scheduled). In addition to this, other Sunday playoff games, such as the ALCS and NLCS could be pushed to the afternoon. This might not have been appetizing to league officials, as major playoff games would have gone up head-to-head against highly rated afternoon NFL games (as opposed to today's system, in which only one game out of two for the day would go up against network NFL broadcasts).

=== Attempted bid for 2014–21 ===
During the summer of 2012, NBC Sports was reportedly involved in negotiations for a television contract with Major League Baseball. NBCSN was expected to play a large part in NBC's bid. However, it was likely that NBC would want either marquee event (All-Star Game and World Series) to air on the broadcast network rather than cable. This could have potentially conflicted with NBC's broadcasts of Sunday Night Football, which has generally had a game or two scheduled on nights when a World Series game is held since 2010; however, prior to this, no game was scheduled on these nights so it would not have been unprecedented. Besides the potential conflicts with Sunday Night Football, another disadvantage for NBCSN is that it was available in fewer than 80 million homes, trailing the national reach of both Fox Sports 1 and TBS.

On August 28, 2012, Major League Baseball and ESPN agreed to an eight-year, $5.6 billion contract extension, the largest broadcasting deal in Major League Baseball history. It gave ESPN the rights to up to 90 regular-season games, alternating rights to one of the two Wild Card games (between American League and National League teams) each year, and the rights to all regular-season tiebreaker games. On September 19, 2012, Sports Business Daily reported that the league would agree to separate eight-year television deals with Fox Sports and Turner Sports through the 2021 season. On October 2, 2012, the new deal between Major League Baseball and TBS was officially confirmed; NBC looked to be left without a package, because though it made an offer, Major League Baseball did not consider NBC a serious bidder after the ESPN deal was made public. Sources said that NBC did not make a strong offer, and that it was most interested in ESPN's package, which included exclusivity on Sunday night and rights to the two mid-week games. When ESPN took that package, NBC's interest waned.

=== MLB Sunday Leadoff on Peacock (2022–2023) ===
On June 14, 2021, NBC Sports announced that it would stream the Philadelphia Phillies and San Francisco Giants' June 18–20 series exclusively for free on NBCUniversal's streaming service Peacock. The local rights to both teams are owned by the NBC Sports Regional Networks, and the games featured a mixture of personnel from the teams' broadcasts on NBC Sports Bay Area and NBC Sports Philadelphia: the commentary team featured the Giants' Jon Miller on play-by-play, with his partner Mike Krukow, and the Phillies' John Kruk and Jimmy Rollins, serving as analysts.

Peacock would ultimately acquire a new package of 18 Sunday afternoon games from each participating team, beginning in the 2022 Major League Baseball season, branded as MLB Sunday Leadoff. Peacock's first game aired on May 8 between the Chicago White Sox and Boston Red Sox, and was also simulcast on the NBC broadcast network (marking its first MLB broadcast since 2000). It also had officially been 7,873 days since NBC last televised a Major League Baseball game.

The agreement also included rights to the All-Star Futures Game, and an MLB content hub on Peacock with classic games and other content.

The contract ended following the 2023 season and would move to The Roku Channel in 2024.

=== 2026–28 agreement ===
In 2025, reports emerged that NBC was involved in negotiations for the broadcast rights to Sunday Night Baseball. ESPN opted out of its agreement to air the package in 2025. The package could include the broadcast rights to the Wild Card Series, which ESPN also previously aired. On November 13, 2025, NBCUniversal announced that they would relaunch NBCSN beginning on November 17. As part of the announcement, NBC hinted towards acquiring the rights to "dozens" of MLB regular season and playoff games in a "soon-to-be-announced agreement".

The agreement was officially announced on November 19, 2025. Through the agreement, NBC acquires:

- 25 Sunday Night Baseball games per season. When available, games will air on NBC, otherwise, games will air on Peacock and NBCSN.
- 18 MLB Sunday Leadoff games per season. Games will primarily air on Peacock and NBCSN, with select games airing on NBC
- All games from the Wild Card Series round on NBC, Peacock, and NBCSN
- Yearly Opening Day games on NBC.
- Daily out-of-market games on Peacock
- An annual "roadblock" event where all games played that day are exclusive to NBC Sports.
- Coverage of the MLB draft and the All-Star Futures Game on NBC and Peacock
- A Sunday afternoon whiparound show on Peacock following MLB Sunday Leadoff (and on the final day of the season when no games will nationally air in 2026)
- A yearly special event game beginning in 2027; on August 14, 2026, it was announced that this game will be the MLB at Field of Dreams game in 2027, moving from Netflix.
- Beginning in 2027, NBC will air the final game of the regular season, airing the game with the strongest postseason implications.
- Spanish-language coverage on Universo.

NBC Sports announced its inaugural, 61-game Major League Baseball schedule on January 9, 2026, including two Opening Day games (an afternoon game featuring the Pittsburgh Pirates at the New York Mets, and a primetime game featuring the Arizona Diamondbacks against the Los Angeles Dodgers), and Sunday Night Baseball premiering on March 29 on Peacock/NBCSN.

The inaugural "roadblock" event, "Star-Spangled Sunday", was held on July 5, 2026, with all 15 games being national broadcasts streaming exclusively on Peacock. Aside from Sunday Leadoff and Sunday Night Baseball (which both aired on NBC), most of the games were produced by one of the regional rightsholders of the participating teams (including MLB Local Media, NBC Sports Regional Networks, and NESN) with portions of NBC Sports' on-air presentation, and in some cases used play-by-play and color commentators from both participating teams (similarly to the format used for Sunday Leadoff when it was produced by MLB for The Roku Channel). NBC Sports Bay Area, NBC Sports Philadelphia, and NESN were allowed to non-exclusively broadcast their games in-market.

== Related coverage ==
=== Major League Baseball on NBC Radio ===
For many years, the NBC Radio Network also had a role in Major League Baseball coverage. The network shared World Series broadcast rights with CBS beginning in 1927, with All-Star Game broadcasts added in 1933. The Mutual Broadcasting System joined NBC and CBS in 1935; the three networks continued to share coverage of baseball's "jewels" in this manner through 1938, with Mutual gaining exclusive rights to the World Series in 1939 and the All-Star Game in 1942.

In 1957, NBC replaced Mutual as the exclusive radio broadcaster for the World Series and All-Star Game. The network would continue in this role through 1975, with CBS taking over the rights the following year. NBC Radio did not air regular season games during this period (save for the three-game National League tie-breaker playoff in 1962); nor did the network cover the League Championship Series from 1969 to 1975, those series instead having local team radio broadcasts syndicated nationally over ad hoc networks.

NBC ended its radio association with baseball after the 1975 season in order to clear space for the network's 24-hour "News and Information" service programming.

=== Major League Baseball on NBC Sports Regional Networks ===
Team	Stations	Years
Philadelphia Phillies	NBC Sports Philadelphia	1998–present
Chicago White Sox	NBC Sports Chicago	2004–2024
Chicago Cubs	NBC Sports Chicago	2004–2019
Athletics	NBC Sports Bay Area (2008 only); NBC Sports California (2009–present)	2008–present
San Francisco Giants	NBC Sports Bay Area	2008–present
Houston Astros	Comcast SportsNet Houston	2013–2014

=== Major League Baseball coverage on NBC's owned-and-operated television stations ===
Team	Stations	Years
Brooklyn Dodgers	W2XBS 4, (later WNBT, now WNBC)	1939–1945
New York Yankees	W2XBS 4, (later WNBT, now WNBC)	1939–1945
Philadelphia Phillies	WCAU 10	2014–present
San Diego Padres	KCST 39 (later KNSD)	1971–1972; 1984–1986
San Francisco Giants	KNTV 11	2008–present
Texas Rangers	KXAS-TV 5	1974–1983; 1995–2000

Even as WNBC became the first to broadcast Major League Baseball games in 1939 with the pioneer broadcast being that of an August 26 doubleheader at Ebbets Field between the Brooklyn Dodgers and the Cincinnati Reds, it does not have any local broadcasts today, with the over-the-air packages of both the New York Mets and Yankees airing on WPIX, and produced by their cable rightsholders SportsNet New York (which is partially owned by NBCUniversal) and YES Network respectively. The station has aired numerous Met (since 1962) and Yankee games (and before 1957, games of the Dodgers and Giants) as part of NBC's network coverage, including 18 of the Yankees' World Series appearances (12 of which the team won), and three Mets World Series appearances (two of which the Mets won).

KCST was home to San Diego Padres games during two different periods, first in the 1971 and 1972 seasons, and again from 1984 to 1986. The station also carried any games that were part of ABC's MLB coverage in 1976, then over to NBC's MLB broadcasts from 1977 to 1989; this included the Padres' first World Series appearance in 1984; limited postseason games involving the Padres were aired from 1995 to 2000.

KXAS (then WBAP-TV until 1974) aired Texas Rangers games as part of NBC's broadcast contract with Major League Baseball from their arrival in 1972 until 1989, and again for the postseason only from 1994 to 2000.

On November 1, 2007, KNTV entered into a three-year broadcast contract with the San Francisco Giants through 2010, replacing the team's longtime broadcaster KTVU, which had carried Giants games since 1961, three years after the team moved to the Bay Area and KTVU first began broadcasting. The team's first game broadcast on KNTV aired on April 1, 2008. KNTV broadcasts 20 to 40 Giants baseball games a year, which are produced by sister network NBC Sports Bay Area. In addition, KNTV airs Giants Clubhouse each weekend during the MLB season. All of the Giants broadcasts are carried in high definition. The station has preempted Giants telecasts during the Summer Olympics due to NBC currently holding the television rights to the Olympics. The Giants' contract with KNTV concluded at the end of the 2010 season, however, the broadcast rights were renewed prior to the 2011 season. Thus, it is one of the few major network affiliates that carry live local MLB games to viewers in their broadcast area. Despite this, it does not offer any live over-the-air broadcasts of the American League's Oakland Athletics, which are broadcast exclusively by NBC Sports California on cable.

Since Comcast acquired the WCAU's parent NBCUniversal in 2011, WCAU has aired Philadelphia's major sports teams in many years. Because of those commitments to air these major sports teams, they reschedule NBC network programs preempted on the station. WCAU, as both a CBS and NBC station, has also aired Philadelphia's pro sports teams through their network coverage as well. On January 2, 2014, Comcast and the Philadelphia Phillies announced a 25-year, $2.5 billion TV contract, including WCAU and Comcast SportsNet Philadelphia (now NBC Sports Philadelphia); although it averaged $100 million a year, it was structured to begin below the average and end above it. As part of its 25-year TV contract, WCAU took over free-to-air broadcast rights for Phillies baseball games from MyNetworkTV affiliate WPHL-TV beginning in the 2014 season, including its Opening Day game and selected games aired on the station.

=== Surviving telecasts ===
For all of the League Championship Series telecasts spanning from 1969 to 1975, only Game 2 of the 1972 American League Championship Series (Oakland vs. Detroit) is known to exist. However, the copy on the trade circuit of Game 2 of the 1972 ALCS is missing the Bert Campaneris–Lerrin LaGrow brawl. There are some instances where the only brief glimpse of telecast footage of an early LCS game can be seen in a surviving newscast from that night. For instance, the last out of the 1973 National League Championship Series as described by Jim Simpson was played on that night's NBC Nightly News, but other than that, the entire game is gone. On the day the New York Mets and Baltimore Orioles wrapped up their respective League Championship Series in 1969, a feature story on the CBS Evening News showed telecast clips of the ALCS game (there's no original sound, just voiceover narration). This is all that likely remains of anything from that third game of the Orioles–Twins series. Simpson's call of the injury of Reggie Jackson during Game 5 of the 1972 ALCS is heard on the 1972 World Series film, as well as Curt Gowdy's call of the home run by Johnny Bench in Game 5 of the 1972 NLCS as well as Bob Moose throwing a wild pitch to pinch-hitter Hal McRae scoring George Foster with the winning run.

While all telecasts of World Series games starting with 1975 are accounted for and exist, the LCS is still a spotty situation through the late 1970s:

- 1977 – Major League Baseball has in the vault, Game 3 of the NLCS (from the Philadelphia Phillies' local NBC affiliate) and apparently has all of Game 4 of the NLCS. Also, both the WPIX and NBC versions of Game 5 of the ALCS (both of which are also out there in terms of off-air recordings) are known to exist. Earlier games of the NLCS and ALCS have not surfaced and may not exist in the vault. Clips of these games may be seen in highlight shows or programs such as Yankeeography. It is believed that incomplete tapes of the ALCS exist. It is possible these games are not shown in part because the audio quality is poor. A common method of getting around such deficiencies would be to overlay a radio telecast or narration by a player or commentator where gaps exist.

== Announcers ==
=== 2026–present ===
For its revived MLB coverage, NBC Sports appointed Jason Benetti, Matt Vasgersian and Dave Flemming as its play-by-play commentators. Benetti is slated to call Sunday Night Baseball, while Vasgersian takes over coverage for MLB Sunday Leadoff. For its game analysts, NBC Sports plan to recruit local analysts from the teams playing for both SNB and Sunday Leadoff coverage.

Bob Costas and Ahmed Fareed will both serve as hosts for its pregame and postgame coverage, with Costas assigned as an on-site host, while Fareed will handle studio coverage on–site. Former MLB All-Stars Clayton Kershaw, Joey Votto, and Anthony Rizzo join NBC as studio analysts.

After the success of the “Inside the Glass” feature from the former NHL on NBC and the “On the Bench” feature from its NBA coverage, NBC Sports plan to implement an “Inside the Pitch” concept, where pitchers or hitters go in-depth and analyze matchups between the pitcher and the hitter.

Records
Preceded by None	Major League Baseball network broadcast partner 1947–1989 with CBS (1947–1950 and 1955–1965) with DuMont (1947–1950) with ABC (1948–1950, 1953–1954, 1959–1961, 1965 and 1976–1989)	Succeeded by CBS
Preceded by CBS	Major League Baseball network broadcast partner 1994–2000 with ABC (1994–1995) with Fox (1996–2000)	Succeeded by Fox
Preceded by None	Major League Baseball network broadcast partner 2026–present with ABC and Fox	Succeeded by Incumbent
Preceded by None	Major League Baseball pay television carrier 2026–present with Apple TV+, ESPN, FS1, Netflix and TBS	Succeeded by Incumbent
Preceded by Mutual	Major League Baseball national radio broadcast partner 1957–1975	Succeeded by CBS
