= Bob Lorenz =

American TV anchor

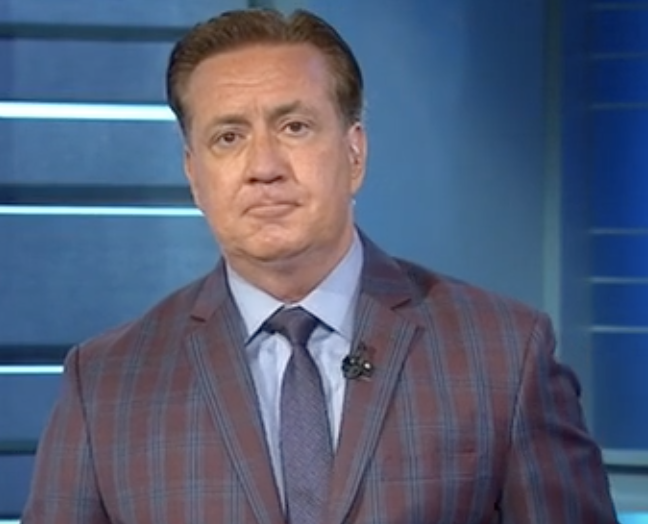
- Lorenz on the YES Network in 2020
- Born: October 2, 1963 (age 62)
- Occupations: Baseball pre-game and post-game analyst
- Employer: New York Yankees

Robert Lorenz (born October 2, 1963) is an American television anchor. He is the primary studio host on the YES Network, and hosts the New York Yankees pregame and postgame shows on YES telecasts, as well as Brooklyn Nets pregame and postgame shows for cablecasts. Lorenz also hosts other shows on YES, including Yankees Hot Stove, a show that tracks the offseason movement of the Yankees and the rest of the teams in MLB. Lorenz has done play-by-play of YES Network's coverage of NCAA football as well as Staten Island Yankees games.

== Career ==
=== Early career ===
Lorenz worked for KIEM-TV in Eureka and WPTV-TV in West Palm Beach. He later joined CNN Sports Illustrated. Also, he worked for TBS and TNT hosting various sporting event studio shows. Lorenz hosted CNN's weekly baseball show, CNN's College Football Preview, College Basketball Preview, College Coach's Corner, and CNN's NFL Preview. He was also a back-up host on Inside the NBA on TNT.

=== YES Network ===
He hosts the New York Yankees Pre-Game Show and the New York Yankees Post-Game Show for New York Yankees telecasts on YES, as well as pregame and postgame shows for Brooklyn Nets cablecasts. Lorenz also hosts other shows on YES, including Yankees Hot Stove, a show that tracks the offseason movements of the Yankees and the rest of the teams in the major leagues. He has also done play-by-play of Staten Island Yankees games and, in 2008, began working play-by-play on Yankees spring training games, which he continued in March 2009. During the 2010 season, Lorenz worked play-by-play for the first time during the regular season, against the Toronto Blue Jays and Seattle Mariners.

Lorenz previously hosted Yogi and a Movie, where he watched baseball-related movies with Hall of Fame catcher Yogi Berra, and hosted This Week in Football, a show focusing on the New York Giants and New York Jets, as well as the rest of the NFL, for six years. He has also been a fill-in host on the interview show CenterStage.

Since John Sterling’s retirement, Lorenz has hosted Yankees Classics on the YES Network.

== Personal life ==
Lorenz briefly attended California State Polytechnic University, Pomona where he played baseball before transferring to the University of Southern California in Los Angeles. He holds a degree in broadcast journalism from USC.
