= Geoffrey Scott =

Geoffrey or Geoff Scott may refer to:

- Geoffrey Scott (architectural historian) (1884–1929), English architectural historian and poet
- Geoffrey Scott (politician) (1938–2021), Canadian politician; Member of Parliament
- Geoffrey Scott (actor) (1942–2021), American actor
- Geoff Scott (footballer) (1956–2018), English professional footballer

== See also ==
- Jeff Scott (born 1980), American college football coach
- Jeff Scott (baseball writer) (1953–2026), American writer for Major League Baseball Productions
