= Jeff Scott (baseball writer) =

American baseball writer (1953–2026)

Jeffrey Llewellyn Scott (November 18, 1953 – September 19, 2026) was an American baseball writer. He was Senior Writer for Major League Baseball Productions from 1988 until the company was dissolved in 2015. Scott wrote more than 1100 television shows for various networks including Fox, ESPN, MLB Network, YES Network, ABC, NBC, NESN, Spike, FS1, NBC Sports, and A&E. Included amongst those shows is a Cal Ripken-like streak of writing 450 consecutive episodes of This Week in Baseball (TWIB.) In addition, he wrote the scripts for nearly 150 DVDs and home videos including more than 26 Official World Series films. He wrote for and directed on-camera and record sessions with many celebrities, athletes, broadcasters and voiceover talents. His writing earned him 16 New York Emmy Awards, a Boston/New England Emmy Award, 17 National Sports Emmy nominations, a Cine Golden Eagle award, and various other awards and honors some of which date back to his days writing for newspapers.

== Early years ==
Scott was born in Philadelphia on November 18, 1953, and raised in Hilltown, Bucks County, Pennsylvania. He graduated from Penn Ridge High School and attended what is now West Chester University.

== Early career ==
Scott's writing career began in the early 1970s as a part-time sports writer for The Intelligencer, in Doylestown, Pennsylvania. In 1975 he was hired as sports editor and feature writer for the News-Herald in Perkasie – a position he held for the next five years. Following a brief period in which he drove across the country for fun and then worked as a truck driver, deejay and day cook, he landed a job at The Free Press in Quakertown, Pennsylvania. There he served as a columnist, medical writer, movie reviewer and editor of a weekly entertainment magazine. In 1981, when Free Press publisher Charles Meredith III underwent quadruple bypass surgery, Scott received permission to observe the operation directly over Meredith’s chest. He then wrote a series of award-winning articles about it for The Free Press and then adapted the series for a feature story that appeared in Philadelphia Magazine in October 1981.

In the summer of 1983, producer/director Mike Tollin and Gary Cohen (Halcyon Days Productions) hired him to write This is the USFL, the weekly highlight show for the new United States Football League, which aired on ABC from 1983-1985. Once the USFL disbanded, Scott remained with Halcyon Days Productions for several years as a freelance writer and producer. It was during this time that he and Tollin followed Phillies slugger Mike Schmidt during his quest for 500 home runs and then produced a film that chronicled the slugger’s effort. Scott was also an integral part of various other shows and videos including Men of October, Legacy, The Best of the USFL and Michael Bolton’s Winning Softball. In the late 1980s, Scott wrote more than 1,000 one-minute radio shows for John Madden’s Sports Quiz, John Madden’s Sports Calendar and Bob Costas’ Sports Flashback – before landing a job with MLB Productions writing for baseball television and the VCR/DVD industry.

== Major League Baseball Productions ==
Scott joined MLB Productions (through Phoenix Communications) in 1988 as the writer for ESPN’s Major League Baseball Magazine – one of the first independently produced programs for the fledgling network. Over the next four years Scott wrote 176 episodes of the widely acclaimed program which was narrated by Warner Fusselle. He began writing This Week in Baseball – the longest running sports anthology program in television history – in 1992, for Mel Allen, the legendary announcer and original voice of TWIB. After the Hall of Fame broadcaster died in 1996, Scott wrote for another Hall of Famer, Ozzie Smith, who hosted the show for two seasons. When the Baseball Commissioner’s office took back MLB Productions from Phoenix Communications in 1999 Scott began writing for Buzz Brainard, who would narrate TWIB for the next 11 seasons. Scott wrote 450 consecutive episodes of the iconic show before it was discontinued at the end of the 2011 season. Scott wrote and helped create TWIB’s replacement – MLB Player Poll – which debuted on FOX and MLB Network in the spring of 2012. The program – which polls players on a variety of subjects – was hosted by MLB Network personality, Greg Amsinger during its two year run. Scott also helped create, and wrote, MLB162 for Fox Sports 1 in 2014.

He wrote several other weekly shows, as well as every Official World Series Film from 1988-2014 (with the exception of 1999). The World Series Films were often narrated by a celebrity, whom Scott recorded and directed in the voiceover sessions.

Scott played a significant role in the launching of the YES Network, NBC Sports, MLB Network, and Fox Sports 1 by writing fresh programming to help the networks garner audiences in their formative years. The YES Network, launched in 2002, premiered a new biographical documentary series on the most famous Yankee players called the Yankeeography. Scott wrote more than 50 Yankeeography episodes, as well as several other features for the YES Network. MLB Network, launched in 2009, featured a new countdown show – Prime 9 – for which Scott wrote all 68 episodes. He also wrote another 30 programs for MLB Network including behind-the-scenes reality series about both the Phillies (The Pen) and the White Sox (The Club.) He was also the senior writer for the Caught Looking series on NBC Sports during its debut season and Mission October on FS1 in 2013 and 2014.

== Personal life and death ==
Scott lived in Manhattan and Pittsfield, New Jersey, with his wife. He was an avid gardener and a Phillies, Eagles, 76ers and Flyers fan.

Scott died in Flemington, New Jersey, from pulmonary fibrosis on September 19, 2026, at the age of 72.

== Voices ==
The following is a list of some of the men and women whom Scott has written for and directed in recording sessions:

Mel Allen	Bob Costas	E.G. Marshall	Ossie Davis
Richard Dreyfus	Curt Gowdy	Red Barber	Al Michaels
Tim McCarver	Larry Kenney	John Madden	Jack Buck
Chazz Palminteri	Ozzie Smith	Harry Kalas	Len Cariou
Robert Klein	James Brown	Jack Perkins	Michael Bolton
Warner Fusselle	Tim Robbins	Curt Chaplin	Dick Enberg
Hector Elizondo	Charley Steiner	Ray Liotta	Frank Deford
Norm N. Nite	Jeremy Schapp	Denis Leary	Doug Jeffers
Mike Emrick	Joe Torre	Dennis Haysbert	Dennis Quaid
Reggie Jackson	Jim Belushi	Chris Kattan	John Kruk
Michael Clarke Duncan	Ian Eagle	William Petersen	Karl Ravech
Jeff Daniels	Michael Chiklis	Buzz Brainard	Roger Clemens
Amaury Nolasco	Powers Boothe	Michelle Beadle	Matt Damon
Leslie Gudel	Jim Fagan	Billy Bob Thornton	Joe Garagiola
Vin Scully	Matthew Broderick	Bob Uecker	Rob Schneider
John Sterling	Jerry Ferrara	Terence Howard	Dave Winfield
Edward Norton	Esai Morales	Joe Buck	Jimmy Rollins
Mitch Williams	Matt Vasgersian	Marty Brennan	John Goodman
Gary Cohen	Billy Crystal	Mason Pettit	Greg Amsinger
Duane Kuiper	Curtis Granderson	Sean Casey	Dick Brener
Ed Burns	John Hamm	Benjamin Bratt	Bobby Moynihan
Ben Affleck	John Franco	Morgan Spector	John Krasinski
Kevin Burkhardt	Chris Myers	Julie Alexandria	Harold Reynolds

== Notable shows written by Jeff Scott ==
(in no particular order)

This Is The USFL	Prime 9	This Week in Baseball
Major League Baseball Magazine	The Pen	Yankeeography
Letters From Jackie	Cardboard Treasures	Don Zimmer: I've Seen It All
Pride & Perseverance: The Story of the Negro Leagues	Triumph and Tragedy: The 1919 Chicago White Sox	Josh Hamilton: Resurrecting the Dream
MasterCard Presents: Inside the Moments	Generations of Heroes	The Babe & the Billy Goat: Reverse the Curse
The 2006 World Baseball Classic	Baseball Remembers: 9/11	My Father the Ballplayer
1999 A Season of Heroes	Baby Ruth Presents: Take Me Out to the Ballgame	The All Century Team
Baseball: A Latin Passion	When Baseball Went to War	The Science of Swing
Michael Bolton’s Winning Softball	Legacy	The 2008 Official World Series Film
The Mike Schmidt Story	The Best of the USFL	Palestra Pandemonium: The History of the Big Five
Superstar Shortstops	Hank Aaron: Brave Hero	The History of the World Series
MLB Player Poll	Mission October	Caught Looking
Behind The Seams	Being Mariano	Derek Jeter: 2 Witness An Icon
