= Maurice Finkel =

Maurice Finkel may refer to:

- Moishe Finkel (died 1904), prominent figure in the early years of Yiddish theater
- Maurice Herman Finkel (1888–1949), Yiddish theater performer, who later became an architect
