= John J. Filippelli =

American television executive (born 1951)

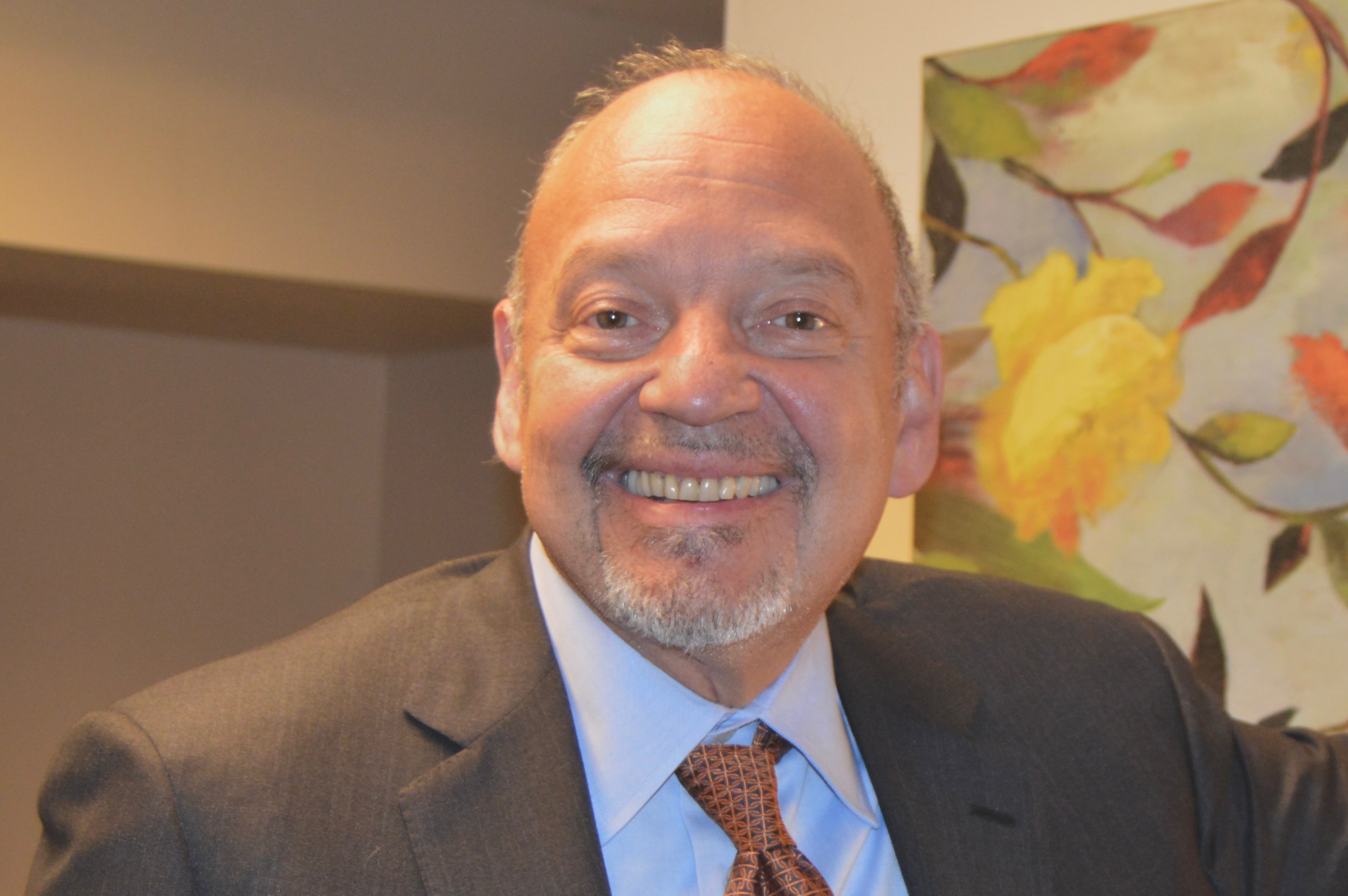
- Born: April 19, 1951 (age 75); Brooklyn, NY, U.S.
- Other name: Flip
- Education: New York City University Richmond College
- Occupations: American sports television executive and producer
- Employer(s): NBC Sports; WWF; The Baseball Network; FOX Sports; ABC Sports; YES Network
- Honours: Executive of the Year - NYU Sports Business Society; Sports Broadcasting Hall of Fame Inductee

John J. Filippelli (born April 19, 1951) is an American sports television executive and producer based in New York City.

== Early life and education ==
John J. Filippelli, commonly known as "Flip," was born in Brooklyn, New York, to Rose Mary and John Filippelli. He has one younger brother. Filippelli's father operated a bar called Doubles, located near Ebbets Field, the home stadium of the Brooklyn Dodgers.

Raised in a neighborhood where baseball players lived and socialized, Filippelli was exposed to the sport from a young age. He began his career in baseball at 16, working as a vendor at Yankee Stadium in the Bronx.

Filippelli attended Abraham Lincoln High School, graduating in 1969. He later attended the City University of New York (CUNY), Richmond, where he earned a bachelor's degree in history in 1974.

== Career ==
=== Beginnings ===
In 1974, Filippelli's interest in television developed during a tour of NBC's headquarters at 30 Rockefeller Plaza in New York City. According to an interview, Filipelli described this visit as "love at first sight" and said this experience strongly influenced his interest in television production.

=== NBC Sports (1974-1990) ===
Filippelli began his career at NBC as a desk assistant in the News division. His first on-air credit was as a desk assistant during the coverage of Richard M. Nixon's resignation in August 1974.

Seeking to move into the sports division, Filippelli secured a meeting with Chet Simmons, the director of programming. During the interview, Simmons tested Filippelli's sports knowledge, asking him to name the starting lineup of the 1961 World Series champion New York Yankees. Filippelli successfully named the entire roster, and so began his career in sports broadcasting. At NBC Sports, he become a lead producer for: Major League Baseball Game of the Week telecasts, the Major League Baseball (MLB) All-Star Game, MLB post-season playoff events, including the League Championship Series and World Series.

Filippelli co-produced the 1986 World Series alongside George Finkel. He also produced the 1988 World Series. Among the sports properties at NBC that Filippelli worked on were the Summer Olympic Games in 1980 and 1988, the Super Bowl, PGA Golf and Wimbledon.

=== WWF (1991- 1992) ===
Vince McMahon hired Filippelli as an executive producer for the World Wrestling Federation (WWF), the forerunner of the World Wrestling Entertainment (WWE). Filippelli was hired to focus on upgrading the production values and presentation of live events under the WWF banner.

=== The Baseball Network (1993-1995) ===
Filippelli was an executive producer for Major League Baseball's The Baseball Network, where he was responsible for producing regionalized games with a dedicated broadcast and production team. In addition, Filippelli collaborated with the executive producers at NBC Sports and ABC Sports to ensure the standardized look of "Baseball Night in America" was consistently applied across network affiliates. Filippelli also led the creative direction of the new prime time package and oversaw the live transmission of programming.

=== FOX Sports (1995-1999) ===
FOX Sports division hired Filippelli in 1995 to lead reimagined Game of the Week telecasts for Major League Baseball. Filippelli's credits include serving as coordinating producer of the FOX's first World Series broadcast in 1996.

Filippelli was involved in several industry firsts at FOX, including the permanent on-screen baseball scorebug and the use of regular-speed instant replays during live broadcasts.

=== ABC Sports (1999-2001) ===
In 1999, Filippelli transitioned from FOX to ABC's sports division. At ABC, he added the Wide World of Sports anthology series to his production resume, which then included a mix of live sporting events such as the Indianapolis 500 and pre-taped specials.

=== YES Network (2001- Present) ===
In 2001, Filippelli was recruited by George M. Steinbrenner to join the startup team of the YES Network (Yankees Entertainment & Sports Network). Filippelli was the company's first hire and was tasked with developing the network's on-air presentation from the ground up. Five months after his hire, the YES Network launched in March 2002.

Filippelli was also involved in the development and production of several original programs, including:

- "Yankeeography," a multi-part documentary series chronicling notable figures and seasons in Yankee history
- "Center Stage" with Michael Kay, a studio interview program
- Live simulcasts of WFAN Radio's drive-time show "Mike and the Mad Dog" and ESPN New York Radio's "The Michael Kay Show"

In February 2025 Filippelli transitioned to become senior advisor at the YES Network after 23 years with the company.

=== Board Member Yogi Berra Museum and Learning Center (Appointed 2026) ===
Source:

== Awards ==
- 2014 - Honorary Doctor of Humane Letters degree from St. Thomas Aquinas College in New York.
- 2017 - Inducted into the Silver Circle by the board of governors of The National Academy of Television Arts & Sciences, New York Chapter, in recognition of his long and meritorious service in the television industry.
- 2018 - Humanitarian Award from The Yogi Berra Museum
- 2018 - Awarded Honorary Board member of the Connecticut Chapter of the Make-A-Wish Foundation after serving for seven years.
- 2021 - Inducted into the Sports Broadcasting Hall of Fame in New York City, an organization that recognizes individuals for their contributions to the sports broadcasting industry.
- 2023 - National Honoree of the Greenwich Old Timers Athletic Association.
- 2025 - Governors’ Award from New York Chapter of the National Academy of Television Arts & Sciences
- 2026 - New York Yankees Yes Network Lifetime Achievement Award

== Personal life ==
Filippelli and his wife, Virginia, were married in 1981. They have two sons.
