= Michigan Theater (Ann Arbor, Michigan) =

Theater in Michigan, United States

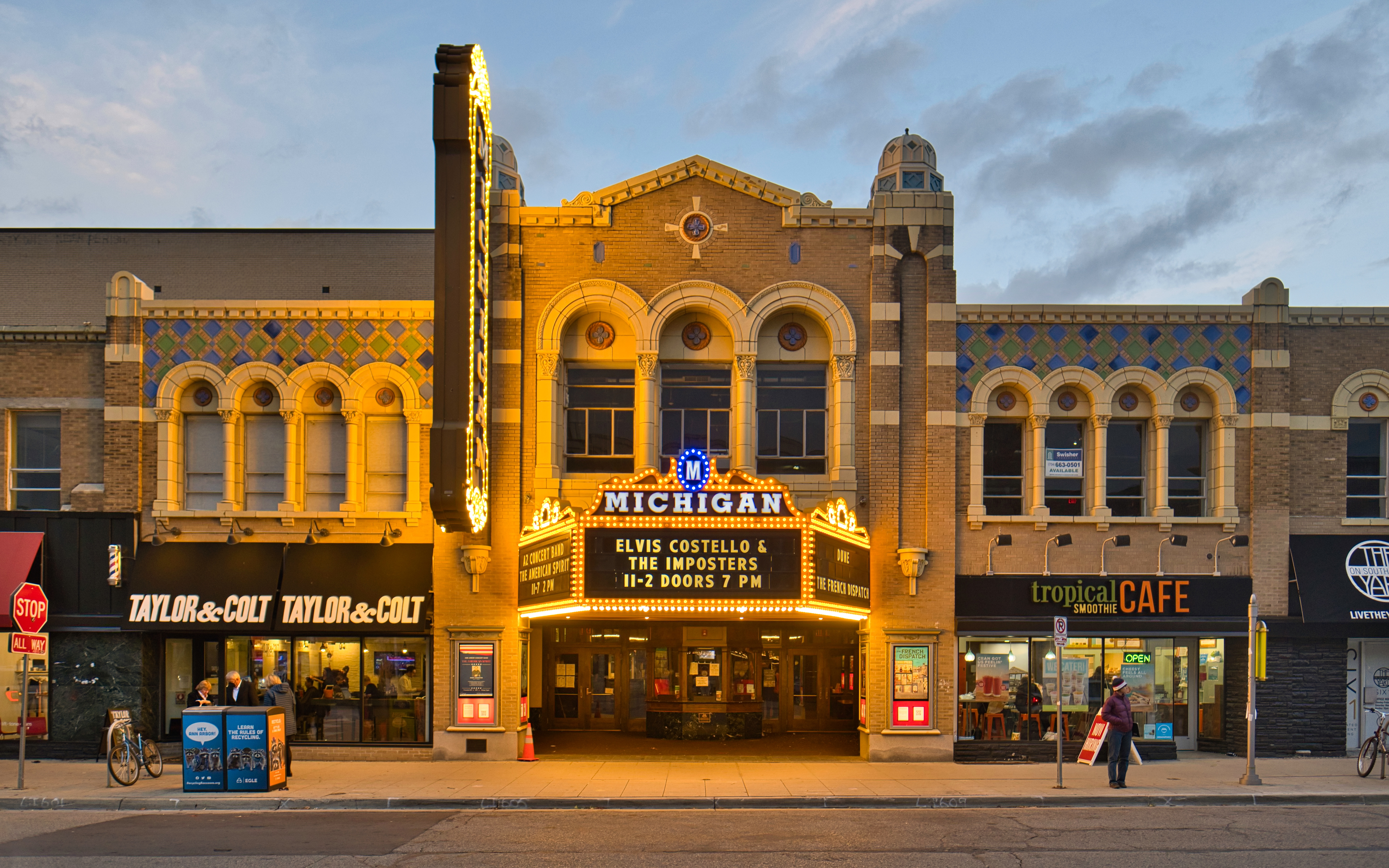
- Interactive map of Michigan Theater
- Address: 603 E. Liberty St., Ann Arbor, Michigan
- Coordinates: 42°16′47″N 83°44′31″W
- Operator: Marquee Arts
- Capacity: 1,610 (Auditorium); 200 (Screening Room)

Construction
- Opened: January 5, 1928; 98 years ago
- Architect: Maurice Herman Finkel

Website
- marquee-arts.org/michigan-theater
- Michigan Theater Building
- U.S. National Register of Historic Places
- Michigan State Historic Site
- Location: 603 E. Liberty St., Ann Arbor, Michigan
- Area: less than one acre
- Built: 1927
- Architectural style: Late-19th and 20th-century revivals, Lombard Romanesque
- NRHP reference No.: 80001917
- Added to NRHP: November 28, 1980

The Michigan Theater is a movie palace in Ann Arbor, Michigan, United States, near the Central Campus of the University of Michigan. It shows independent films and stage productions, and hosts musical concerts.

Designed by Detroit-based architect Maurice Finkel and built in 1927, the historic auditorium seats 1,610 and features the theater's original 1927 Barton Theatre Pipe Organ, orchestra pit, stage, and elaborate architectural details. It was built for and owned by Angelo Poulos and his heirs and was leased until 1978 to the W. S. Butterfield Theatres chain, who managed it along with Butterfield's nearby State Theater. Both theaters are now owned and managed by the non-profit Marquee Arts.

== History ==
The Michigan Theater opened on January 5, 1928, and was at the time the finest theater in Ann Arbor. The theater not only showed movies, but also hosted vaudeville acts, live concerts, and touring stage plays. Over the years, Jack Benny, Bing Crosby, Paul Robeson, and Ethel Barrymore all appeared there.

During a renovation in 1956, many of the original ornate designs were destroyed. After a period of low attendance, the theater was threatened with demolition when its 50-year lease to Butterfield Theatres ran out in 1978, but members of the community and local organists helped raise funds to save and renovate the theater, returning it to its original design. A second screen, the Screening Room, with a state-of-the-art sound system, seating for 200, and the ability to project films digitally, was added in 1999.

The Michigan Theater is the current home of the annual Ann Arbor Film Festival, the Ann Arbor Symphony, and the Ann Arbor Concert Band. The theater has been named the 2006 Outstanding Historic Theatre by the League of Historic American Theaters. The theater also hosts a series of children's stage productions entitled "Not Just For Kids" and a concert series entitled "The Legends of Rock & Roll."

== Barton Organ ==
The Barton theatre pipe organ, catalogued as Opus 245, was built for the Michigan Theater and installed in November 1927, shortly before the theater was opened on January 5, 1928. Of about 7,000 theatre organs built by various companies between the mid-1910s and the early 1930s, the Michigan Barton is one of only about 45 remaining in their original locations. It has three manuals (keyboards) and thirteen separate ranks of pipes, while other area Barton organs of the time have or had ten ranks of pipes. The instrument also has various tuned and untuned percussions and a standard “toy counter” of special effects to aid in film accompaniments. The Barton deluxe/“circus wagon”-style console is situated on a functioning Barton four-poster lift.

The nearly-forgotten Barton organ had fallen into disuse in the 1950s and suffered water damage in the early 1960s. It was repaired and began receiving regular use in the early 1970s, and factored significantly in raising strong community support to save the historic theatre when the original lease expired in 1978. In regular use since that time, the marginally-adequate original blower failed in early 2014 and was rebuilt with a larger custom motor and new impellers. The instrument was completely rebuilt and restored to like-new mechanical and tonal condition by Renaissance Pipe Organs of Ann Arbor between 2018 and 2020, with the console and relay having been updated to reliable solid-state in 2014. The instrument is professionally maintained, and is played regularly by staff organists prior to film screenings and for silent films, making it one of the most-heard theater organs in the country.

== Exterior ==
The Michigan Theater Building is a large, two-story block building, consisting of the Michigan Theater itself and seven retail stores fronting the street, as well as offices above. The building's exterior is clad with brown brick with cement and terra cotta trim. The main section of the facade, three bays wide, contains the entrance to the theater and two flanking stores. This section is Lombard Romanesque in style. The remaining five storefronts are all to one side of the main section, and are considerably plainer. In the plainer section are two slightly recessed storefronts that flank the stair access to the second floor. In each section, the roofline parapet contains the name of the building.

The Romanesque theater entrance contains cream terra cotta columns, arches, and other Romanesque elements on the second floor; these elements on the first floor were lost to the 1956 remodeling. Decorative aprons above the second-floor arcade sections contain green and blue terra cotta, and additional decoration is within the arches.

== Interior ==
=== Lobby ===
The inner lobby still retains original details, including a barrel-vaulted ceiling, Romanesque columns and arch decorations, wood paneling, and wrought-iron balcony and staircase railings.

=== Auditorium ===
The main auditorium, seating 1,610, is used for film screenings and live events. The auditorium contains some of the original detail.

== Gallery ==
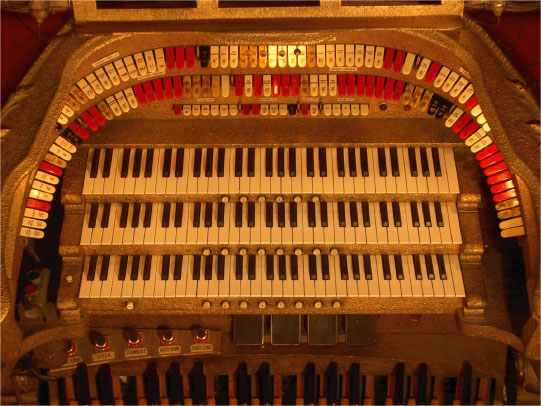
Console of the 3/13 Barton theatre organ

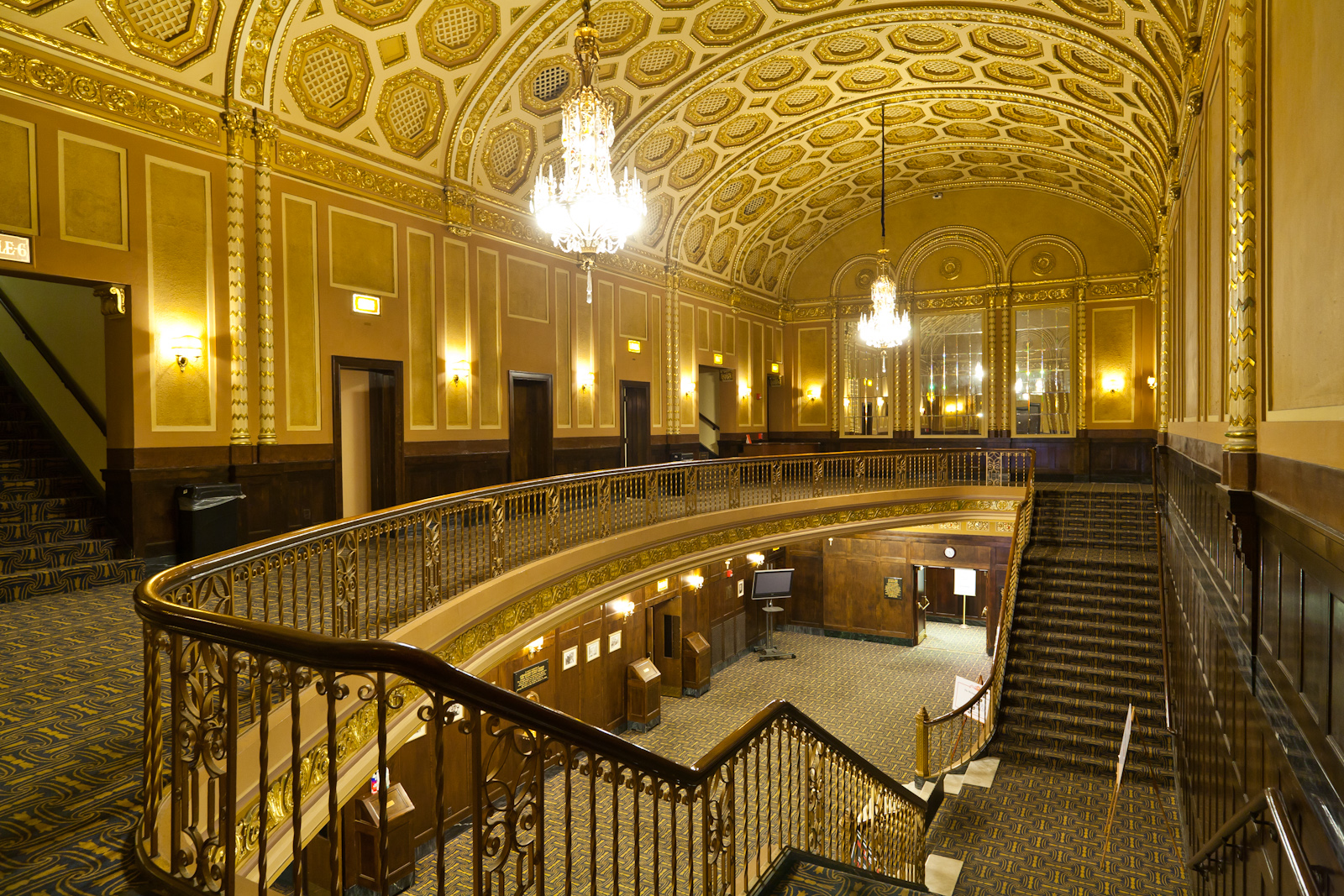
Theater lobby

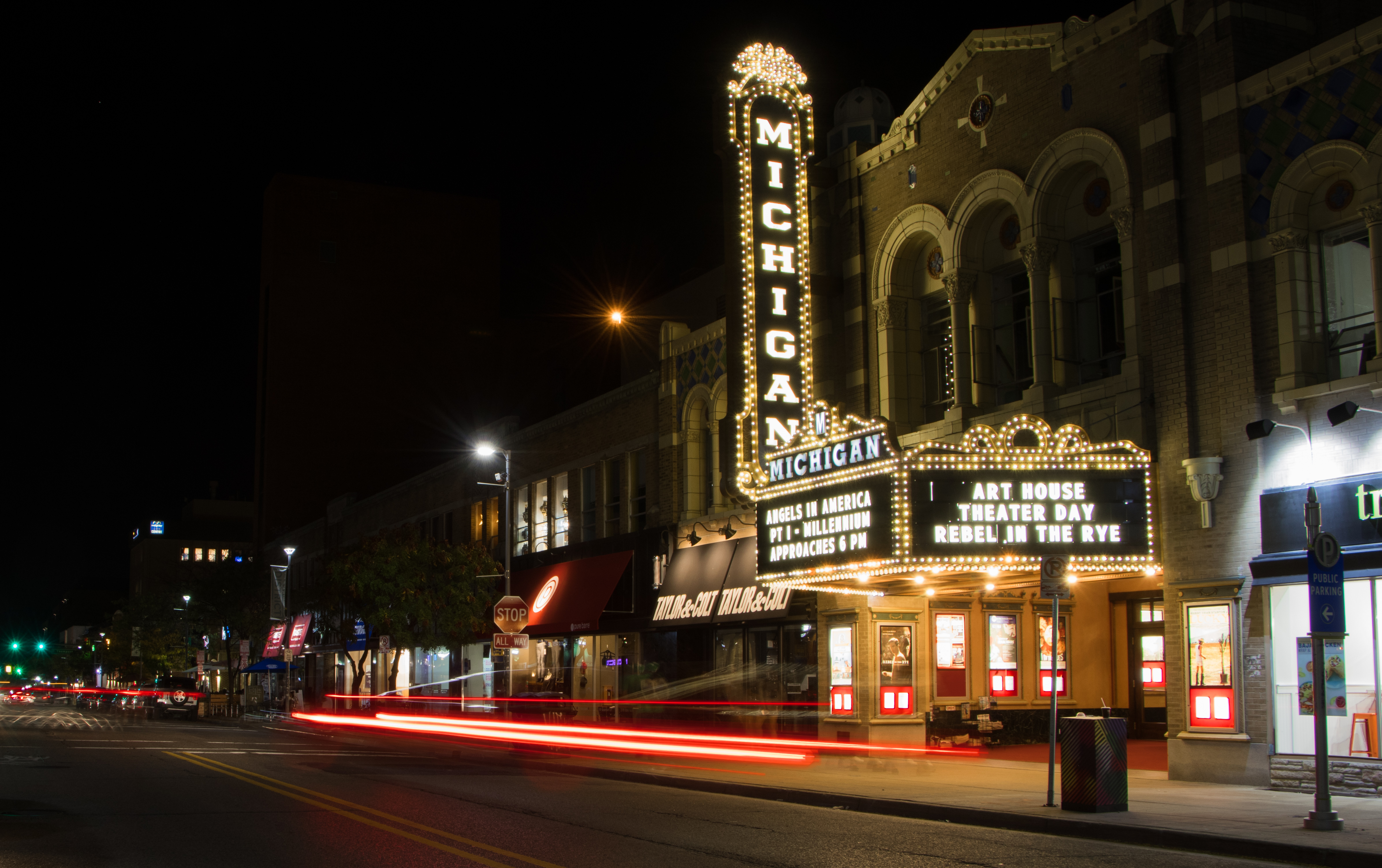
Exterior of the theater at night

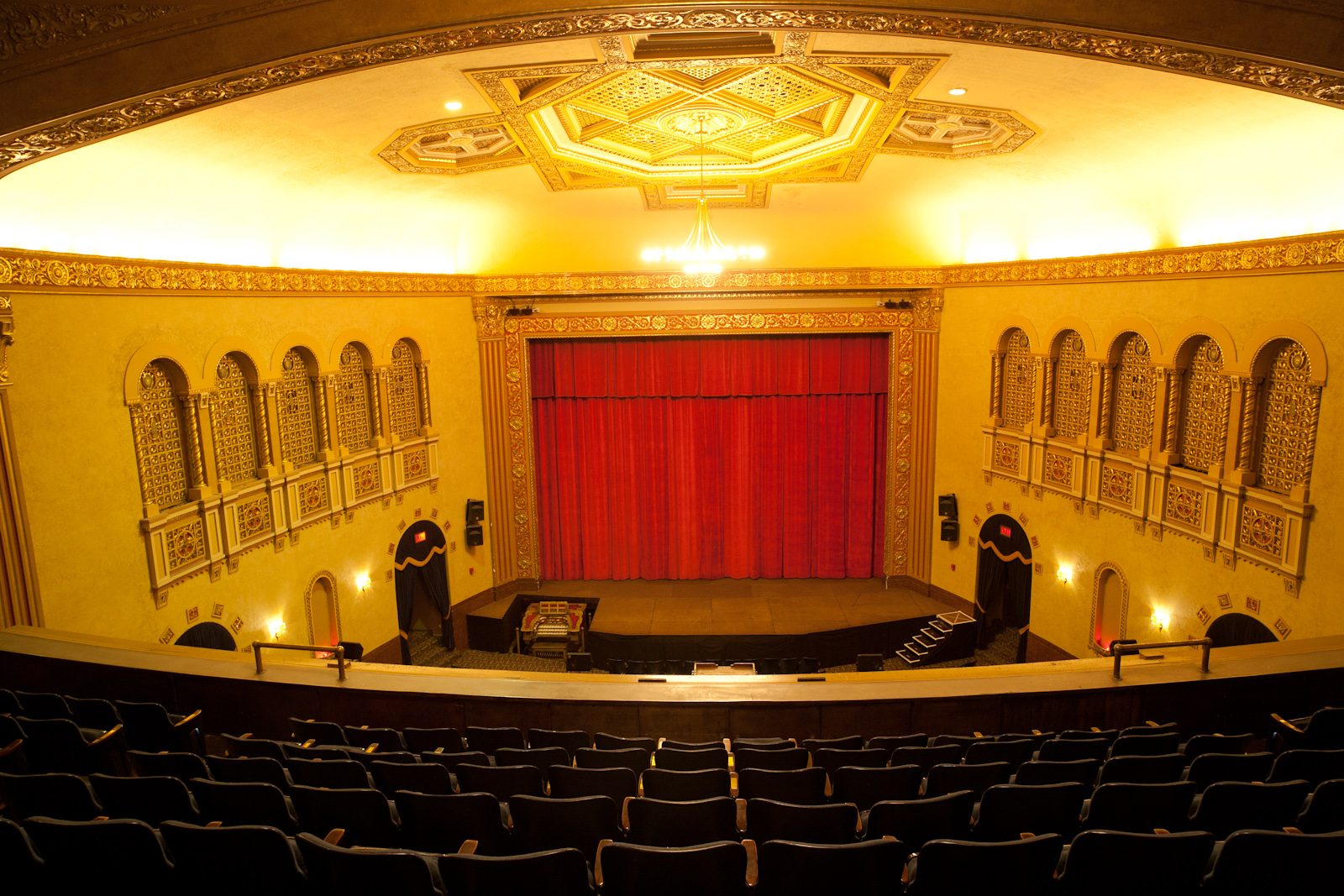
The main auditorium from the balcony
