= Ossian H. Sweet House =

Historic house in Michigan, United States

- U.S. National Register of Historic Places
- Michigan State Historic Site
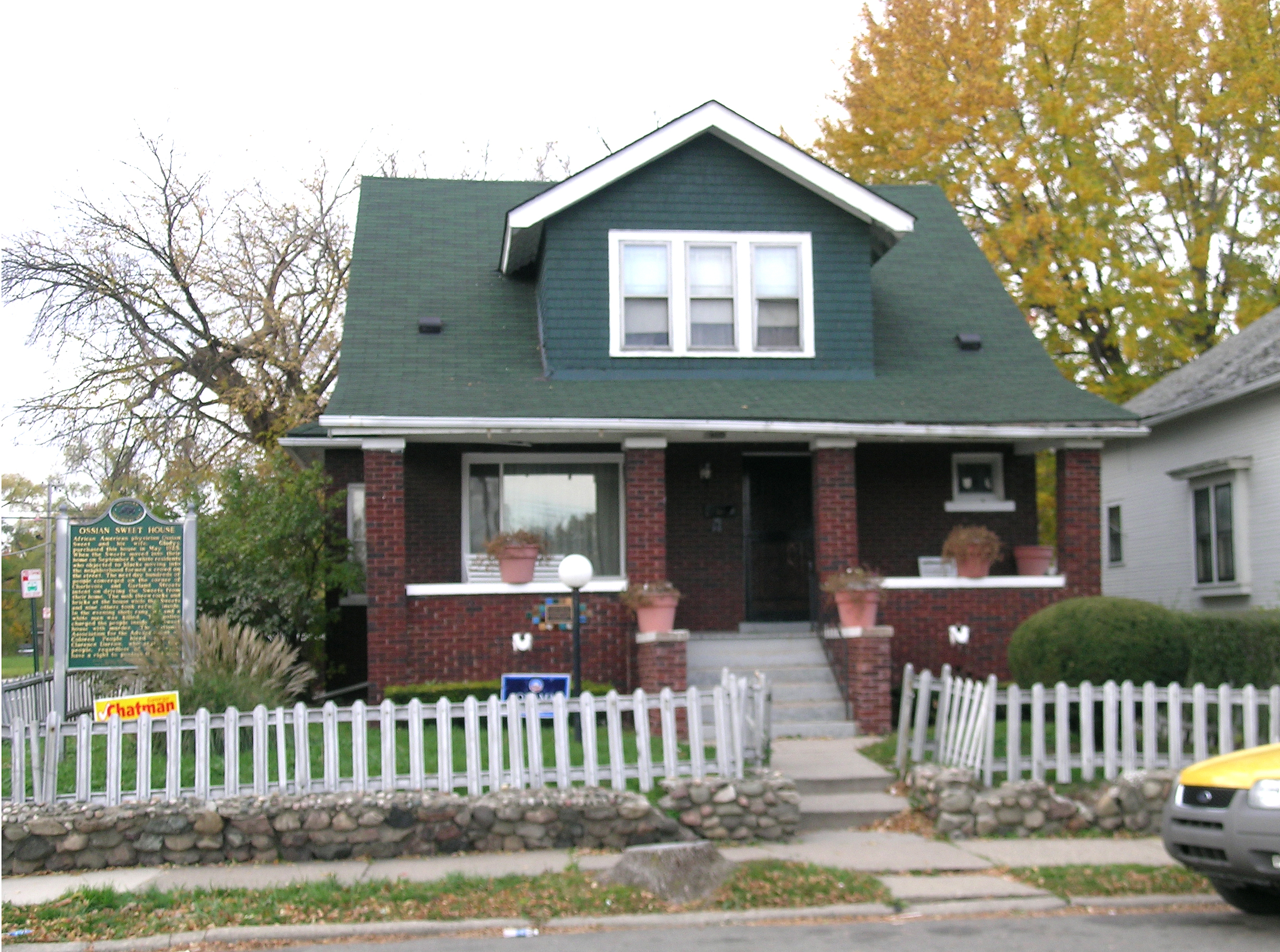

- Location within Michigan
- Interactive map
- Location: 2905 Garland Street; Detroit, Michigan
- Coordinates: 42°22′13″N 82°59′4″W
- Built: 1919
- Architect: Maurice Finkel
- Architectural style: American Craftsman bungalow
- NRHP reference No.: 85000696

Significant dates
- Added to NRHP: April 04, 1985
- Designated MSHS: November 21, 1975

The Ossian H. Sweet House is a privately owned house located at 2905 Garland Street in Detroit, Michigan. The house was designed by Maurice Herman Finkel, and in 1925 it was bought by its second owner, physician Ossian Sweet, an African American. Soon after he moved in, the house was the site of a confrontation when a white mob of about 1,000 gathered in protest of the Sweet family moving into the formerly all-white neighborhood. Rocks thrown by the mob broke windows, and someone in the house fired out, wounding one man in the mob and killing a bystander. Sweet and ten other persons from the house were arrested for murder.

Contacted by the NAACP, nationally known attorney Clarence Darrow joined their defense team. After a mistrial, in the second trial the first defendant was acquitted. The prosecution dropped charges against the remaining defendants. The case was considered important as part of the civil rights movement and establishing freedom of residence. The house was designated as a Michigan State Historic Site in 1975 and listed on the National Register of Historic Places in 1985.

== Ossian Sweet ==
Ossian Sweet was born in Florida and earned a medical degree from Howard University. He practiced medicine briefly in Detroit, then continued his medical studies in Vienna and Paris before returning to Detroit in 1924 to accept a position at Dunbar Hospital. He began saving money for a home, and by the spring of the next year had saved $3500. Sweet used the $3500 as a down payment on a $18,500 house located on Garland Street in east Detroit.

== The Ossian Sweet House ==
The house Sweet purchased is a 1½-story brick house, built in 1919, and is typical of many homes in working-class Detroit neighborhoods. It is a bungalow-style structure with a full basement, an open porch on the first floor, and an enclosed sun porch on the south side. The second story is covered with brown shingling, and atop the house is a simple gable roof with a central dormer. The house is enclosed by an unpainted silver aluminum fence.

The house is located on the corner of Garland and Charlevoix, in what was at the time an all-white neighborhood. Sweet chose a home in an all-white neighborhood because housing options in black neighborhoods were in general older and substandard, and he wanted better accommodations for his wife and daughter.

== Racial tension in the 1920s and the events in September 1925 ==
In the 1920s, white residents of Detroit tended to define themselves by the racial homogeneity of their neighborhoods. They also prided themselves in homeownership and interpreted the movement of blacks into their communities as a threat. Detroit's African American migrants were usually forced to locate to the east side where landlords took advantage of overcrowding and charged high rents. Barriers to black homeownership usually took the form of real estate agent's or homeowners refusal to sell homes to blacks, threats of violence to enforce segregated barriers in communities, and restrictive covenants that legally barred the movement of blacks into a neighborhood.

The Sweets purchased their home in a mostly white immigrant area from an interracial couple. Since the couple was interracial, the Sweets had lessened fears about a violent retaliation from the white neighbors. However, the white neighbors believed that the previous couple had been white due to their lighter complexion. When the neighbors learned that the house was sold to an African American couple, they organized "The Waterworks Park Improvement Association" to oppose their presence in the neighborhood. Like other neighborhood groups, they banned together to preserve racial homogeneity and intended to maintain "the present high standards of the neighborhood."

Aware of tensions in the area, The Sweets delayed their move in until September and on September 8, 1925, Dr. Ossian Sweet and his wife Gladys moved into the area. The white neighborhood group that was aware of Sweet's imminent arrival had vowed to keep blacks out of the neighborhood. Sweet knew of the neighbors' animosity. Telling his brother that he was "prepared to die like a man", he arranged for some friends and relatives to stay with him for a few days. Along with his personal peers, he brought guns and ammunition to protect himself against the looming confrontation.

The neighborhood was tense, and groups of people gathered outside Sweet's home. The Detroit Police, sensing a grave situation, posted officers at the scene day and night. The following day, September 9, Sweet and his friends went to work. When they returned, the crowd had grown into a mob, throwing rocks and bottles. A Detroit News reporter, Philip A. Adler, later testified that the mob consisted of "400 and 500" people, throwing stones that hit the house "like hail." This lasted until around 10pm, when shots rang out from the second-floor window, killing a man on a porch and wounding another in the crowd. The police arrested all the occupants of the house, charging each with murder.

== Aftermath ==
The NAACP promised to help the defense, and brought in Clarence Darrow as chief counsel. He was assisted by Arthur Garfield Hays and Walter M. Nelson. Frank Murphy was the presiding judge. The jury consisted of twelve white men. Despite this, Darrow built an impressive case arguing self-defense, and the case ended in a hung jury. The prosecution decided to try the defendants individually the second time, and started with Ossian's brother Henry, but he was acquitted. Believing it could not gain convictions, the prosecution dropped charges against Ossian Sweet and remaining defendants.

After the trials, Ossian Sweet rented the home on Garland to a white couple until 1930, when he moved back into the house. However, both his wife and two-year-old daughter Iva had died of tuberculosis in 1926. Sweet remarried twice, and divorced each time. In 1946, he sold the house, moving into the flat above a pharmacy he owned. In 1960, in failing health, Sweet took his own life.

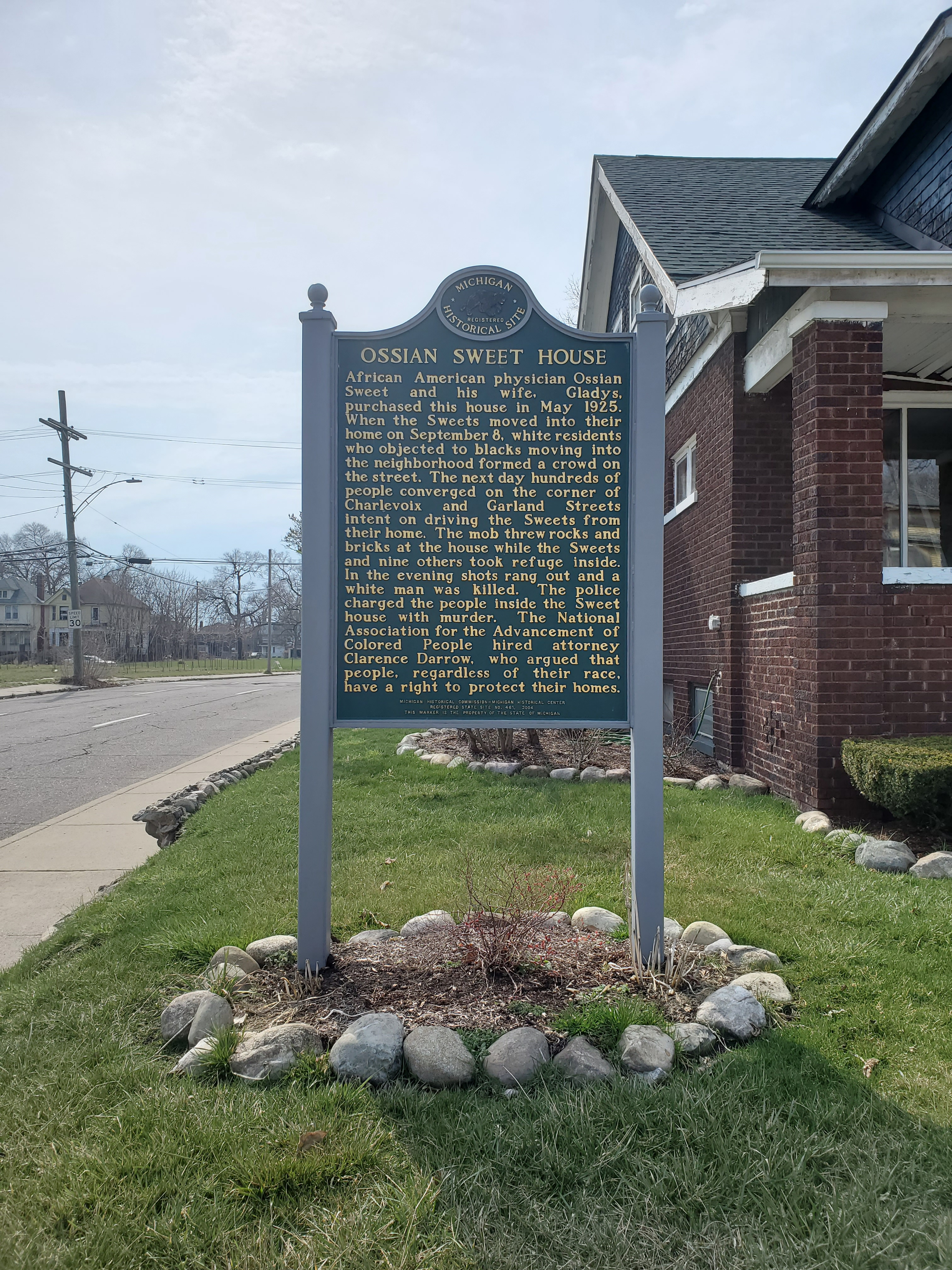
A State of Michigan historical marker that currently stands in front of the house at 2905 Garland

== Future for the Ossian Sweet House ==
The trial of Ossian Sweet and ten family members and friends for murder after defending their Detroit home captured media attention in the 1920s. The Ossian Sweet case exposed racial tensions in Detroit following the Great Migration and marked a legacy in the history of challenging segregation in the court system.

On August 13, 2018, Detroit city officials announced that they would grant $500,000 to purchase and rehabilitate the Sweet home and the two houses across the street.

The Ossian Sweet Historic area is the site of deadly 1925 racial incident after the black family moved into the all-white neighborhood on Detroit's east side. The plan of action in transforming the space is in the preliminary stages. Currently, the Baxter family privately owns the home, but officials intend on making arrangements with the homeowner to preserve living quarters as well as place museum installments on the first floor for public visitations.

Right now, there is a historic post on the lawn of the house that tours and visitors tend to frequent, but with the installation many more can learn about the importance of the case through scheduled visits. Mayor Mike Duggan said in the announcement of the grant: "As Detroit continues to move forward, we cannot forget where we’ve been. Preserving the Dr. Sweet home and expanding the historic district will give us a chance to reflect on the struggles many African-American families have faced and celebrate champions like Dr. Sweet and others, who stood up for what is right.”

== See also ==
- History of the African-Americans in Metro Detroit
