= Yankees Classics =

US television program

Yankees Classics is a program on the YES Network which features classic New York Yankees games.

Each Yankees Classics episode is hosted by Yankees radio announcer John Sterling, who discusses the game's impact on Yankees history at the beginning and end of the telecast.

== Network broadcast library ==
When it debuted in 2002 as one of the first series to air on YES, Yankees Classics consisted entirely of regular season games from the team's local broadcasts, via WPIX, MSG Network, and WNYW. In 2003, YES acquired rights to rebroadcast playoff games that aired nationally on Fox. In 2007, YES and Major League Baseball acquired rights to games that aired on ABC as part of MLB's then-TV deal with ESPN, including Bobby Murcer's five runs batted in during the game the night of Thurman Munson's funeral. Other games included in this transaction are Game 5 of the 1976 ALCS and Game 6 of the 1977 World Series. In 2008, YES and MLB gained the rights to NBC's telecasts of 1978 and 1999 World Series games.

== Graphics and announcers used ==
The logos of the original broadcasters originally were covered by the YES Network logo; eventually, the logos were then replaced by the Yankees logo. The announcers used were a combination of the Yankees radio announcers and national broadcasters used during the telecast, with the audio feed constantly changing during the game from one announcing team to the other, possibly to prevent advertisements or station promos to be heard, or to include Yankee broadcasters Sterling and Michael Kay giving calls of a Yankee home run, or of Sterling's signature victory closing: "Ballgame over! Yankees win! The-e-e-e Yankees win!" Regular season games since YES' launch in 2002 simply take the TV broadcast, with most out-of-date sponsor plugs removed.

== Typically scheduled air dates ==
A specific Yankees Classic often is shown on its anniversary or on a day when the current team is playing the same opponent. (For example, on October 2, or when the Yankees are scheduled to play the Boston Red Sox, the 1978 playoff game for the American League Eastern Division title, featuring the improbable home run by Bucky Dent, often is broadcast.) Other possibilities include honoring a Yankee on his birthday by showing a Yankees Classics in which he was the game's hero. (For example, on June 26, Derek Jeter's birthday, YES may broadcast Game 4 of the 2001 World Series, which Jeter won with an extra-inning home run; this was his "Mr. November" game.) Games featuring individual Yankee achievements, such as Ron Guidry's 18-strikeout game, no-hitters, and David Cone's 1999 perfect game often are shown, for example, to coincide with programs about Yankee pitchers.

As with other re-broadcast games, some innings are skipped due to time restrictions.

== Criticism ==
Yankees Classics has been criticized for showing recent games, including those from the current MLB season, when there are many games which have not been seen in decades. For example, although the memorable 1978 playoff game against Boston has frequently aired, YES has not shown any games from the 1978 ALCS. Also there have thus far been no shows featuring any of the games from the 1977 ALCS, 1981 ALDS or 1981 ALCS. Outside of Dave Righetti's July 4, 1983, no hit game, there have been no broadcasts of any Yankees games from the 1980s. It is not clear why this is but some have speculated that complete tapes of the games no longer exist or are technically unsuitable for broadcast.

It has also been observed that while episodes of the biographical program Yankeeography make reference to losing efforts in the careers of its subjects, the Yankee Classics series has yet to air anything but games won by the team. This meant that the game in which Derek Jeter surpassed Lou Gehrig's record for most hits as a Yankee, would never be aired as the Yankees lost the game to the Baltimore Orioles. However, this game was later aired on Yankees Classics, only edited until the point where Jeter got the hit.
