= Maurice Herman Finkel =

Maurice Herman Finkel (1888–1949) was an American architect and Yiddish theater actor, known for buildings designed in and near Detroit, Michigan, where he had his career. Born in Bessarabia, part of the Russian Empire, he immigrated to New York City as a child with his family. There he performed for a time in the Yiddish theater. He moved to Detroit, Michigan after getting his architecture degree in New York, and made his career at a time of great growth in the city. He designed more than 200 buildings, including grand movie palaces, apartments and houses, and commercial structures. Three of his buildings have been listed on the National Register of Historic Places.

== Biography ==
Finkel was born in Bessarabia, Russian Empire in 1888 to an Ashkenazi Jewish family. His first language was Yiddish. His family immigrated to the United States when he was a child, settling in New York City. He attended local public schools, where he learned English. Finkel also became involved with Yiddish theater, which was very active while he was growing up. He acted in several plays. At the same time he was busy with advanced studies, and received an architecture degree from the Cooper Union for the Advancement of Science and Art in Manhattan, New York in 1913.

Finkel moved to Detroit, Michigan, where he began his architecture career in 1915. The city was described as a boom town, growing rapidly along the auto industry. He designed more than 200 structures, from apartment buildings and houses, to help accommodate the increased population, to a great variety of commercial and entertainment buildings, including movie theaters. His works include what is now known as the Ossian H. Sweet House, built in 1919; the 1,700-seat Michigan Theater in Ann Arbor, Michigan, which opened in 1928; and the Michigan Theatre in Jackson, Michigan, which opened in 1930. Each of these buildings is listed on the National Register of Historic Places.

Finkel married and had a family. His son is George Finkel, a TV sports producer, and three-time Emmy winner.
