= George Finkel =

American television director and producer (1936–2019)

George Finkel (July 29, 1936 – April 17, 2019) was an American television sports producer and director. He was the son of architect Maurice Herman Finkel. He graduated from University of Michigan in 1958.

Finkel worked for NBC Sports from August 1971 to February 1990 and won three Emmys, for producing Super Bowl XIII, for 1982 World Series, and for producing gymnastics at the 1988 Olympics.

He also produced the highest-rated basketball game in television history: the 1979 NCAA men's championship game, featuring Magic Johnson's Michigan State defeating Larry Bird's Indiana State.
