= John Sterling (sportscaster) =

American sportscaster (1938–2026)

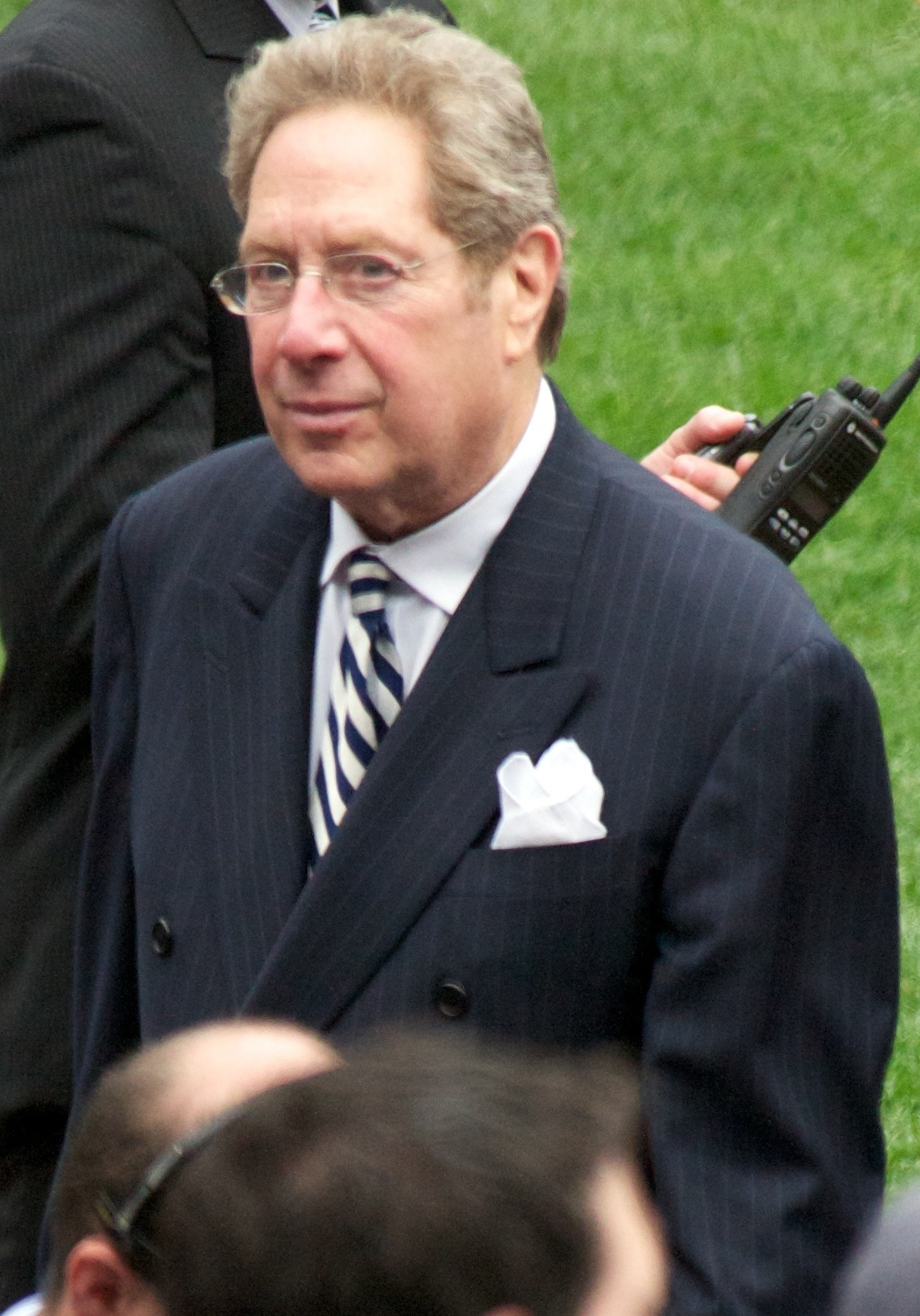
- Sterling in 2010
- Born: John Sloss; July 4, 1938; New York City, U.S.
- Died: May 4, 2026 (aged 87); Englewood, New Jersey, U.S.
- Occupation: Sportscaster
- Years active: 1960–2025
- Known for: 5,060 consecutive regular-season games called; Announced eight World Series, including five victories (1996, 1998, 1999, 2000, 2009); 12× Sports Emmy Award winner
- Sports commentary career
- Teams: Baltimore Bullets (1970–1971); New York/New Jersey Nets (1975–1981); New York Islanders (1975–1978); Atlanta Hawks (1981–1989); Atlanta Braves (1982–1987); New York Yankees (1989–2024)

John Sterling (né Sloss; July 4, 1938 – May 4, 2026) was an American sportscaster, best known as the radio play-by-play announcer of the New York Yankees of Major League Baseball (MLB) from 1989 to 2024. Sterling called 5,060 consecutive Yankees games from 1989 to 2019.

== Early life ==
Sterling was born John Sloss in New York City on July 4, 1938. He grew up on Manhattan's Upper East Side, the son of advertising executive Carl H. T. Sloss and Gladys (Hodrov) Sloss, and was Jewish. He briefly attended Moravian College, Boston University, and the Columbia University School of General Studies before leaving school to begin his career in radio at WLSV in Wellsville, New York, where he called football, baseball, and basketball games for Wellsville High School. It is also where he changed his surname to catchier 'Sterling'.

== Broadcasting career ==
=== Early professional career ===
Sterling began his broadcasting career in Baltimore, where he served as the play-by-play announcer for the then-Baltimore Bullets of the National Basketball Association (NBA) for the 1970–71 season. He also did play-by-play for Morgan State University football, a role that he held from 1971 to 1978.

Sterling came to New York broadcasting as a talk show host with WMCA in 1971. He later served as the radio voice for the World Hockey Association's New York Raiders, the World Football League's New York Stars, the National Hockey League's New York Islanders (where he was paired with Bob Lawrence), and the American Basketball Association/NBA's New York/New Jersey Nets (where he was paired mainly with Mike DeTomasso). Sterling also did a stretch with the Yankees as pre-game host on WMCA and WINS radio, as well as co-host on cable segments with Mel Allen.

From 1975 through 1980, Sterling announced Nets and Islanders games for WMCA, WVNJ, WOR-TV, and SportsChannel New York, continuing his WMCA talk program until 1978. After his initial stint in New York, Sterling spent nine years in Atlanta hosting a sports call-in show on WSB radio and covering Major League Baseball's Atlanta Braves (1982–1987) and NBA's Atlanta Hawks (1981–1989) for Turner Sports.

=== New York Yankees (1989–2024) ===
In 1989, Sterling returned to New York to broadcast games for the New York Yankees of MLB on WABC radio; he would be on the call for the next thirty-five seasons, moving to WCBS-AM in 2002 and WFAN in 2013. His announcing partners were Jay Johnstone (1989–1990), Joe Angel (1991), Michael Kay (1992–2001), Charley Steiner (2002–2004), and Suzyn Waldman (2005–2024).

Sterling called 5,060 consecutive games for the Yankees from 1989 until 2019, when he took four games off from July 4 until July 7. This included all 2,747 regular season and 158 postseason games played by Derek Jeter. On October 18, 2021, Sterling signed a new contract with WFAN for 2022 with the potential for a reduced schedule. On June 6, 2022, Sterling announced that he would start working on a reduced schedule in the second half of the MLB season, primarily taking time off from traveling to road games outside of the northeastern United States. He continued to do road trips to Fenway Park, Citi Field, and Oriole Park at Camden Yards.

On September 20, 2018, as part of a promotion called "Rivalry in the Booth", Sterling and Boston Red Sox radio broadcaster Joe Castiglione switched places in the fourth inning. From June 29–30, 2019, Sterling called the first MLB games played in Europe.

Sterling was also host of the YES Network's Yankeeography series from 2002 to 2013, which produced biographies of New York Yankees. Among several nominations, Sterling received two Emmy Awards for the series. He also hosted the introductions and recaps for Yankees Classics. In addition, Sterling had a nightly commentary feature on WCBS newscasts called "Sterling on Sports", in which he gave his take on a recent sporting event or sports news item. This commentary aired nightly during the 6:15 pm sports report.

Sterling and his former broadcasting partner Michael Kay commonly worked together representing the Yankees. They announced the annual Yankees' Old-Timers' Day. They presided at the "Key to the City" ceremonies following Yankee World Series victories in 1996, 1998, 1999, 2000, and 2009. The pair often served as masters of ceremonies on and off the field for major Yankee events, including the 2000 ticker-tape parade held in the Yankees' honor after their World Series win. Sterling emceed several Yankees pre-game ceremonies including the number retirements of Jorge Posada, Andy Pettitte, Bernie Williams, Joe Torre, and Derek Jeter; Mariano Rivera's number retirement in 2013 and Monument Park induction (2016); and the 20th anniversary of the Yankees' 1996 World Series victory in 2016. His long association with the Yankees earned him the nickname "Pa Pinstripe" from New York Daily News writer Bob Raissman.

Sterling announced his retirement on April 15, 2024, effective immediately, saying he was tired of traveling. The Yankees honored Sterling before their game on April 20. He did return to call two innings of the game against the Cleveland Guardians on August 20, in celebration of a team T-shirt giveaway intended the celebrate the 20th year Sterling and Waldman worked together in the radio booth, (which was planned before his abrupt retirement). Sterling called the fourth and fifth innings of the game. The following Thursday it was announced Sterling was discussing a potential postseason return, then a final retirement. On September 5, Sterling confirmed he would return to the booth for the final homestand on September 24–26 and the playoffs, including up to the 2024 World Series where he would broadcast for the last time. Sterling made his final broadcast on October 30, 2024, in Game 5 of the World Series when the Yankees lost to the Dodgers.

=== Other work ===
From 2013 through 2017 Sterling announced the Kitten Bowl on the Hallmark Channel.

On December 16, 2018, Sterling called the Brooklyn Nets–Atlanta Hawks game on the YES Network.

From April–December 2025, Sterling hosted an hour-long Saturday talk show on WABC from 4:00–5:00 pm.

== Announcing mannerisms ==
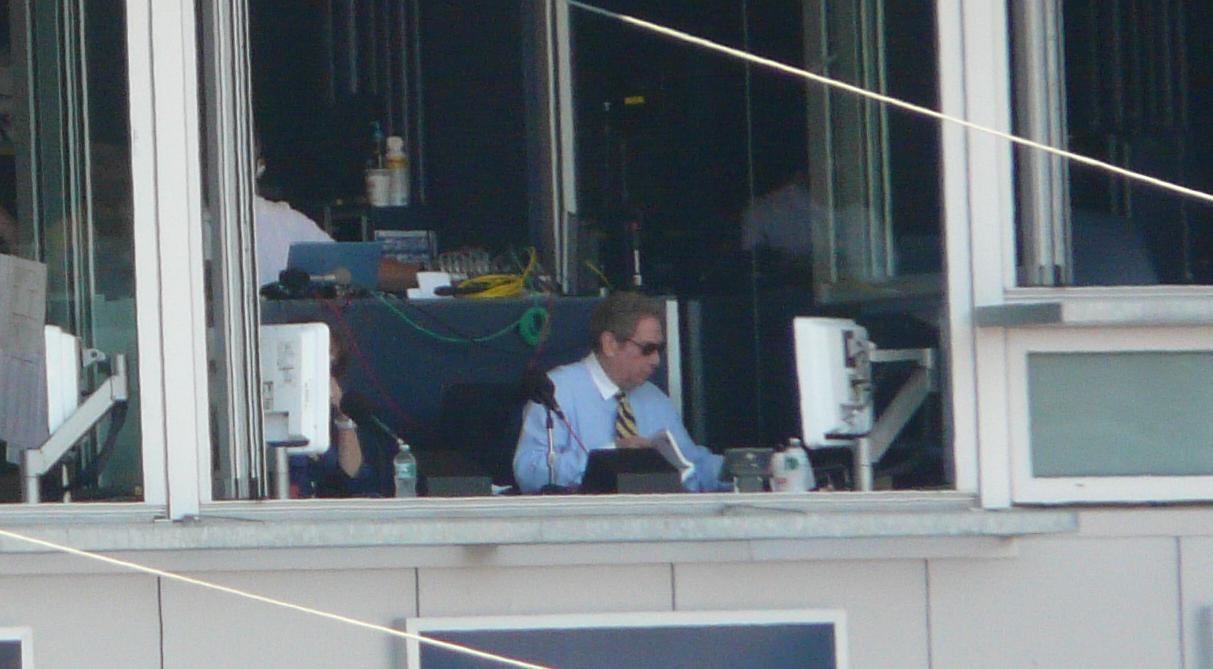
Sterling broadcasting a game

Sterling had several idiosyncrasies that marked his broadcasts as distinctive, very unusual, if also divisive. One of his signature radio remarks was his home run call "It is high, it is far, it is gone!" Sterling was known for devising a personalized home run catchphrase for every Yankee player.

Following the final out of a Yankees victory, Sterling called "Ballgame over! Yankees win! Theeeeeee Yankees win!" The length of the word "the" was held longer after dramatic victories, as well as after victories resulting in championships (which Sterling also punctuated by saying the name of whichever series is over). It has been played over the public address system at Yankee Stadium after every Yankees victory for the past several seasons, right before Frank Sinatra's cover of "Theme from New York, New York" is played. The phrase evolved from Sterling's call of Mel Hall's game-winning three-run homer in the ninth inning on May 27, 1991, to give the Yankees a dramatic Memorial Day win over the Boston Red Sox.

In all cases when Sterling emphasized the word "the", as was one of his signatures, he used not the long ē ("thee") but the schwa ə ("thuh").

In addition to a colorful vocal personality, Sterling distinguished himself for sometimes characterizing plays differently than they may appear and for his announcing errors, habits that sparked high feelings in fans and led to comparisons with announcers like Phil Rizzuto.

== Personal life and death ==
Sterling was a resident of Edgewater, New Jersey. He had previously resided in Teaneck, New Jersey. He was divorced in 2008 after 12 years of marriage to wife, Jennifer and is the father of four, including a set of triplets born in 2000. In January 2015, he was among hundreds of displaced residents after a fire destroyed the Avalon at Edgewater complex building.

In August 2020, Sterling was hospitalized for a blood infection.

On September 1, 2021, after calling a Yankees game remotely from Yankee Stadium, Sterling was stranded in his car about a mile from his home in Edgewater by flooding following Hurricane Ida. Spanish-language Yankees broadcaster Rickie Ricardo, also an Edgewater resident, was driving his Jeep Cherokee home and rescued Sterling.

On June 10, 2023, while broadcasting a game against the Boston Red Sox at Yankee Stadium, Sterling was hit in the head by a foul ball off the bat of Justin Turner. He continued broadcasting and returned to the booth the following night.

In February 2026, Sterling revealed he suffered a heart attack in January.

Sterling died from heart failure at a hospital in Englewood, New Jersey, on May 4, 2026, at the age of 87. The Yankees hosted a pregame tribute to Sterling at their home game against the Baltimore Orioles that night. Kay and Waldman laid flower bouquets on home plate, a moment of silence was observed, and a recording of Sterling’s signature “Yankees win, theeee Yankees win!” call was played after the final out of the game. In addition, the Bleacher Creatures included his name in their pregame roll call.

== Awards and honors ==
Sterling won 12 Sports Emmy Awards during his career, including two for Yankeeography.

Sterling and Waldman were honored in a few stadium giveaways in the 2020s. In 2022, the Yankees released a talking bobblehead of them. In 2023, the team released a "John & Suzyn" t-shirt, and in celebration of the duo's 20th anniversary together, the team featured them on another commemorative t-shirt that contained the phrase, "That's baseball Suzyn", one of Sterling's popular phrases.

In 2024 and 2025, Sterling was nominated as a finalist for the Ford C. Frick Award from the National Baseball Hall of Fame. In April 2025, he was given the Pride of the Yankees award at the team's annual Welcome Home dinner.
