= Yankeeography =

US television program

- Genre: Sport
- Written by: Jeff Scott
- Presented by: John Sterling
- Country of origin: United States
- Original language: English
- No. of seasons: 8
- No. of episodes: 56

Production
- Producer: MLB Productions
- Production company: MLB Productions

Original release
- Network: YES Network
- Release: March 1, 2002 – present

Yankeeography is a biography-style television program that chronicles the lives and careers of the players, coaches, and other notable personnel associated with the New York Yankees Major League Baseball team. The series is aired on the YES Network and was conceived and created by then YES Executive producer John J. Filippelli and is produced by MLB Productions in association with the YES Network The series is hosted by Yankees radio personality John Sterling. The series has earned five New York Sports Emmy Awards since its inception. In addition to airing on YES, MLB Productions has packaged many of the shows into DVD boxed sets.

After debuting as a weekly show with the 2002 launch of YES, Yankeeography only debuts new episodes periodically (as there are fewer prominent Yankees yet to be spotlighted). For instance, four episodes premiered in 2006: Tino Martinez, David Cone, the Yankees' 1996 World Series team, and Billy Martin. All Yankees with retired numbers have had shows completed with the exception of Bill Dickey. The show has been criticized for producing episodes on players who remain active while Hall of Famers from much earlier eras such as Jack Chesbro, Tony Lazzeri, Red Ruffing and Lefty Gomez were not profiled. Some profiles have been updated to reflect new developments.

== Selected players and coaches profiled ==
=== First airing in 2002 season ===
- Joe DiMaggio
- Lou Gehrig
- Ron Guidry
- Derek Jeter
- Mickey Mantle
- Don Mattingly
- Thurman Munson
- Paul O'Neill
- Mariano Rivera
- Babe Ruth
- Joe Torre
- Bernie Williams

=== First airing in 2003 ===
- Yogi Berra
- Catfish Hunter
- Roger Maris
- The History of the Yankees; a six-part, six-hour series commemorating the franchise's 100th anniversary:
  - "Moments and Mystique," featuring great moments in team history, including a discussion of the rivalry with the Boston Red Sox
  - 1903–1956, covering the team's early days, and the years of Ruth, Gehrig and DiMaggio, into the early Mantle years
  - 1957–1978, into the later years of Mantle, the down years between the 1965 collapse of the dynasty and the renewal of glory under new owner George Steinbrenner
  - 1979–2002, covering the Winfield and Mattingly years, and the rebuilding that led to the titles of the Jeter/Torre years
  - The Stadium, concerning the history of Yankee Stadium, including its non-baseball-related events
  - The Greatest Yankees Teams, featuring the 1927, 1961, 1977–1978 and 1998 World Championship squads

=== First airing in 2004 ===
- Whitey Ford
- Elston Howard
- Reggie Jackson
- Bobby Murcer
- Jorge Posada
- Phil Rizzuto
- Generations: The First Basemen
- Generations: The Second Basemen
- Generations: The Third Basemen
- Generations: The Right-Handed Pitchers
- Generations: The Left-Handed Pitchers

=== First airing in 2005 ===
- Goose Gossage
- Sparky Lyle
- Graig Nettles
- Lou Piniella
- Willie Randolph
- Casey Stengel
- The Hall-of-Famers; hosted by Reggie Jackson on location at the Baseball Hall of Fame, this is the one Yankeeography yet aired that was hosted by someone other than John Sterling.

=== First airing in 2006 ===
- David Cone
- Billy Martin
- Tino Martinez
- 1996

=== First airing in 2007 ===
- Hideki Matsui; this was set to premiere in June 2006, but was held back due to an on-field injury.
- Pitcher Perfect; dedicated to the 3 perfect games pitched by former Yankees Don Larsen, David Wells, and David Cone.
- Andy Pettitte
- Roger Clemens

=== First airing in 2008 ===
- 1998
- Alex Rodriguez
- Yankee Stadium

=== First airing in 2009 ===
- Dave Winfield
- Mike Mussina
- George Steinbrenner

=== First airing in 2010 ===
- 2009

=== First airing in 2012 ===
Gene Michael

=== First airing in 2013 ===
- David Wells

== Yankeeography episodes available on DVD ==
=== 100 Years of the New York Yankees (2003) ===
This two disc collection contains the six parts of The History of the Yankees, entitled: "1903-1956", "1957-1978", "1979-2002", "Moments and Mystique", "The Stadium", and "The Greatest Yankees Teams"

=== Yankeeography, Vol. 1 (2004) ===
Volume 1 contains six episodes on Babe Ruth, Thurman Munson, Ron Guidry, Don Mattingly, Derek Jeter, and Joe Torre. A third disc includes various extras such as unforgettable moments and archived footage.

=== Yankeeography, Vol. 2 (2004) ===
Volume 2 contains six episodes on Lou Gehrig, Phil Rizzuto, Mickey Mantle, Elston Howard, Paul O'Neill, and Mariano Rivera. A third disc includes various extras such as unforgettable moments and archived footage.

=== Yankeeography, Vol. 3 (2005) ===
Volume 3 contains six episodes on Joe DiMaggio, Catfish Hunter, Bobby Murcer, Reggie Jackson, Goose Gossage, and Jorge Posada. A third disc includes various extras such as unforgettable moments and archived footage.

=== Yankeeography, Vol. 4 (2005) ===
Volume 4 contains six episodes on Yogi Berra, Whitey Ford, Roger Maris, Lou Piniella, Willie Randolph, and Bernie Williams. A third disc includes various extras such as unforgettable moments and archived footage.

=== Yankeeography "Megaset" DVD Collection (2007) ===
The Megaset is a 12 DVD set with 34 episodes of Yankeeography, including 10 previously unreleased episodes (Billy Martin, Casey Stengel, Sparky Lyle, Graig Nettles, David Cone, Tino Martinez, Roger Clemens, The Hall of Famers, The Left Handers, The Right Handers)

Set 1 contains 11 episodes: Babe Ruth, Lou Gehrig, Joe DiMaggio, Phil Rizzuto, Yogi Berra, Mickey Mantle, Whitey Ford, Billy Martin, Casey Stengel, Elston Howard, and Roger Maris.

Set 2 contains 12 episodes: Thurman Munson, Bobby Murcer, Sparky Lyle, Graig Nettles, Lou Piniella, Catfish Hunter, Ron Guidry, Willie Randolph, Reggie Jackson, Goose Gossage, Don Mattingly, and Bernie Williams.

Set 3 contains 11 episodes: Paul O'Neill, David Cone, Derek Jeter, Mariano Rivera, Jorge Posada, Joe Torre, Tino Martinez, Roger Clemens, The Hall of Famers, The Left Handers, and The Right Handers.

Set 4 contains extra features such as archived footage and interviews about all players included on previous discs.

=== Yankeeography: The Captains Collection (2009) ===
Released in August 2009, this is a 2-DVD collection which contains episodes about prominent Yankee captains: Lou Gehrig, Thurman Munson, Graig Nettles, Ron Guidry, Willie Randolph, Don Mattingly, and Derek Jeter. The set also contains bonus material and episode Moments & Mystique from the 100 Years of the New York Yankees collection.

=== Yankeeography: The Core Four Collection (2010) ===
Released in November 2010, this 2-DVD collections contains episodes about the core players of the 1995-2010 era: Derek Jeter, Mariano Rivera, Jorge Posada, and Andy Pettitte, as well as extras.

=== Yankeeography "Megaset" DVD Collection (2011) ===
Released in November 2011, 16 DVD set, 32-page Collectible Book.

- Disc 1: Yankee Stadium
- Disc 2: Babe Ruth, Lou Gehrig, Joe DiMaggio, Phil Rizzuto.
- Disc 3: Yogi Berra, Billy Martin, Whitey Ford, Mickey Mantle.
- Disc 4: Casey Stengel, Elston Howard, Roger Maris.
- Disc 5: Bonus: Babe Ruth, Lou Gehrig, Joe DiMaggio, Phil Rizzuto, Yogi Berra, Billy Martin, Whitey Ford, Mickey Mantle, Casey Stengel, Elston Howard, Roger Maris.
- Disc 6: Bobby Murcer, Thurman Munson, Sparky Lyle, Graig Nettles.
- Disc 7: Lou Piniella, Catfish Hunter, Ron Guidry, Willie Randolph.
- Disc 8: Reggie Jackson, Goose Gossage, Dave Winfield, Don Mattingly.
- Disc 9: Bonus: Bobby Murcer, Thurman Munson, Sparky Lyle, Graig Nettles, Lou Piniella, Catfish Hunter, Ron Guidry, Willie Randolph, Reggie Jackson, Goose Gossage, Dave Winfield, Don Mattingly.
- Disc 10: Bernie Williams, Paul O'Neill, Andy Pettitte, Mariano Rivera.
- Disc 11: Derek Jeter, David Cone, Jorge Posada, Tino Martinez.
- Disc 12: Bonus: Bernie Williams, Paul O'Neill, Andy Pettitte, Mariano Rivera, Derek Jeter, David Cone, Jorge Posada, Tino Martinez.
- Disc 13: Joe Torre, Roger Clemens, Mike Mussina, Hideki Matsui.
- Disc 14: Alex Rodriguez, George Steinbrenner. Bonus:Joe Torre, Roger Clemens, Mike Mussina, Hideki Matsui, Alex Rodriguez, George Steinbrenner.
- Disc 15: 1996 Season In Review, 1998 Season In Review.
- Disc 16: Tales Of Triumph: 1996 World Series, 1998 World Series, 2001 World Series Game 4 & 5, 1978 Playoff: Bucky Dent, No-Hitters & Perfect Games, 2003 ALCS:Aaron Boone Homer.
