= YES Network =

American regional sports network

- Primary logo with navy blue background, currently used for New York Yankees broadcasts. A variation with a black background is used for Brooklyn Nets broadcasts.
- Type: Regional sports network
- Country: United States
- Broadcast area: New York; North and Central Jersey; Connecticut; Northeastern Pennsylvania; Nationwide (via satellite and select cable providers)
- Headquarters: Stamford, Connecticut

Programming
- Language: English
- Picture format: 720p (HDTV) (downscaled to letterboxed 480i for the SDTV feed)

Ownership
- Owner: Yankee Global Enterprises (46%); Amazon (15%); The Blackstone Group (13%); RedBird Capital Partners (13%); Mubadala Investment Company (13%)
- Sister channels: MGM+; ScreenPix

History
- Launched: March 19, 2002; 24 years ago

Links
- Website: yesnetwork.com

Availability (Live games are only available in-market, alternate programming is shown on national feed)

Terrestrial
- DirecTV: 631; 631-1 (YES2)
- Charter Spectrum: 53 (54 St Lawrence County, NY) or 321; 371 (YES2)
- Optimum: 70 or 201; 60 or 202 (YES2)
- Verizon Fios: 576; 598 (YES2)

Streaming media
- The Gotham Sports App: gothamsports.com (Requires a Gotham Sports account or existing YES Network account, and a login from participating providers or a subscription to stream content)
- DirecTV Stream: Internet Protocol Television
- FuboTV: Internet Protocol Television

The Yankees Entertainment and Sports Network (YES) is an American pay television regional sports network owned by Yankee Global Enterprises (the largest shareholder with 46%), Amazon (which owns 15%), and the Blackstone Group, RedBird Capital and Mubadala Investment Company, which each own 13% as of April 21, 2026. Primarily serving New York City, New York, and the surrounding metropolitan area, it broadcasts a variety of sports events, as well as magazine, documentary and discussion programs; however, its main emphasis is focused on games and team-related programs involving the New York Yankees of Major League Baseball (owned by minority partner Yankee Global), and the NBA's Brooklyn Nets.

YES Network's offices are based at the MetLife Building in Midtown Manhattan. YES programs, including Yankees and Nets pre- and post-game shows, are produced in studios that are located in Stamford, Connecticut. The channel is available on cable and IPTV providers in New York, New Jersey, Connecticut and parts of Pennsylvania; it is available nationally on some cable systems (as part of a designated sports tier), via satellite on DirecTV, and regionally on Frontier, AT&T U-verse, Verizon Fios, Cox Communications, and FuboTV.

== History ==
=== Beginnings ===
YES is the product of a holding company founded in 1999 called YankeeNets, created out of a merger of the business operations of the Yankees and the New Jersey Nets. One of the reasons behind the operational merger was to allow both teams to gain better leverage over their own broadcast rights; each party believed that it would obtain better individual deals, if they negotiated the rights collectively.

Two years earlier in 1997, Cablevision – which at the time had owned the Nets' television broadcaster, SportsChannel New York (later known as Fox Sports Net New York, and now known as MSG Sportsnet) – became the sole owner to the television rights of all seven Major League Baseball, NBA and NHL teams in the New York City market when it acquired the competing MSG Network (previously owned by Viacom through its 1994 purchase of the network's former parent Paramount Communications), which had held the broadcast rights to the Yankees since 1989. This led to monopoly-like tactics, including the shift of some games to the cable-exclusive MSG Metro Channels, which had very limited distribution as Cablevision, Comcast and Time Warner Cable routinely fought over carriage agreements. Cablevision attempted to buy the Yankees outright, but could not agree to acceptable terms with George Steinbrenner and his partners.

To exit its MSG/Cablevision deal, the Yankees would have to give them the right to match any new right agreement and show a judge that a third party was willing to purchase their rights and launch a channel. Thus, new YankeeNets CEO Harvey Schiller hired IMG to provide a valuation for the prospective YankeeNets sport channel. IMG came back with an offer to partner on the channel with a guaranteed rights fees of $838 million. In 2000, YankeeNets and IMG proposed forming a sports channel valued as high as $2.4 billion. Cablevision sued considering its valuing as "outlandish" to block the channel. In April 2001, the suit was settled such that in June 2001, YankeeNets paid MSG to take the Yankees' TV rights in-house. IMG had been replaced by other investors, Goldman, Sachs & Company, the Quadrangle Group, Leo Hindery Jr., chief executive of the network, and Amos Hostetter Jr., a billionaire cable veteran, who in total had a 40% share of the channel.

=== Launch of a new network ===
Michael Kay's introduction on YES' first game broadcast on March 19, 2002

The YES Network launched at noon on March 19, 2002, with a half-hour introductory show. The first game broadcast on YES was an exhibition game between the New York Yankees and the Cincinnati Reds at 7 PM on the same day. At its launch, YES was available on DirecTV and to subscribers of all major New York area cable providers except Cablevision which would refuse to add the network for the 2002 season (see below). The first regular season game broadcast on YES was played on April 1 against the Baltimore Orioles.

In late 2003, the Yankees and Nets decided to part ways, with the Nets being sold to a group led by real estate developer Bruce Ratner. The sale did not include the Nets' ownership stake in YES (NJ Holdings), which remained with the pre-merger owners of the team. As part of the sale, the Nets signed a long-term deal to keep the team's game telecasts on YES. In 2004, YankeeNets was renamed Yankee Global Enterprises, which owns the Yankees and the minority share in YES as separate companies. Therefore, the Yankees technically do not own YES. The Yankees, however, receive a rights fee from YES that is somewhat higher than MSG previously paid.

=== Fox ownership, FSN affiliation ===
In 2007, Goldman Sachs' and former Nets owner Ray Chambers' share in the network was put up for sale. In November 2012, News Corporation agreed to terms on acquiring a 49% stake in YES. As a consequence, each of the network's previous owners had their ownership stakes reduced. As a result of the sale to Fox, the Yankees agreed to keep their games on the network through 2041, which would be the network's 40th year of existence. News Corporation's interest in YES was transferred to 21st Century Fox (owned by Rupert Murdoch, who also remained the owner of News Corporation), when the former company spun off its U.S. entertainment holdings into a separate company in July 2013.

In September 2013, rights to Fox Sports Networks' national programming (previously held by MSG Plus, which had previously operated as FSN New York) were transferred to YES. On January 25, 2014, 21st Century Fox became the network's majority owner by purchasing an additional 31% share of YES Network from someone, increasing the company's ownership interest from 49% to 80%.

In 2014, the YES Network announced an average 223,000 households in Yankees game broadcasts. On May 14, 2017, YES Network aired Derek Jeter's number retirement ceremony. It got an average 724,000 viewers and a 5.79 rating in the New York City area, the highest non-game program for the network.

=== Disney/Fox acquisition, reacquisition by the Yankees ===
At the end of 2017, the Walt Disney Company (which owned ABC owned-and operated station WABC-TV) announced plans to acquire 21st Century Fox following the divestiture of certain assets. While it originally included the Fox Sports Networks chain and YES Network, the Department of Justice ordered that they be sold on antitrust grounds due to Disney's ownership of ESPN.

Bloomberg News reported that the sale of stakes in YES to Fox contained a clause giving the Yankees rights to buy them back in the event of a change in ownership. In 2018, the Yankees invoked the right of first refusal to acquire YES in the event that the sale of Fox Sports Networks to was successful, formally bidding 9 days later in a joint deal with Blackstone Group to get the 80% stake back. The Yankees also appointed the Ontario Teachers' Pension Plan, RedBird Capital Partners, and Mubadala Investment Company to assist with their bid for the network. Amazon, who was expected to bid for other FSN networks, instead bid for the 80% stake that Yankees want back, desiring to provide streaming services for the network.

In 2019, Fox News reported that the Yankees had reached a deal to re-purchase Fox's share in the network for $3.5 billion, with Sinclair (who ended up being the final suitor for Fox Sports Networks, and is also collaborating with the Chicago Cubs on a new regional network), Amazon, and the Blackstone Group holding minority shares. Mubadala Development Company, a United Arab Emirates’ sovereign wealth fund, and RedBird Capital Partners were reported as minority investors. The deal closed in August 2019.

In April 2020 during the early onset of the COVID-19 pandemic in New York City, WCBS-TV briefly broadcast its local newscasts from the YES Network studio set due to the unavailability of the CBS Broadcast Center.

== Programming ==
=== Original programming ===
In addition to live coverage of Yankees and Nets games, their respective pre-game and post-game shows and (as circumstances warrant) live press conferences, YES has produced various original programs, some of which have won local New York Emmy Awards. Other original programming featured on YES includes:

- Boston vs. New York Poker Challenge – a poker tournament matching Yankee fans against Boston Red Sox fans. Airing for two seasons, it was a co-production of YES and Boston-based regional sports channel New England Sports Network (NESN).
- CenterStage – a weekly program hosted by Yankees play-by-play announcer Michael Kay, featuring in-depth interviews with various celebrities.
- The Michael Kay Show – a video simulcast of the radio show from ESPN Radio affiliate WEPN-FM (98.7 FM), featuring Michael Kay, Don La Greca, and Peter Rosenberg.
- The Feed – Athletes share the stories behind their social media posts. The Feed won a New York Emmy Award for best Sports Interview/Discussion show in 2020.
- Forbes SportsMoney – a financial magazine program produced as a joint venture between YES and Forbes, focusing on the financial aspects of the sports industry.
- Homegrown: The Path to Pinstripes – a reality show that showcases the development of future Yankees players on their Class-AAA team, the Scranton/Wilkes-Barre RailRiders. As of 2019 the series has expanded with the addition of a spinoff, Homegrown: The Bridge to Brooklyn, a look into the lives of the players of the Nets' NBA G League team the Long Island Nets.
- The Mike Francesa Show – a video simulcast of the popular WFAN (660 AM) radio show Mike's On with host Mike Francesa (2008–2014). YES also simulcasted Francesa's nationally syndicated radio show The NFL Now under the title Football Sunday with Mike Francesa.
- Nets Magazine – a weekly program featuring news, analysis and feature segments focusing on the Brooklyn Nets.
- Yankees Classics – rebroadcasts of marquee New York Yankees games from previous years.
- Yankees Magazine – a weekly program featuring news, analysis and feature segments focusing on the Yankees.
- Yankeeography – a Biography-style program focusing on notable current and former Yankees personalities.
- Yankees on Deck (formerly Kids on Deck) – a children's program in which younger Yankee fans are given an inside look at what it is like to be a member of the Yankee organization.
- Yankees-Steiner: Memories of the Game – a reality series based around Yankee-related, and other baseball and sports memorabilia; co-produced by Yankees-Steiner Collectibles, a joint venture of the Yankees and Steiner Sports Marketing and Memorabilia.
- YES' Ultimate Road Trip (2005–2007) – a reality show that combined elements of The Real World and Road Rules, following a group of Yankee fans following the team around the country throughout an entire 162-game season.
- Yogi and a Movie – A showcase of sports movies featuring wraparound commentary segments hosted by Yankee Hall of Fame catcher Yogi Berra.

== Minor league baseball and college sports ==
Since the network's debut, YES has aired select telecasts of the Yankees' minor league farm teams, primarily the Class-A (short season) Staten Island Yankees of the New York–Penn League. Those games are produced by YES, utilizing the same graphics and announcers as seen during game telecasts of the major league Yankees.

From 2002 to 2006, YES also broadcast games from the Yankees' former Class-AAA team, the Columbus Clippers of the International League. Those games were produced locally in Columbus, Ohio. After the 2006 season, the Yankees ended their affiliation with the Clippers, and became affiliated with the Scranton/Wilkes-Barre RailRiders (formerly the Yankees and Red Barons). Until 2024, YES had only televised one RailRiders game, Masahiro Tanaka's minor league rehab start, the team also has local coverage within its Scranton/Wilkes-Barre market. However, since 2024, YES airs a limited amount of RailRiders games.

Currently YES Network airs college athletic events from the Northeast Conference. In 2024, YES also acquired rights to St. Bonaventure University men's and women's basketball, airing nine games split between the two squads on YES during the 2024–25 season. Previously, the network has also broadcast various college sports events including football and basketball games from the Ivy League, basketball games from the Big 12 Conference (through ESPN Plus) and rebroadcasts of Notre Dame Fighting Irish football games. It also carried the coaches' shows of Notre Dame and the Penn State Nittany Lions. In 2011, YES aired live broadcasts of college basketball games involving the Fordham University. YES also aired college football and basketball games from the ACC on Regional Sports Networks produced by Raycom Sports.

=== Relationships with New York Giants and Manchester United ===
In 2000, YankeeNets entered into a marketing agreement with the New York Giants; this included awarding YES the exclusive rights to the NFL franchise's magazine programs (including Giants Online and Giants on Deck, which continued to air on the network after the YankeeNets breakup). The Giants' relationship with YES Network ended in 2007, at which time its team-related programming moved to Fox owned-and-operated station WNYW (channel 5) and MyNetworkTV owned-and-operated station WWOR-TV (channel 9), a duopoly owned by Fox Television Stations (whose sister company, the Fox network, owns broadcast rights to most games from the Giants home conference, the National Football Conference).

YankeeNets also maintained a similar relationship with English football club Manchester United. YES broadcast tape-delayed and classic United games produced by the team-owned Manchester United TV in the network's earlier days.

=== Other sports programming ===
==== Production of Yankees games on other networks ====
The YES Network also produces Yankees game broadcasts shown on Amazon Prime Video using the same on-air talent seen on the cable network. From 2002 to 2004, WCBS-TV carried the Yankees broadcasts, with WWOR taking over those rights later. WLNY-TV held the local broadcast television rights to the Nets but no longer does. The Yankees package was also simulcast on other television stations in the team's designated market region.

YES also offers a Spanish-language feed of all of its Yankees game telecasts through the second audio program; this feed can also be heard on New York radio station WADO (AM), which current holds the contract to carry the Yankees' Spanish-language broadcasts.

==== Basketball ====
The network attempted to secure television rights to the New Jersey Devils, formerly owned by an affiliate of YankeeNets; after the team was sold to a different ownership group, the Devils opted to renew their contract with MSG Network and FSN New York in 2005, under a long-term agreement.

YES broadcasts NBA TV's daily news and fantasy basketball shows (usually in the form of rebroadcasts, but occasionally showing live telecasts in the early morning drive time hours) and The Marv Albert Show. For a couple of years during the early 2000s, YES and NBA TV also both aired reruns of the basketball-centered drama series The White Shadow. The network also previously aired This Week in Baseball during the week throughout the Major League Baseball regular season, following each episode's original Saturday broadcast on Fox. The network had previously carried Major League Baseball: An Inside Look during the week throughout the league's regular season.

YES acquired the local broadcast rights to the WNBA's New York Liberty in 2019 after the team was sold by the Madison Square Garden Company to Brooklyn Nets minority owner Joseph Tsai. In 2024 Liberty rights moved to WWOR and WNYW.

==== Soccer ====
As part of a multi-year agreement with MP & Silva, YES aired tape delayed broadcasts of Premier League, FA Cup and UEFA Champions League matches involving Arsenal F.C. In addition to airing Arsenal matches, the network aired select archived match telecasts, as well as the team's magazine shows, Arsenal World and Arsenal 360. This agreement ended at the start of the 2012–13 Premier League season. Arsenal would get picked up by ONE World Sports while YES would gain partnership with Manchester City FC.

In 2014, YES announced it had acquired local broadcast rights to New York City FC of Major League Soccer, a subsidiary of Manchester City FC. Yankee Global Enterprises owns a 20% minority stake in the club, which is majority-owned by City Football Group. This continued until 2023, when all regional MLS broadcasts were abolished as part of the league's agreement with Apple Inc.

In August 2022, it was announced that the YES Network would start airing AC Milan soccer matches in Serie A, Coppa Italia and The UEFA Champions League as a result of RedBird Capital Partners along with Yankee Global Enterprises acquiring the club on August 30, 2022.

==== Cricket ====
In June 2024, Willow announced that it had sublicensed MI New York Major League Cricket matches to YES Network for the 2024 season.

==== Business of sports ====
In March 2025 sports business publication Sportico announced a monthly series on YES Network, Sportico Sports Business presented by Genius Sports, hosted by Bob Lorenz and featuring appearances by Sportico writers and analysts, and interviews with sports figures.

== On-air staff ==
=== Current on-air staff ===
- Dellin Betances - Yankees studio analyst
- Vince Carter – Brooklyn Nets game analyst
- David Cone – lead Yankees game analyst
- Jack Curry – Yankees studio analyst/fill-in clubhouse reporter
- Chris Carrino – alternate play-by-play broadcaster for Nets
- Ian Eagle – lead play-by-play broadcaster for Nets games
- Noah Eagle - alternate play-by-play broadcaster for Nets games
- Todd Frazier - Yankees studio analyst
- Joe Girardi – Yankees game/studio analyst
- Richard Jefferson — Nets game analyst
- Michael Kay – lead play-by-play broadcaster for Yankees games; host of CenterStage; host of "The Michael Kay Show" which was formerly simulcast on YES
- Sarah Kustok – Brooklyn Nets primary game analyst
- Bob Lorenz – lead studio host/fill-in play-by-play
- Meredith Marakovits – Yankees sideline and clubhouse reporter
- Nancy Newman – studio host and host of Yankees Magazine
- Paul O'Neill – lead Yankees game analyst
- Adam Ottavino - Yankees studio analyst
- Ryan Ruocco – host of This Week in Football; alternate play-by-play voice for both the Yankees and the Brooklyn Nets; back-up Yankees studio host/sideline and clubhouse reporter.
- Justin Shackil - lead play-by-play for some Yankees games
- Chris Shearn – producer/on-air wrap-around host of The Michael Kay Show; host of Yankees Batting Practice Today; sideline reporter for college game broadcasts; Liberty play-by-play

Since the network's launch in 2002, longtime Yankee Stadium public address announcer Bob Sheppard has served as a continuity announcer for YES' network identifications and programming schedules. Recordings of Sheppard are still used occasionally even though Sheppard died in 2010. Ian Eagle also sometimes provides continuity for on-air promotions during the Nets season, beginning in 2019, he was joined by Joe Tolleson, who until 2022 provided network continuity during NYCFC's season.

=== Former on-air staff ===
- Marv Albert – lead play-by-play broadcaster for Nets games (2005–2011; previously worked at NBC Sports, TBS, TNT & CBS Sports. Retired)
- Greg Anthony – Brooklyn Nets game analyst. Now at NBC Sports, TBS, TNT, CBS Sports & NBA TV
- Michelle Beadle – Nets sideline reporter, correspondent, Yankees on Deck, host, YES' Ultimate Road Trip (2005–2009; now a part of the San Antonio Spurs broadcast team
- Keith Byars – co-host of This Week in Football
- Tim Capstraw – Nets game analyst; now analyst for Nets games on radio and was an analyst for some Nets games on YES in 2023–24 and 2024–25 seasons, primarily preseason contests
- John Flaherty – Yankees studio/game analyst
- Mike Francesa – former co-presenter of Mike and the Mad Dog (2002–2008), former presenter of The Mike Francesa Show
- Mike Fratello – Nets studio analyst
- Fred Hickman – studio host (2002–2004; former sports director at Fox affiliate WVUE-DT in New Orleans; died November 9, 2022)
- Mark Jackson – Nets game analyst (2005–2008; now at ESPN)
- Kimberly Jones – Yankees sideline/clubhouse reporter (2005–2012; was at NFL Network)
- Ian Joy – NYCFC game analyst
- David Justice – Yankees studio analyst; host of Yankees on Deck (2005–2007)
- Jim Kaat – Yankees game analyst (2002–2006)
- Don La Greca - former co-host of "The Michael Kay Show" simulcast on YES
- Al Leiter – Yankees game analyst (2006–2018; left the booth to focus on his family, including highly rated pitching prospect son, Jack)
- Donny Marshall – Nets game analyst
- Tino Martinez – Yankees game analyst (2010; served as hitting coach for the Miami Marlins for part of the 2013 season)
- Bobby Murcer – Yankees game analyst/studio analyst (2002–2008; died on July 12, 2008)
- Jeff Nelson — fill-in Yankees game analyst
- Lou Piniella – Yankees game analyst
- Peter Rosenberg - former co-host of "The Michael Kay Show" simulcast on YES
- Jen Royle – Yankees sideline/clubhouse reporter (2003–2006; now a private chef)
- Chris Russo – former co-presenter of Mike and the Mad Dog (2002–2008)
- Charley Steiner – occasional host of Yankees-related programs (2002–2004; now a radio play-by-play broadcaster for the Los Angeles Dodgers)
- Buck Showalter – Yankees studio analyst
- Ken Singleton – Yankees game analyst/alternate play-by-play
- John Sterling – host of Yankeeography and Yankees Classics
- Joe Tolleson – lead play-by-play broadcaster for NYCFC matches
- Kelly Tripucka – Nets game analyst (2003–2005; now a New York Knicks studio analyst on MSG Network)
- Suzyn Waldman – Yankees clubhouse reporter (2002–2004; now the game analyst for WFAN-AM/FM radio)

== Related services ==
=== YES2 ===
YES2 was a gametime-only overflow feed of YES Network, which broadcast select Nets games on rare occasions when the Nets and Yankees are scheduled to play at the same time. The feed was carried in both standard and high definition on most cable providers in the New York metropolitan area and nationwide on DirecTV. Nets games conflicting with the Yankees' schedule are now broadcast on an over-the-air Fox or MyNetworkTV local affiliate. The channel was discontinued in May 2026, although it had not been used for live programming for roughly 5 years at that point.

=== YES Network HD ===

YES Network HD is a 1080i high definition simulcast feed of the network, which is carried on select cable providers (including Xfinity, Astound Broadband, DirecTV, Optimum, Spectrum and Verizon FiOS). When it launched in mid-July 2004, YES HD initially only televised all Yankees home games, as well as away games involving the New York Mets and Boston Red Sox, in high definition. In 2005, YES began televising all Yankees games played east of the Mississippi River in high definition, with the network's HD telecasts expanding to encompass virtually all of the Yankees and Nets games in 2006. In addition to game telecasts, the network now also broadcasts all of its studio shows in HD. All YES-produced Yankees and Nets game telecasts aired on WWOR-TV began broadcasting in HD in September 2006.

In April 2007, YES converted the aspect ratio of its primary standard definition feed from full-screen to a letterboxed 4:3 format, which is a downconversion from the 16:9 high definition feed. The network's use of the AFD #10 broadcast flag to transmit its HD feed in this manner for broadcast in SD predates its use by other national cable networks such as Fox News Channel, ESPN and CNN.

YES Network borrowed time on Cablevision's "iO TV 1300" service and on DirecTV to carry the first baseball game ever transmitted in 3D on July 10 and 11, 2010, when the Yankees faced the Seattle Mariners; the 3D telecast of the game was also distributed to other cable providers.

=== National feed ===
YES Network maintains a national feed available to select cable providers outside of the New York City market – including Spectrum (as well as areas once served by Bright House Networks (on its systems in Tampa and Orlando), Verizon FiOS (in certain markets). The feed does not include the network's live game telecasts (with alternate programming airing in their place), however it does carry the pre-game and post-game shows that bookend Yankees and Nets games aired by YES within the market. This feed differs from the satellite feed of the network available on DirecTV, in which Yankees and/or Nets games can be viewed outside of the teams' markets through a subscription to MLB Extra Innings and/or NBA League Pass and the rest of the YES schedule can be viewed through a subscription to the DirecTV Sports Pack. The YES national feed was launched on July 31, 2003, on cable systems in Miami, Dallas–Fort Worth, Chicago and Los Angeles.

=== YES in Connecticut ===
In 2009, the network launched a feed for Connecticut: YES-CT.

=== Direct-to-consumer streaming service ===
In March 2023, YES launched a direct-to-consumer streaming service that included access to a 24/7 feed of YES Network and all New York Yankees, Brooklyn Nets and New York Liberty games appearing on YES. The service is only available in areas where YES is also featured on local cable. The service costs $24.99 per month or $239.99 a year, but was initially offered for an introductory price of $19.99 a month or $199.99 a year.

In January 2024, YES Network established a streaming joint venture with the rival MSG Network known as Gotham Advanced Media and Entertainment (GAME); in August 2024, GAME announced a new streaming platform known as the Gotham Sports App, which subsumed the existing streaming platforms of both MSG and YES. Both the YES DTC service and MSG Network's MSG+ were carried via the platform as individual subscriptions, with bundle offers also made available.

On July 29, 2026, DAZN announced that it had acquired GAME, and that the Gotham Sports App would be discontinued in favor of both MSG+ and YES Network moving to DAZN.

== Controversies ==
=== Carriage disputes ===
At its launch, YES became embroiled in a carriage dispute with Cablevision (which attempted to purchase the Yankees in 1998 and carried the team's games on MSG Network at the time of the channel's launch), leaving the Yankees' game telecasts not available to the provider's game telecasts for an entire year; this led the New York state government to intervene and serve as negotiator for a temporary carriage agreement between YES and Cablevision. In 2003, the two sides eventually signed a long-term contract to carry the network on Cablevision's New York area systems. This situation was very similar to another lengthy dispute that Cablevision entered into with MSG Network, after that network assumed the regional cable television rights to the Yankees in 1989 from Cablevision-owned SportsChannel New York.

Dish Network is the only pay television provider available in the New York City area that does not carry YES Network. The satellite provider has indicated that it would not offer the network unless it negotiates a lower per-channel subscriber fee due to concerns that the rates the network offered could force the provider to increase the pricing of its programming packages. YES, however, has a most favored nation clause with all of its cable and satellite providers, in which all of the network's other carriage agreements would be voided if it lowered its subscriber rate for a single provider. Former YES minority owner Goldman Sachs also maintains an ownership stake in Dish Network parent Echostar.

Time Warner Cable relocated YES from channel 30 to channel 53 on its New York City area systems in March 2008, soon after the New York City Council approved a measure to provide the Yankees public funding to build a new stadium. Simultaneously, Time Warner Cable moved business news channel Bloomberg Television to YES' former channel 30 slot, all while renegotiating its ten-year contract with Mayor Michael Bloomberg (owner of Bloomberg Television parent Bloomberg L.P.) and the city of New York.

In 2016, Comcast (who are part owners of Sportsnet New York) dropped the YES Network. The blackout ended on March 31, 2017, just in time for the start of the 2017 New York Yankees season.

=== Coverage issues ===
In 2003, Don Zimmer (then employed with the Yankees as a bench coach) expressed criticism of team owner George Steinbrenner in interviews with certain local media outlets. After this came to light, it was later rumored that, in response, Steinbrenner ordered YES not to show Zimmer on-camera during its Yankee telecasts.

In April 2005, YES declined to broadcast pre-game Opening Day festivities celebrating the Boston Red Sox' 2004 World Series championship win prior to its telecast of a Red Sox home game against the Yankees at Fenway Park. YES was roundly criticized for this move, including its decision to use a fixed camera shot focused tightly on correspondent Kimberly Jones as she described the events surrounding her in general terms. Yankees players not only witnessed the ceremonies, but graciously applauded them from the top steps of their dugout. Perhaps due to this incident, YES broadcast the majority of the ceremonies honoring the Red Sox' celebration of the 100th Anniversary of Fenway Park in 2012.

During the 2005 season, New York City area newspapers reported that the post-game questions asked to Yankees manager Joe Torre by Kimberly Jones were being sent to her by top-level team executives (possibly on directives from George Steinbrenner), and that Torre did not feel comfortable answering them. Torre, who had been paid by YES to give exclusive interviews after each Yankees game, ended his agreement with the network. YES now sends its reporter to the regular pre-game and post-game media sessions with other broadcast outlets.

Preceded by MSG Network; 1989–2001	Over-the-air (cable); Home of the New York Yankees; 2002–present	Succeeded by incumbent
